= The Gale House =

The Gale House can refer to any of three houses built by Frank Lloyd Wright in Oak Park, Illinois:

- Mrs. Thomas H. Gale House
- Thomas H. Gale House
- Walter Gale House
