= Arthur Heurtley House =

Historic house in Oak Park, Illinois

- U.S. National Register of Historic Places
- U.S. National Historic Landmark
- U.S. Historic district – Contributing property
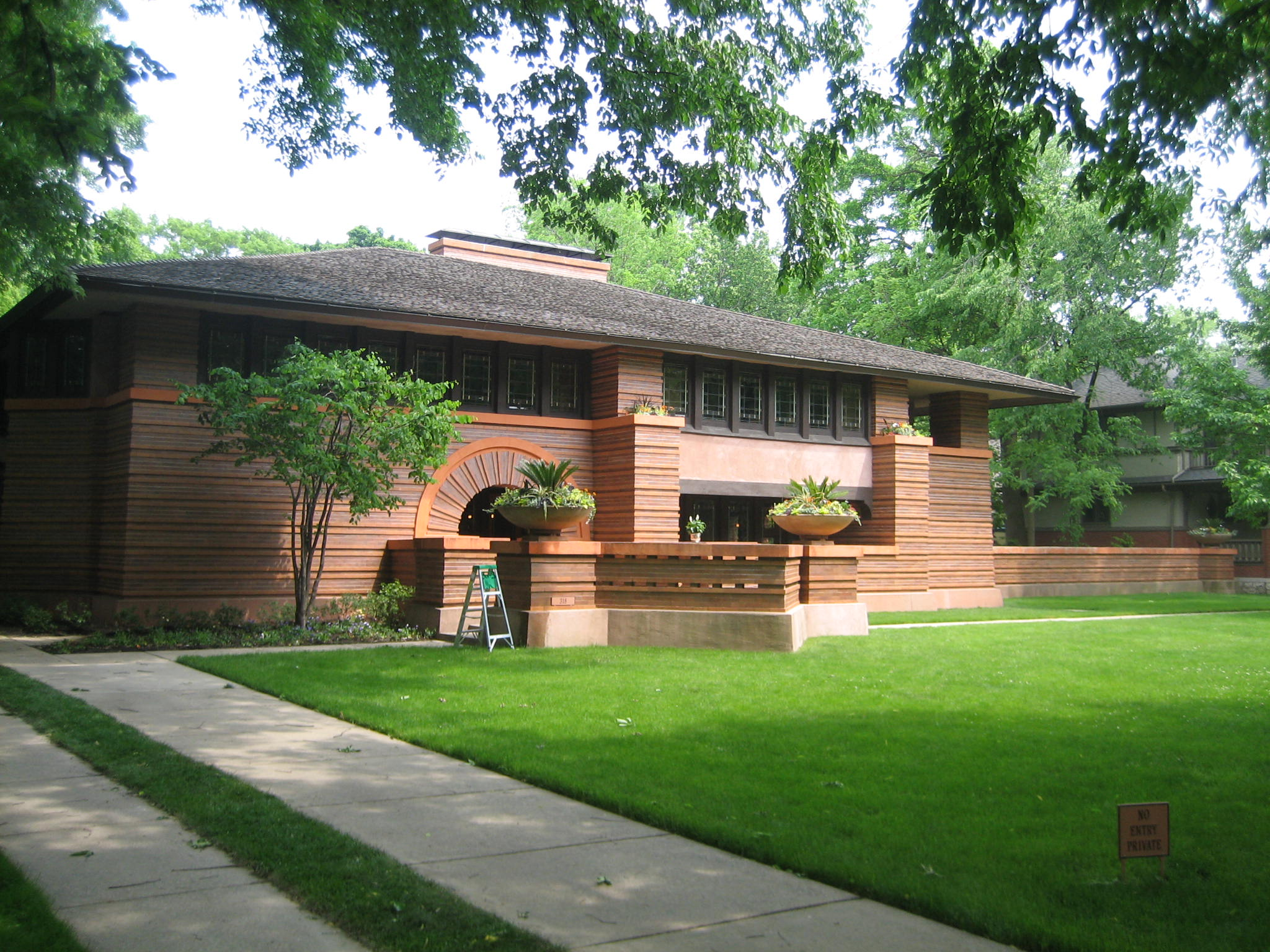

- Location within Chicago metropolitan area Location within Illinois Location within the United States
- Interactive map of Arthur Heurtley House
- Location: 318 Forest Avenue, Oak Park, Illinois, United States
- Coordinates: 41°53′33.8″N 87°47′59.4″W
- Area: 0.2 acres (0.081 ha)
- Built: 1902
- Architect: Frank Lloyd Wright
- Architectural style: Prairie style
- Part of: Frank Lloyd Wright-Prairie School of Architecture Historic District (ID73000699)
- NRHP reference No.: 00000258

Significant dates
- Added to NRHP: February 16, 2000
- Designated NHL: February 16, 2000

The Arthur Heurtley House is a Prairie-style residence at 318 Forest Avenue in Oak Park, a suburb of Chicago in Illinois, United States. Designed by Frank Lloyd Wright and constructed in 1902, the Heurtley House is one of the earliest examples of a Wright-designed house in full Prairie style. Its decorative features, such as its horizontal design details, low roof, and pinwheel motifs, were reused in Wright's later Prairie-style works. The house is designated as a National Historic Landmark and is part of the Frank Lloyd Wright–Prairie School of Architecture Historic District, a National Register of Historic Places district.

The house was constructed for the family of the banker Arthur Heurtley. In 1920, the house was purchased by Wright's sister Jane Porter and her husband Andrew, who lived there for 26 years. The house was split into two residences in the mid-20th century. It was resold in 1946 before the biology professor Jack Prost acquired it in the early 1970s. The Baehrend family bought the house in 1997 and restored it as a single residence, selling the house to the Hunt family in 2007. The house remains a private residence in the 21st century.

The Heurtley House occupies the northern section of its land lot, recessed from the street. It has a Roman brick facade that slopes slightly inward. Wright sought to emphasize the house's horizontal design details, in part by laying horizontal courses of protruding and recessed bricks in different tones. The first floor has a round-arched entrance, and the second floor has horizontal bands of windows below a low-pitched roof with protruding eaves. Terraces and balconies are located throughout the house. Inside, the house has private spaces such as a playroom, laundry, and storage space on the ground (first) floor, and communal spaces such as living and dining rooms on the second floor. Bedrooms are spread across both floors.

== Site ==
The Heurtley House is located at 318 Forest Avenue (sometimes described as 312 Forest Avenue) in the town of Oak Park, a suburb of Chicago in Illinois, United States. The house occupies a parcel measuring 132 by 270 feet (40 by 82 m) across and was created from the combination of three smaller land lots. There is a large front lawn in front of the house. The lawn creates a 71-foot-deep (22 m) setback from Forest Avenue's eastern sidewalk, slightly farther than other houses on the same block.

The house is located near the northern portion of its parcel. The house's architect, Frank Lloyd Wright, had deliberately pushed the house northward to provide open space to the south, as well as to save several existing trees on the site. Running alongside the house is a driveway at the parcel's northern boundary, which connects with a Prairie style garage. The eastern section of the site has a backyard, which originally contained an old growth tree. Though the Chicago Daily Tribune described the backyard tree in 1920 as being a millennium old, the Oak Park Wednesday Journal wrote in 2014 that the oldest trees in the town were no more than 280 years old. The southern and eastern edges of the houses are surrounded by brick parapets, which are decorated with protruding and recessed bricks, similar to those found on the house's facade (see Arthur Heurtley House § Exterior). Other parapets extend throughout the site, and rectangular planting boxes are placed along the northern and southern perimeters.

On the same city block to the north is the Frank Lloyd Wright Home and Studio. Just east of the Wright Home and Studio is a house that belonged to Wright's mother. Several of Wright's other houses are located on Forest Avenue, such as the William H. Copeland House, between the Heurtley House and Wright Studio. The Walter Gale House, Francis J. Woolley House, and Robert P. Parker House are located on the block to the west. The Nathan G. Moore House and Edward R. Hills House are on the west side of Forest Avenue. The Frank W. Thomas House is one block to the south. Many of these houses, plus the Fricke House on Fair Oaks Avenue, have south-facing porches, patterned after similar verandas in the Victorian style. The Heurtley House's driveway directly faces the Moore House's porch, and the garden south of the Heurtley House faces the living space of the Gray House immediately across Forest Avenue.

== History ==
The Heurtley House was built for the family of the banker Arthur Heurtley. Born in 1860, Heurtley was the only child of the doctors Richard Walter Heurtley and Cornelia Brown. After Cornelia died in 1866, Richard and Arthur moved to the Chicago area, where Arthur joined the Northern Trust Company in 1889. Arthur had been promoted as the company's assistant secretary by 1891. He married Grace Elizabeth Crampton in 1890, and they had two children, Richard Walter and Katherine. They occupied three houses in twelve years, moving to Oak Park from the nearby town of River Forest in 1894.

=== Heurtley ownership ===
Heurtley was typical of Frank Lloyd Wright's early clients, who tended to be wealthy, and who were open-minded enough to accept Wright's then-unconventional designs despite the ridicule targeted at them. Heurtley was socially outgoing, and he likely came to know Wright through personal acquaintance. Both men were active in various local organizations, and they also liked music, and Wright's firm and the Northern Trust Company both had offices at the Rookery Building in Downtown Chicago in the late 1890s. Wright biographer Lisa Schrenk wrote that it was also possible that they met on the train or in Downtown Chicago.

In March 1902, Heurtley paid $9,250 (equivalent to $299,000 in 2024) for a site on Forest Avenue in Oak Park. He then commissioned two houses from Wright: a primary house on the Forest Avenue site, and a cottage in Michigan. The contractor Pellinger Bros. began erecting the Oak Park house in June 1902, upon which it was scheduled to cost $8,000 (equivalent to $218,000 in 2024). The house's construction attracted large numbers of passersby on weekends; at one point, Heurtley wrote to 11-year-old Richard, saying his son would laugh at the crowds who looked at the house. Heurtley ultimately spent $11,000 (equivalent to $299,000 in 2024) on his Oak Park residence. Wright's son John subsequently recalled that no bank was willing to lend money to fund his father's early designs.

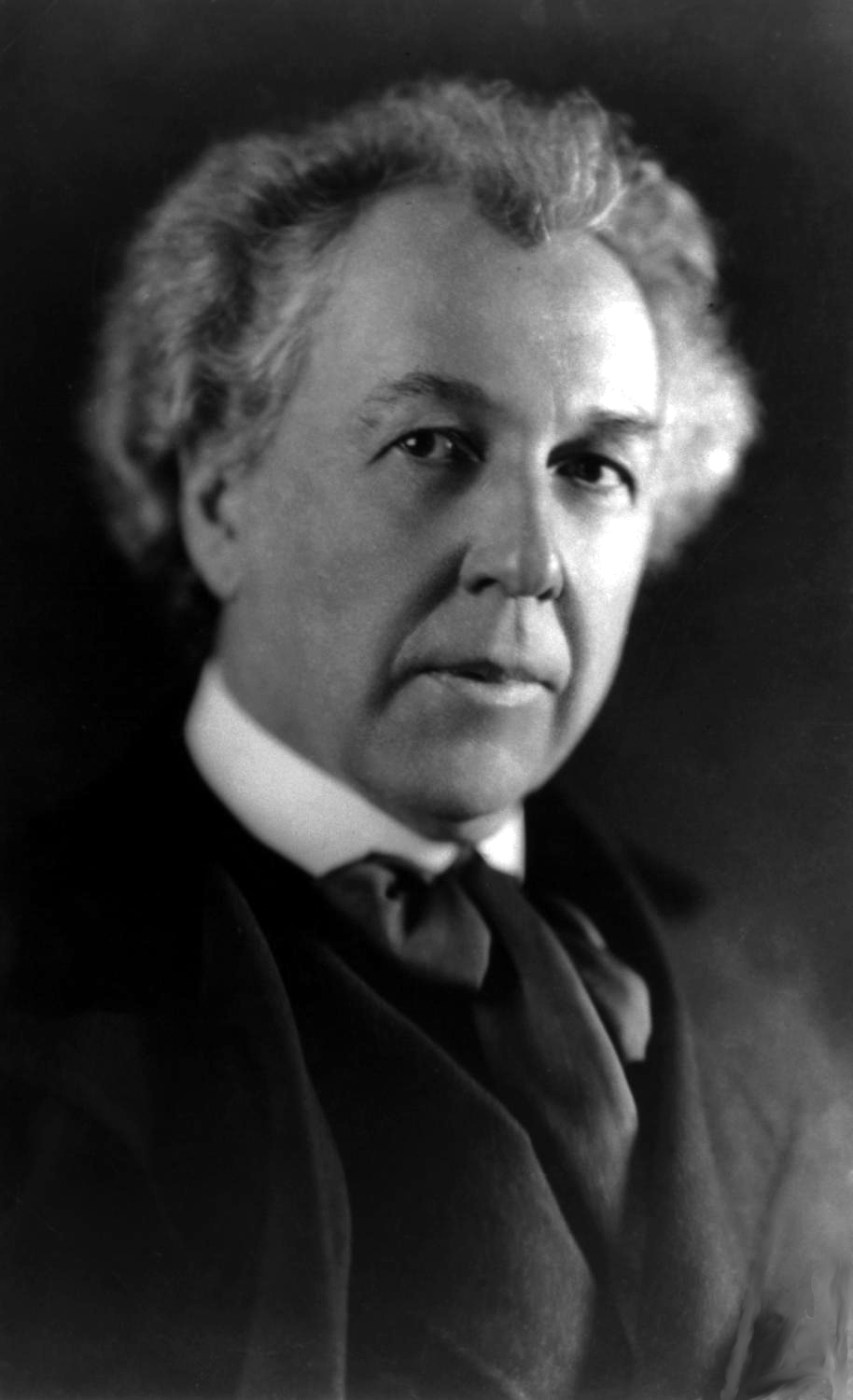
In 1902, Heurtley hired Frank Lloyd Wright (pictured in later years) to design two houses: the Heurtley House in Oak Park and a cottage in Michigan.

The Heurtleys were living in the house by late 1902. Shortly afterward, the businessman Darwin D. Martin visited the Heurtley House while deciding whether to hire Wright to design his own mansion in Buffalo, New York. The local engineer Edwin Cheney and his wife Mamah Borthwick Cheney, upon seeing the Heurtleys' residence, also hired Wright to design their own house in Oak Park. As built, the Heurtley House and neighboring buildings received heat from the Yaryan system, a series of underground pipes that circulated hot water. The Heurtleys hosted numerous parties at the house—most of them hosted by Arthur, since cooking and needlework were the only two things Grace is known to have liked. Heurtley was still excited about the house in 1908, when he called Wright "one of the most remarkable men he had ever met" in a letter to a friend. By 1912, Wright's affair with Mamah Cheney had alienated Heurtley and many other clients.

During the Heurtley family's ownership, the Heurtley House underwent several major changes. On the second story, they added screens to the loggia separating the living room and the porch. A breakfast room was added on the second floor, and a "wood room" on the first floor was converted into a pantry or food storage area; Wright's office likely designed both these modifications, although it is unknown when they occurred. Another deviation from Wright's plan was the addition of a dining table and chairs from the Heurtleys' previous house, which the couple had acquired when they became married.

=== Mid-20th century ===
In 1920, Heurtley retired from his position as the Northern Trust Company's secretary. At the time, Wright's sister Jane Porter and her husband Andrew had canceled plans to expand their own nearby house, after a neighbor built a house that obstructed views from their proposed annex. The Porters became the second owners of the Heurtley House, paying $50,000 (equivalent to $591,000 in 2024) for it. Heurtley moved to Iowa where he lived until his death in 1934. The Porters lived there with their son Franklin Porter, who later became an airline executive. The family stayed in the Heurtley House until 1946. After the Porters moved out, two subsequent owners modified the Heurtley House over the next half-century.

In the mid-20th century, the house was divided into a two-family home. The subdivision is cited as having occurred during the Porters' occupancy, and a 1942 legal notice in the Oak Park Oak Leaves indicated that the Porters were requesting zoning permission to convert the building to a two-family home. The modifications did not take place until 1947. Each level became a separate apartment; the modifications required adding four bedrooms and two kitchens. Windows were built around the porch on the first floor's western elevation, creating another indoor space. After the porch was enclosed, an eave was built to shield that room from the sun. The kitchens and bathrooms were modernized; a black iron gate was added to the entryway; the living room inglenook and dining room breakfront were removed; and a second chimney and furnace were added. A section of the second-floor porch was enclosed, becoming another bathroom.

By 1947, the family of Otto D. Plank was listed as living at the Heurtley House. The Yaryan heating system was deactivated in 1955, and part of the ground-floor space was converted into a furnace room at that time.

=== Prost ownership ===
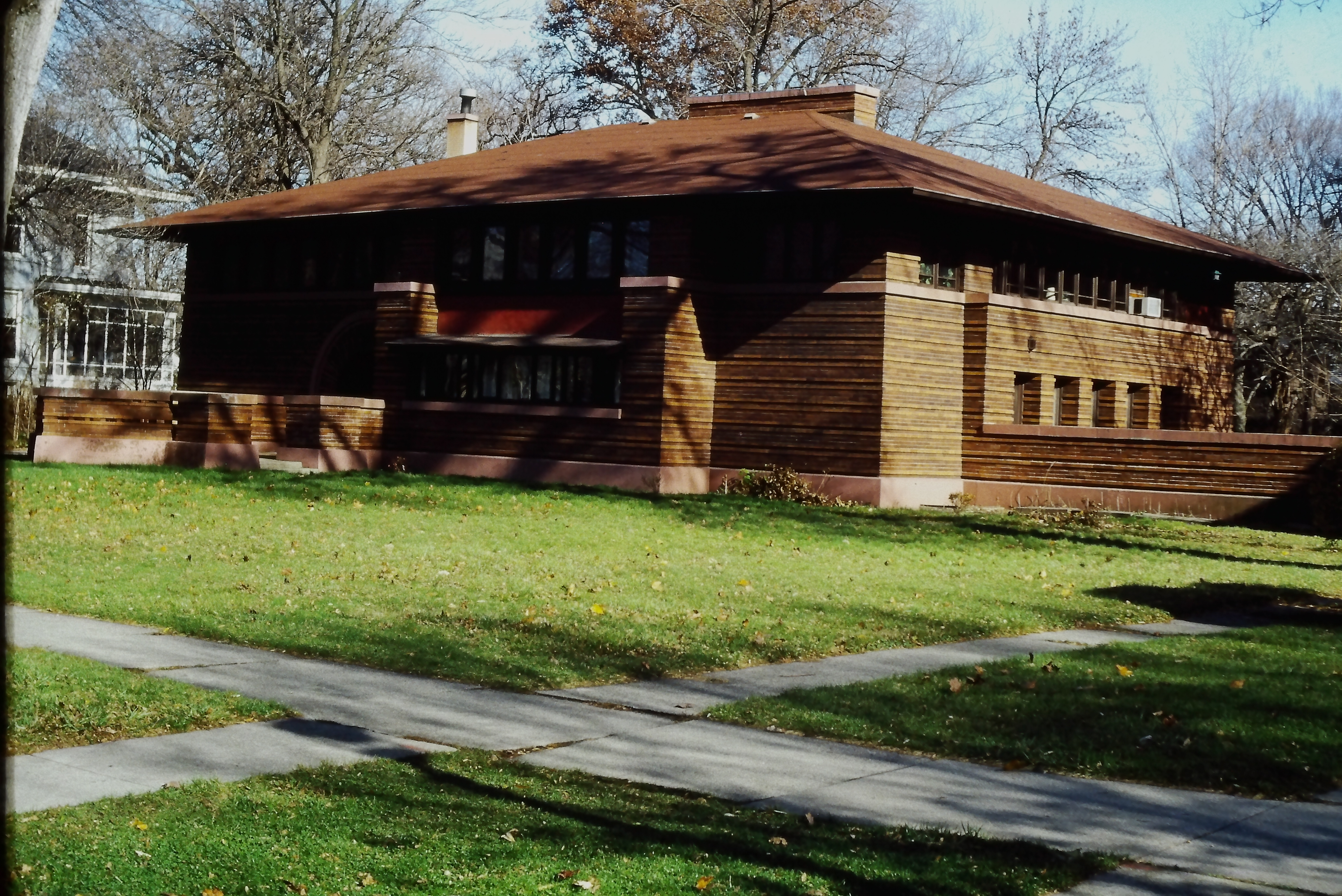
The house as seen from the southwest

The fourth owner was the biology professor Jack Prost, who acquired the house in 1972 or 1973. Prost had wanted to buy a Wright-designed house in Oak Park after moving there in 1970, and his existing house was deteriorated, prompting him to seek a structure with low maintenance requirements. Prost finally bought the Heurtley House for about $90,000 (equivalent to $510,000 in 2024) after placing a written offer in the mailbox. After buying the house, Prost furnished the interiors with his own furniture, saying he could not "live with Wright totally", and he added a new roof and repaired the walls and brickwork. Prost also acquired replicas of a table and four chairs designed by Wright (which may have been copies of furniture at Chicago's Robie House), but Prost sold the replica furnishings after finding them incompatible with the Heurtley House's design. At first, Prost could afford to maintain the house and pay the property taxes, but his taxes gradually increased all while he supported his children financially, thus straining his finances.

During the late 20th century, the house attracted visitors from around the world. It was included on walking tours, and it hosted events such as parties for the Frank Lloyd Wright Home and Studio Foundation. Prost retrospectively expressed appreciation for various aspects of the design, including its floor plan and decorations. Conversely, Prost told the Chicago Tribune that he disliked how reporters and architects felt entitled to enter the house. By 1994, Prost had placed the home for sale, as he could no longer afford the tax payments of $18,000 a year (equivalent to $39,000 in 2025). The taxes, over a third of his annual salary, had increased ninefold over the two preceding decades, forcing him to withdraw from his retirement savings. The house was also in poor condition. Prost had hired an appraiser, who had concluded that the house would need $401,700 (equivalent to $873,000 in 2025) just to bring it into a state of good repair.

=== Baehrend and Hunt ownership ===
The Heurtley House was sold in 1997 for under $500,000 (equivalent to $905,000 in 2024). Ed Baehrend, who bought the house with his wife Diane, had previously read about the house in a book by the author Brendan Gill, and had remembered Gill's book when he saw a sales listing for the building. Over the next five years, the Baehrends spent $2.5 million (equivalent to $4,475,000 in 2024) on a complete restoration, which included the period furnishings. John Thorpe, the project's restoration architect, oversaw the project. Workers removed bedrooms and kitchens that had been added over the years, along with several walls that had divided the two floors, and they renovated the kitchen and replaced the gutters and roof. Workers also replaced the plumbing, electric, and heating, ventilation, and air conditioning systems. The Baehrends also hired the glass artisan Peter Morava to replicate the windows. In addition to eliminating the extra apartment, the Baehrends demolished a garage that post-dated Wright's original design. During the Baehrends' renovation, fans of Wright's work continued to visit the house on walking tours; since the building was still a private residence, the interiors were closed to the public.

The Baehrend family moved into the house in 1998; Ed retrospectively said he enjoyed returning home and that he constantly found new design features to appreciate. The house was sometimes used for events, such as Wright Plus tours of Wright-designed houses and fundraising events. The house was designated a National Historic Landmark in 2000. The house was placed for sale in 2005 with an asking price of $5.75 million (equivalent to $8,849,000 in 2024). The price, which would have been a record for any house in Oak Park, was comparable to those of other Wright houses nationwide, which by then were being sold for millions of dollars. Patty Hunt, the house's eventual buyer, initially did not seek a Wright-designed house, as she knew that his designs often required extensive renovation. When Patty and her husband Ken looked at the sales listing on a whim, they found that the Baehrends had already recently renovated the building, and they were also attracted by the light-colored woodwork.

The Hunts bought the Heurtley House in early 2007 for about $2.5 million (equivalent to $3,633,000 in 2024). The purchase price, less than half the original listing price, was still a record for a Wright-designed house in the Chicago metropolitan area. The Hunts' niece said in 2013 that the couple had invited the public inside only once, and Madonna once requested a tour of the house but was denied. The Hunts did occasionally offer their house for charity events, such as in 2010, when Chicago's Adler Planetarium auctioned off the opportunity for a private dinner at the house. Strangers still came unprompted. Fans of Wright's work took pictures, and they rang the doorbell under the mistaken impression that the house was a museum; in one case, two prospective visitors tried to follow a family member through the side door. By the mid-2010s, the house was sometimes being included on Wright Plus tours.

== Architecture ==
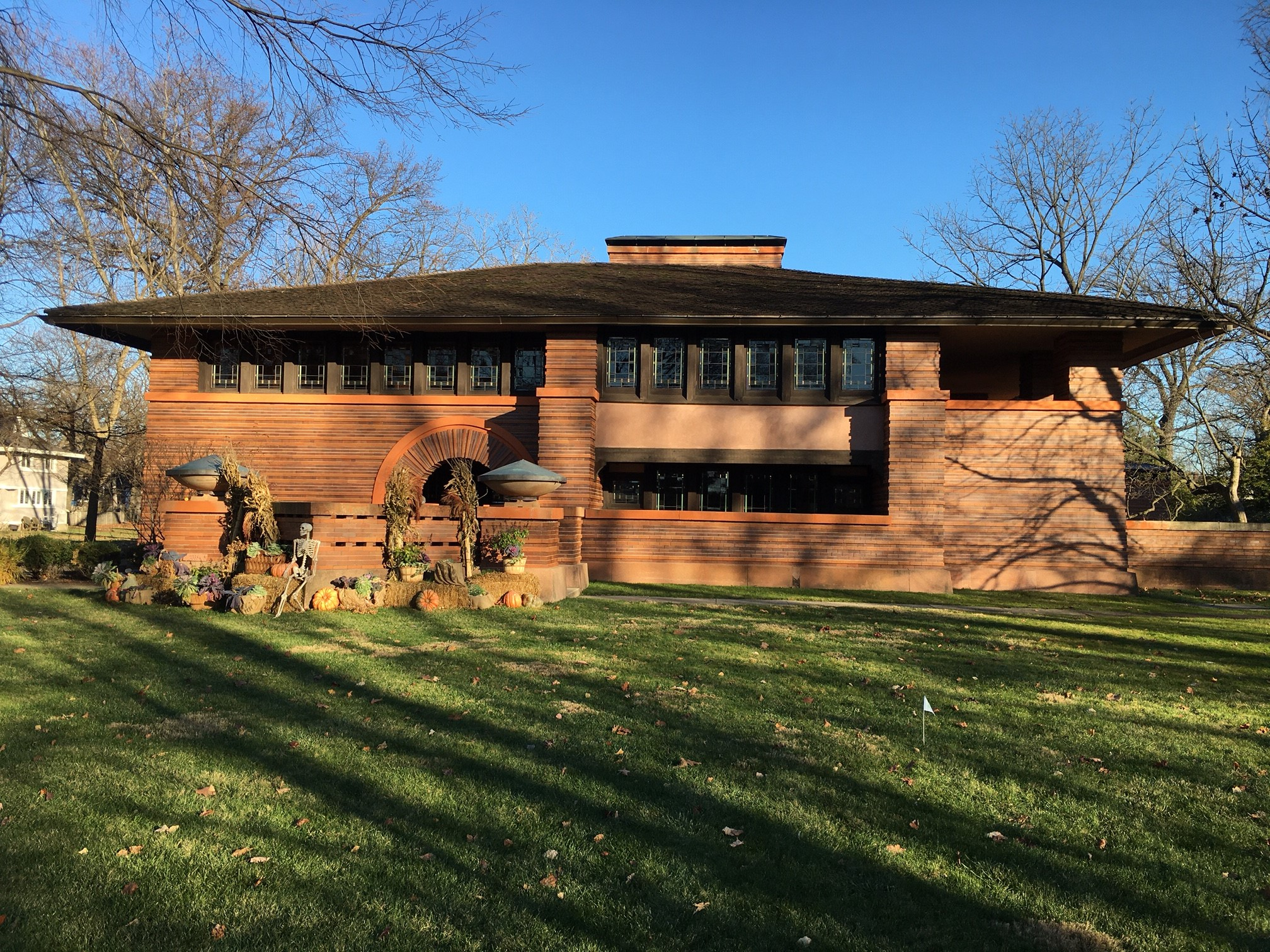
The facade of the house as seen from directly across the street

The Heurtley House is one of Wright's earliest houses designed exclusively in the Prairie style, alongside the nearby Frank W. Thomas House. (Note: Sources have also cited the Thomas House across the street to be the first fully mature Wright-designed Prairie style house. The writer Lisa Schrenk wrote that both the Heurtley and Willits houses were among Wright's earliest completely Prairie style houses.) Wright and members of his studio designed the Heurtley House nearly simultaneously with other houses that also contained Prairie-style features, such as the Thomas, Ward W. Willits, and Susan Lawrence Dana houses. Despite the size differences between the various Prairie houses, they share many layout and design features. In particular, the Heurtley and Thomas houses both include a raised main floor, horizontal bands of windows below deep eaves, and a nature-inspired color palette. The Heurtley House's entrance arch design is shared with several of Wright's other Prairie-style works, including the Thomas and Dana houses.

In contrast to Wright's earlier independent work, the Heurtley House and other early fully-Prairie style buildings had "unit systems" of designs and a more sophisticated room layout. Wright also used clean lines in the design, which may have been influenced by Wright's affinity for Japanese architecture. To create a sense of shelter, Wright included features such as eaves and a recessed entrance. Jack Prost, one of the former owners, said that "the conceptual play between squares and rectangles, shallowness and depth, is achieved by hiding surfaces and angles in one scene and then revealing them as one moved, thus changing one's interpretation of the shape".

=== Exterior ===
The Heurtley House spans two stories. It has a mostly rectangular footprint measuring 49 by 67 feet (15 by 20 m) across; the configuration has sometimes been described as resembling a square. Portions of the end walls protrude slightly, creating a slightly pinwheel-shaped layout. Wright's later works also used protruding wings, albeit substantially longer. Prows protrude from the northern and eastern elevations of the house, an allusion to Heurtley's appreciation of sailing. The northern elevation is set back just enough to accommodate the driveway between the northern prow and the property line.

In designing the building, Wright wanted to emphasize the horizontal decorative details, an effect he also sought in other buildings such as the Robie House. As such, he built the house low to the ground, with horizontally-oriented bricks and windows beneath a low roof. The facade is made of Roman bricks, which are thinner than bricks in typical American buildings, measuring about 8 1/4 by 2 1/4 inches (210 by 57 mm) across. Wright laid horizontal courses of protruding light-colored brick, each flanking a course of recessed dark-colored brick. Between each cluster of protruding and recessed bricks are three courses of bricks, each stepped back slightly from the course below. Eight sets of protruding and recessed bricks extend between ground level and the windowsill below the second floor. The Heurtley House is the only building where Wright used alternating courses of protruding and recessed light and dark bricks. The brick walls slope inward at an 8-degree angle to create what Wright said was a connection to the earth.

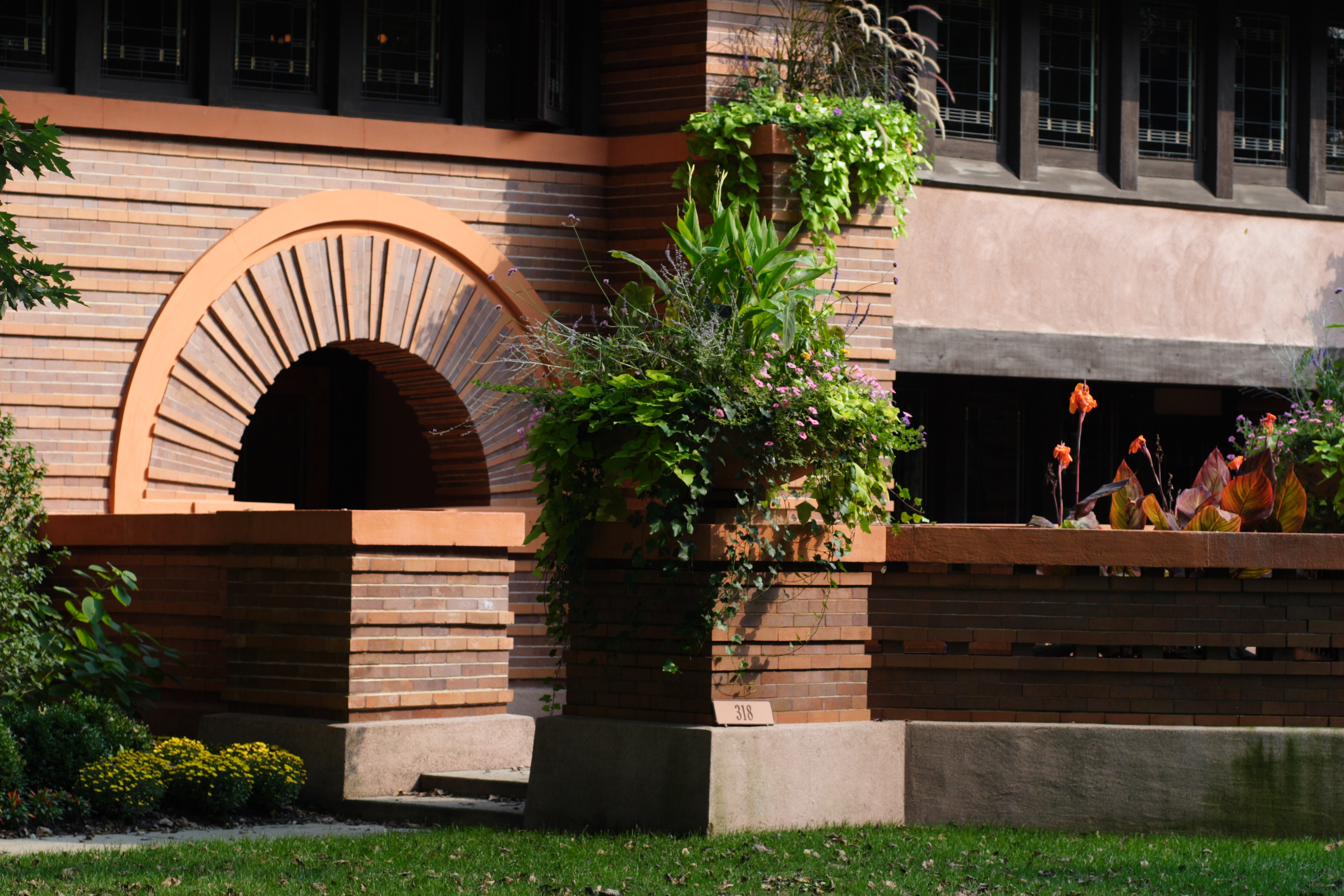
The main entrance to the house, placed behind a parapet with a prow

The western elevation is divided into three asymmetrical bays. To protect visitors from strong winds, Wright built a 5-foot-tall (1.5 m) parapet wall in front of the western elevation, decorated with similar brickwork to the main facade. The parapet contains a prow, behind which is the main entrance, accessed from the street via a circuitous path. The entrance consists of a Romanesque-style round arch with a leaded glass doorway leading to the house's first-floor reception hall. The southernmost bay of the western elevation contains an exterior porch, and the southern elevation includes a terrace. Both spaces are accessed from the first-floor playroom. In front of the porch and terrace are brick parapets, both of which also have prows. The rest of the first story has few windows.

The second story contains a horizontal band of 68 art glass windows, positioned under the eaves. The art glass windows, a feature shared with Wright's other Prairie-style houses, were intended to give the second-story interiors a spacious feel. The eaves themselves protrude 5 feet (1.5 m) from the facade and are part of a low-pitched roof made of cedar. Wright had intended for the eaves to provide a sense of shelter and privacy to the interior spaces. As built, the living room's western wall was pushed out 2.5 feet (0.76 m) from the rest of the facade sheltering the first-floor playroom porch; the eave on that elevation is shallower than on the other elevations. A chimney protrudes atop the roof, corresponding to the western elevation's central bay.

=== Interior ===
The Heurtley House spans about 6,000 square feet (560 m^{2}). The house's private spaces are on the ground (first) floor, and its communal rooms are on the second; as such, the first floor functions as a raised basement. This was in contrast with other American houses of the time but was in keeping with Wright's Nathan G. Moore House across the street, which also had a raised basement. The arrangement was purely utilitarian, as the Heurtley House, being surrounded by other houses, had no particularly noteworthy landscape views. The house has neither a basement nor an attic, both of which were common to other houses of the time. Wright disliked attics and basements, so he omitted them from his Prairie-style designs. The interior arrangement forces occupants to make several turns to access the rooms inside. The writer Lisa Schrenk wrote that the floor plan created "a sense of pilgrimage for visitors" by continuing the indirectness of the entrance path outside.

The house's walls are made of plaster. Throughout the Heurtley House, Wright used lightly stained birch, in contrast to the dark wood he used in his other buildings. Birch is used for moldings (including bands near the top of the walls) and in cabinets and floors. The first floor uses darker natural tones such as ochre, tan, and brown. Lighter colors such as pale greens, golds, and pinks were used on the second floor; the National Park Service wrote that contrasts between these colors were intended to evoke a treehouse. Further contrast is provided by the ceiling heights, which are lower on the first story than the second story. The windows and doors are extensively decorated with green-and-gold art glass panes, arranged to create geometric motifs. Wright also designed furniture for the house; one of the original chairs has been at the Huntington Library in California since 2009.

==== First story ====
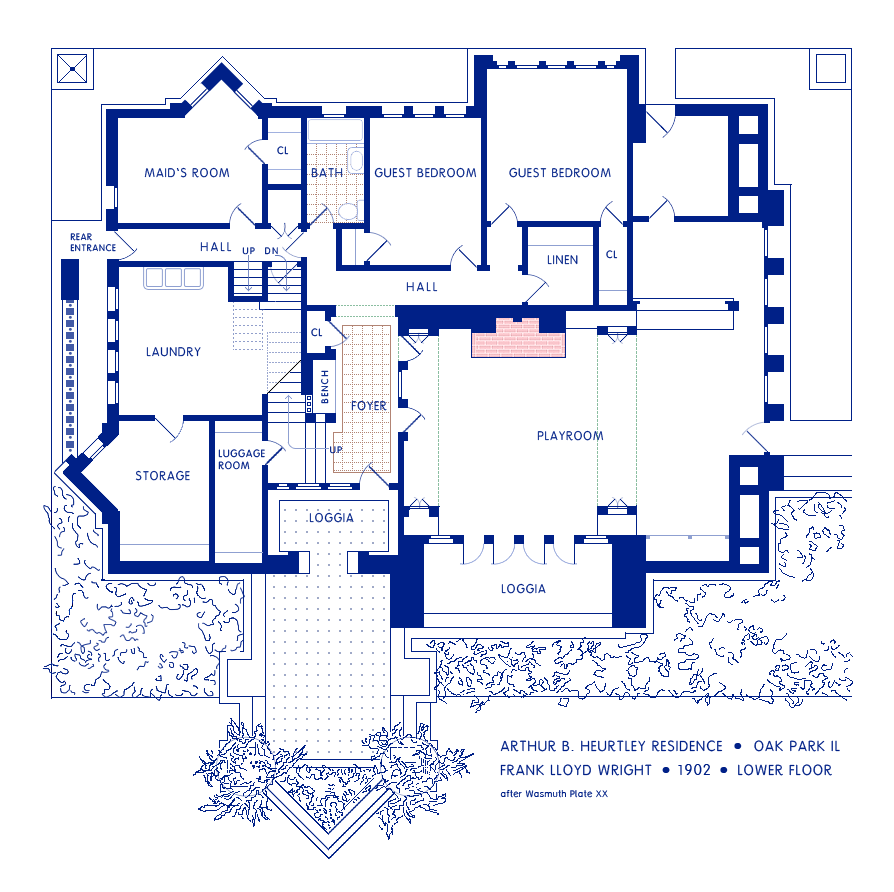
Ground floor plan

The foyer or reception hall has a floor surface with pinwheel motifs, consisting of four brick floor pavers surrounding white tiles. The reception hall has woodwork, along with benches on its left (north) wall; the tops of the walls have wooden bands. A doorway proceeds straight toward a central hall in the east. The south wall of the central hall leads to a large playroom, originally a music and reception room. The playroom's eastern wall has an off-center fireplace; the hearth has the same pinwheel design as the reception hall's floor, and the fireplace mantel is of two-toned brick. There are woodwork on either side of the fireplace, along with a built-in seat. The playroom's southern wall has a loggia leading out onto the terrace, and the western wall has art glass doors leading to the porch. A wood storage room is placed east of the southern section of the playroom; this room is used as a second kitchen with birch furniture, soapstone counters, a sink, and a stove.

The east end of the central hall connects to a north–south corridor, which divides the playroom to the west from other first-floor rooms to the east. The southern end of this corridor has a linen closet. East of the corridor (from south to north) are two guest bedrooms, a bathroom, and a servant room. The guest bedrooms are lit by art-glass casement windows. As built in 1902, the bathroom was decorated with white hexagonal floor tiles, a birch medicine cabinet, and a sink with elaborate feet; it was renovated in the 1950s before the original tiles were readded in the 1990s. The corridor connects with a rear entrance on the house's northern elevation.

Just north of the central hall and west of the servant room are two flights of stairs. One flight ascends to the second story, and another flight descends four steps to a recessed portion of the first story. The recessed space has concrete floors and plaster walls; it contains laundry and boiler rooms, along with an entrance to a crawl space under the southern half of the house. At the northwest end of the recessed space are a regular storage room and a trunk storage room.

==== Second story ====
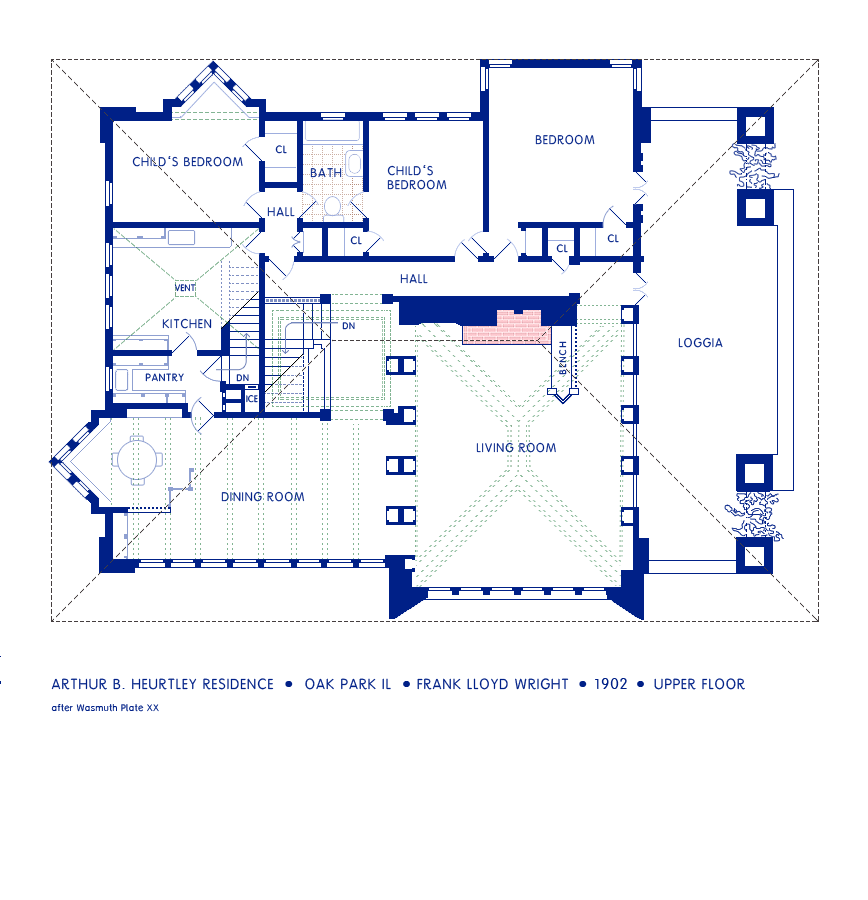
Upper floor plan

The flight of stairs to the second story is placed behind wooden screens with spindles turned 45 degrees, in imitation of the floor tiles' pinwheel motif. The turned spindles allow observers to see through the screens into the second-story spaces. The stairs open out into a central living room taking up much of the house's southern and western frontage. The living room has a sloped ceiling that follows the shape of the hip roof directly above; the ceiling has a geometric art-glass skylight. The eastern wall has a fireplace with a pinwheel motif on its hearth and a two-toned brick mantel, similar to the playroom fireplace below. A partial inglenook and a prow-shaped cabinet are next to the fireplace. The south wall has a loggia onto a porch, which measures 15 by 52 feet (4.6 by 15.8 m) across. The loggia was infilled with windows in the 1920s, and a bathroom was added at the porch's western end in the 1940s, but this has since been removed.

The dining room is at the second story's northwestern corner, separated from the living room by a colonnade. The colonnade allows sightlines of about 80 feet (24 m) between the house's north and south walls; the Chicago Daily Tribune wrote that the colonnade was intended to make the living and dining rooms flow into one another, rather than serve as a true wall. The dining room itself has coves with dimmable lights, in addition to sloped ceilings opening into skylights. Near the tops of the walls are wooden bands. A pantry and kitchen, respectively, are located east of the dining room.

At the eastern end of the house, the second floor contains three bedrooms. The bedrooms, like those on the ground floor, are lit by art-glass casement windows. Originally, the northern and central bedrooms were separated by a bathroom. The central bedroom has since been converted into an expanded dressing room and bathroom, with white hexagonal floor tiles, a birch medicine cabinet, and sinks with marble and chrome countertops. The southernmost bedroom is a master bedroom that connects with the porch.

== Impact and legacy ==
=== Reception ===
When the house was built, the Chicago Daily Tribune wrote that the house "appears rectangular and fortress-like" and called the interior "radically new, natural, and functional" in its arrangement and decoration. The Tribune wrote that, overall, the design features combined to make "a truly noteworthy home". The historian Henry-Russell Hitchcock wrote in 1942 that, because of the Heurtley House's second-story porch and the prow-shaped bays, "there is no feeling of restriction" compared with Wright's other early houses. Casabella Continuita magazine said in 1963 that Wright's previous work on his own studio and the Nathan Moore, Laura Gale, Thomas Gale, and Walter Gale houses were too reminiscent of older styles, "which makes the extraordinary leap forward of the Winslow, Thomas, [and] Heurtley [houses] more noticeable". In 1976, the writer Paul Sprague said that, because of how many buildings Wright designed in Oak Park and neighboring River Forest, the Heurtleys became a widely-known name among fans of Wright's work.

During the late 20th century, a New York Times writer called the Heurtley House among the best examples of the Prairie style in Oak Park, and Paul Goldberger of the same paper wrote that the house was one of Oak Park's "masterpieces". Wright biographer Brendan Gill, in 1987, called the house "especially handsome" , saying the porches and terraces helped alleviate what would otherwise have been an "excessively dense" design. A writer for the Chicago Tribune likened the house to a Japanese temple in 1991, and another Wright biographer, Meryle Secrest, wrote the next year that she considered the Heurtley House small yet enchanting. Another New York Times writer in 2015 said the front lawn gave the house "a sense of a balance with the environment", and the historian David Bagnall said in 2017 that the "solid and monolithic" design was distinctive. Several commentators regarded the Heurtley House among Wright's best Prairie-style houses. Conversely, in 1998, the San Francisco Examiner quoted a local writer who described the design as "dim and unfriendly".

=== Design influence ===
The design features that Wright used in the Heurtley House were reused in his other Prairie-style designs. Later Prairie-style houses were also designed with communal rooms on their upper stories; these rooms often had soaring ceilings that followed the roofline. The scholar Grant Hildebrand wrote that the Heurtley House's design had succeeded because it had introduced 13 "prospect-refuge elements"—design details that, according to Hildebrand, attracted people to semi-enclosed, elevated spaces. Hildebrand wrote that Wright consistently used at least 10 of these elements in many of his later designs. In other Prairie-style houses, Wright included deep eaves to provide privacy to occupants. When Wright began designing Usonian houses in the 1930s, he prioritized natural light exposure rather than privacy, so he began using trellises instead of eaves.

Wright's later Prairie-style houses tended to include horizontally-oriented design details, including horizontal bands of windows beneath low, overhanging roofs. These houses also generally contained such features as balconies, loggias, and central fireplaces and chimneys. Wright replicated the design of the house's fireplace in his own residence and others that he designed. Other Prairie-style designs, such as the Darwin D. Martin House, were built with circuitous entrance paths similar to those in the Heurtley House. Wright continued to experiment with the house's pinwheel-shaped motif in the floor layouts of many later houses.

=== Landmark designations and media ===
The Heurtley House is part of the Frank Lloyd Wright–Prairie School of Architecture Historic District. The district, listed on the National Register of Historic Places (NRHP), was established in 1973. The building was re-added to the NRHP in its own right on February 16, 2000, when it was declared a National Historic Landmark (NHL); at the time, only about 3% of NRHP listings were NHLs. The United States Department of the Interior granted the NHL designation because it deemed the Heurtley House important in the history of modern architecture, citing the building's status as one of Wright's first true Prairie-style designs.

Early on in Wright's career, the Heurtley House was detailed in Ernst Wasmuth's 1910 Wasmuth Portfolio. The late 1990s and early 2000s renovation was the subject of a 2003 documentary, Restoration of Frank Lloyd Wright's Heurtley House. The house was used as a filming location for the comedy film Ocean's Twelve in 2004, after its producers saw a Wright Plus tour listing for the house and decided to rent it out. It was also depicted in "Replicants", the fifth episode in season four of the TV series The Bear, in 2025. Patterns from the Heurtley House were also replicated in a carpet design made by F. Schumacher & Company of New York.

== See also ==
- List of Frank Lloyd Wright works
- List of National Historic Landmarks in Illinois
- National Register of Historic Places listings in Cook County, Illinois
