= Francis J. Woolley House =

Historic house in Oak Park, Illinois

- U.S. Historic district – Contributing property
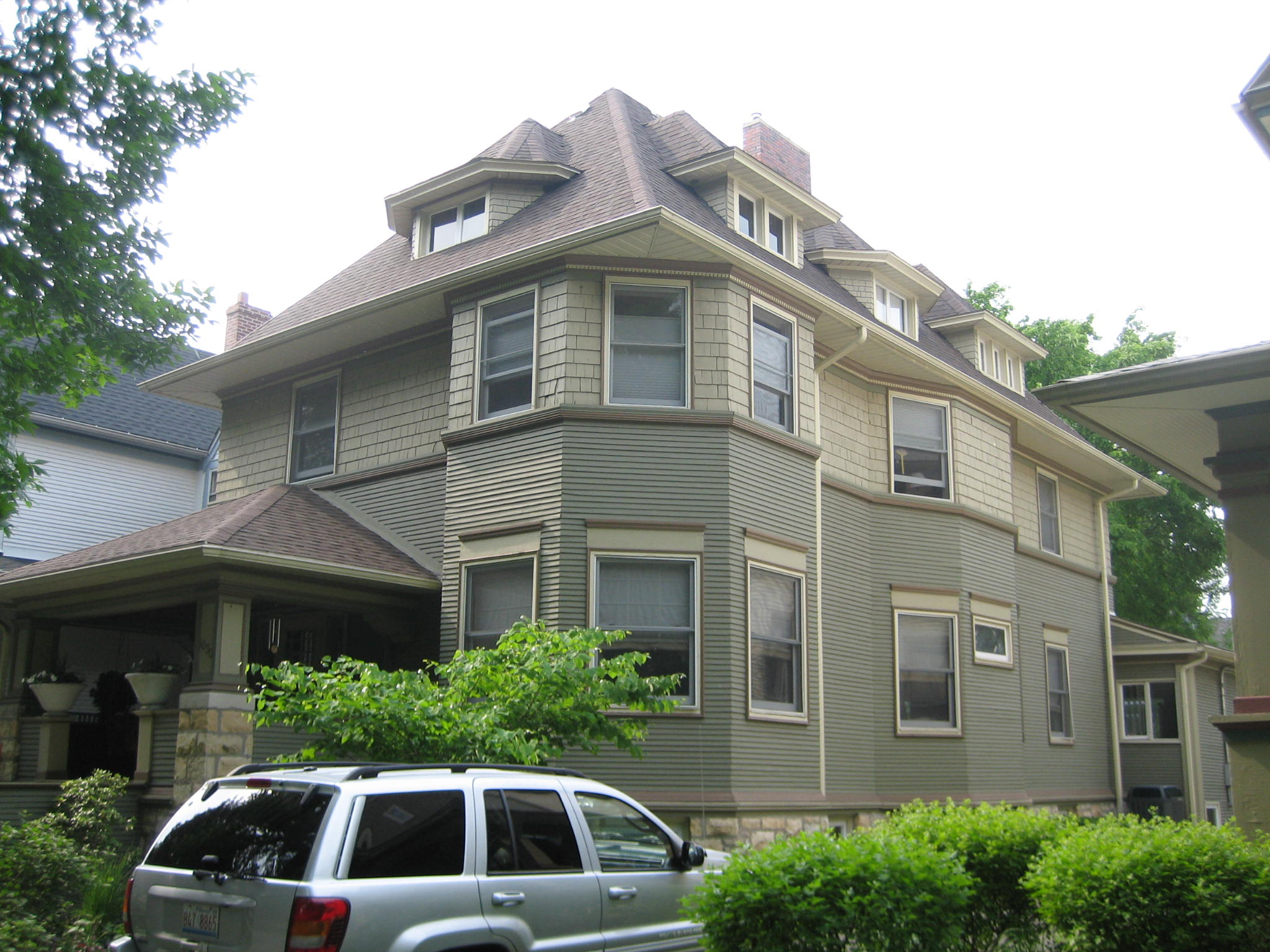

- Location within Illinois Location within the United States
- Interactive map showing the location of Francis J. Woolley House
- Location: Oak Park, Cook County, Illinois
- Coordinates: 41°53′35″N 87°48′3″W
- Built: 1893
- Architect: Frank Lloyd Wright
- Architectural style: Queen Anne, Arts and Crafts
- Part of: Frank Lloyd Wright-Prairie School of Architecture Historic District (ID73000699)
- Added to NRHP: December 4, 1973

The Francis J. Woolley House is a home at 1030 Superior Street in Oak Park, a suburb of Chicago, Illinois, United States. The house was designed by American architect Frank Lloyd Wright in 1893. The Queen Anne style home is reflective of Wright's early designs for lower-cost, more affordable housing. The Woolley House is similar to the trio of homes in Oak Park that are widely known as the "bootleg houses." The design is heavily influenced by Wright's first teacher, Joseph Silsbee, and the Arts and Crafts movement. The house is listed as a contributing property to a local and federal historic district.

== History ==
The Francis J. Woolley House was named for the lawyer for whom architect Frank Lloyd Wright originally designed it, Francis J. Woolley. It is currently a private residence.

== Architecture ==
The building's design has been called a "Queen Anne splendor," a style represented by the Woolley House's massive bay windows and projecting roof masses. Like other early Wright works, the design is much more conventional than later high-style examples of Wright's Prairie School such as the Heurtley House. The New York Times quipped in a 1996 article that the "two-story frame house with a hip roof that could almost pass for the vernacular architecture of the period." The design of the house is reminiscent of Wright's first teacher Joseph Silsbee and typical of Wright's early, low-cost residential designs. Its high-pitched, hip roof, polygonal and rectangular dormers, polygonal bay windows and wall foundations of rough stones are all reflections of Silsbee's picturesque manner of design. On the home's southeast portion are its polygonal bay windows and due to a restoration the rough stone foundation walls are more enhanced than they once were. The original horizontal wooden clapboarding has been restored as well.

The house features an entry porch whose high-pitched hip roof echoes the main roof; its deep eaves repeats the pitch lines of the roof and gracefully frames the facade. The Woolley House sits back-to-back with the Robert P. Parker House, in turn nearby the Thomas Gale House, houses whose style the Woolley House closely reflects. The Woolley House is often considered part of the same series of homes that included the Parker and Gale Houses. Those homes, along with the Walter Gale House, and have become known as Frank Lloyd Wright's "bootleg houses," because he designed them in violation of his agreement with architect Louis Sullivan and Dankmar Adler. In this early Wright work the influence of Silsbee and the Arts and Crafts movement are heavily embedded in the design, which reflects Wright's passion for designing affordable housing. The home's soft earthen tones help to enhance the "comfortable house" feel of the Woolley House.

Over the years the home has undergone several remodelings and renovations. Most significantly in 1995 when many of the mechanicals were upgraded. Unfortunately, many of the architectural moldings, doors and features were also removed. The current owners have brought back the exterior to its original condition. The interior is undergoing a complete restoration based on the original blueprints.

== Significance ==
This example of Frank Lloyd Wright's early work in Oak Park is considered a contributing property to the Frank Lloyd Wright-Prairie School of Architecture Historic District, a local and federal historic district. The federal historic district was added to the U.S. National Register of Historic Places on December 4, 1973.

== See also ==
- List of Frank Lloyd Wright works
