= Oak Park Conservatory =

Conservatory and botanical garden in Illinois, US

- U.S. National Register of Historic Places
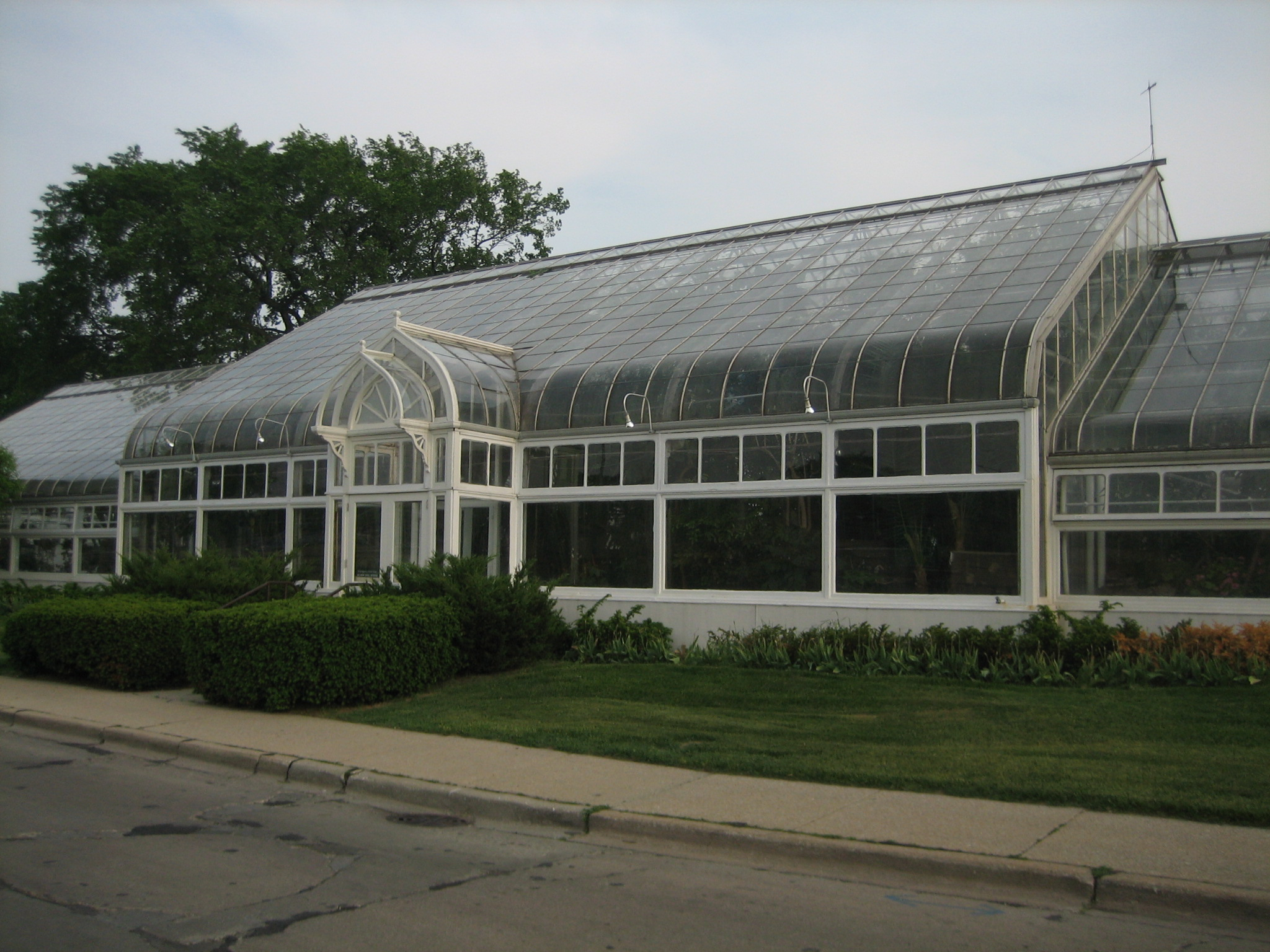

- Location within Illinois Location within the United States
- Location: 615 Garfield St., Oak Park, Illinois
- Coordinates: 41°52′17″N 87°47′22″W
- Area: 2 acres (0.81 ha)
- Built: 1929
- Built by: Foley Greenhouse Manufacturing Co.
- Architectural style: Edwardian Glasshouse
- Website: Official website
- NRHP reference No.: 04001298
- Added to NRHP: March 8, 2005

Oak Park Conservatory is a conservatory and botanical garden at 615 Garfield Street in Oak Park, a suburb of Chicago in Illinois, United States. It is open daily with restricted hours; admission is free, but a donation is suggested.

== History and development ==
The conservatory started in 1914, as a community effort to house exotic plants collected during residents' travels. Today's Edwardian-style glass structure was built in 1929, but fell into neglect until 1970, when a group of concerned citizens preserved it. Debate in the community had some suggesting the site would make "a perfect parking lot", but the volunteer actions of the Citizens Committee for the Conservatory saved it from that fate. In addition to its role supplying plants throughout the parks of Oak Park, the Conservatory's role was expanded to be a place to educate school children and gardeners. The structure was expanded in 2000. The conservatory now provides 8,000 square feet (700 m^{2}) of growing areas, making it the third largest conservatory in the Chicago area, and contains more than 3,000 plants, some of which date back to 1914. The Oak Park Conservatory was added to the U.S. National Register of Historic Places on March 8, 2005.

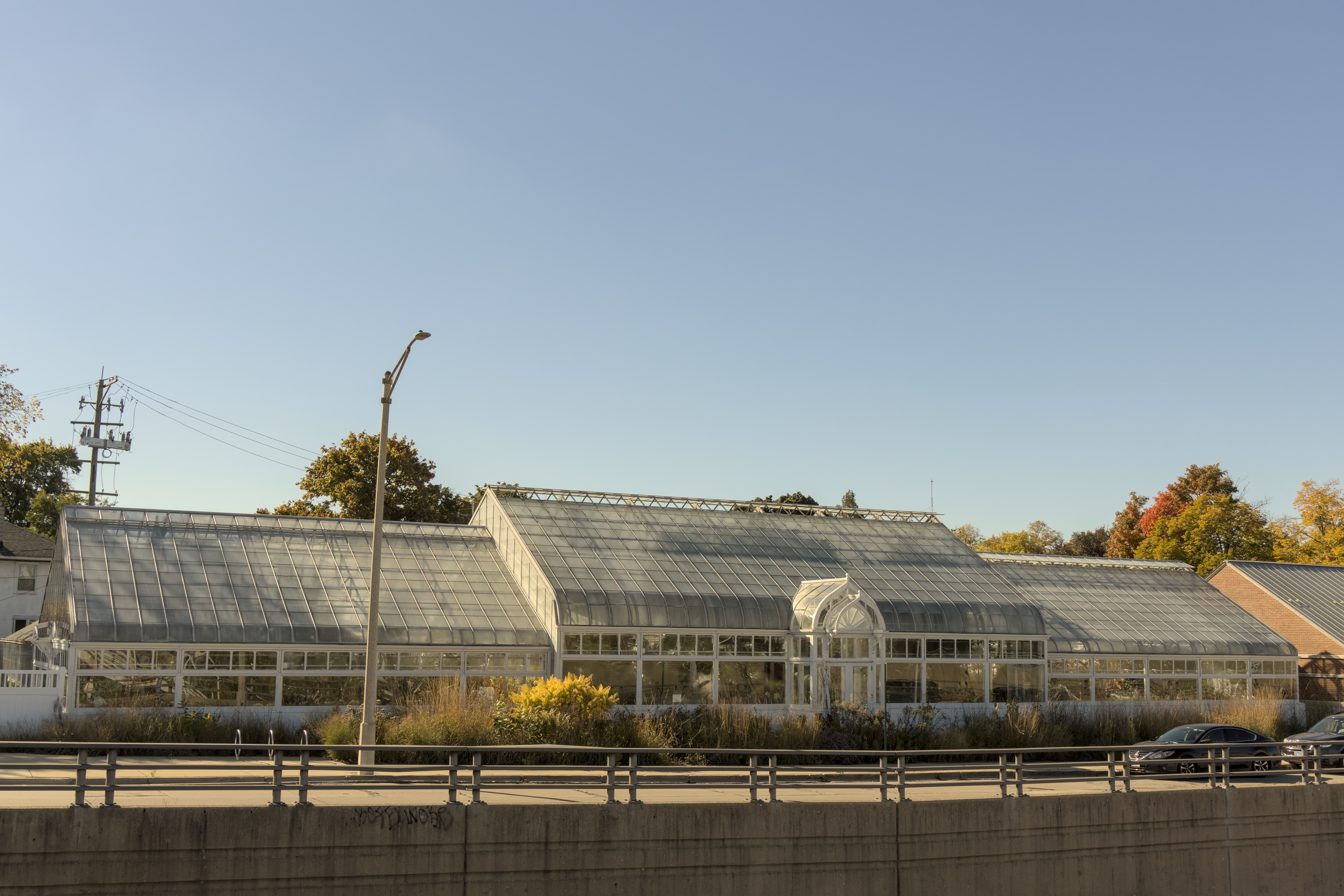
Oak Park Conservatory

Marking its 90th anniversary in 2019, the Conservatory has installed solar panels on the roof to lower electricity costs and offset CO_{2} emissions. Three beehives are now part of the conservatory, for pollination. Five cisterns were installed to collect rainwater, which will be used to water plants in the conservatory and in summer, elsewhere in the village. A compost tea system has been set up to improve soil quality in the greenhouses.

== Major collections ==
The desert collection includes three cactus groups (Cereus, Opuntia, and Pereskia), plus succulents including Agave, Crassula, succulent euphorbias, Gasteria, Haworthia, and Kalanchoe. Woody plants in this room include olive, etrog, fig, date palm, bay and pomegranate.

The conservatory's orchids and ferns collection holds orchids, Australian tree ferns and other tropic and sub-tropic fern species, as well as begonias, Clivia, Ponderosa lemon, sea grape, Strelitzia reginae, and Syzygium. The rainforest collection includes Anthurium, aroids, banana, cycads, dracaenas, ferns, fig trees, Monstera deliciosa, palms (lady, fishtail, fan, and Canary Island date), papaya, Peperomia, Pilea, spider plants, as well as a pond with koi, goldfish, and turtles.

In addition to its collections, the conservatory grows about 20,000 bedding plants annually for planting in public parks and sites throughout Oak Park.

== Century plant ==
The Conservatory collection includes agave americana, commonly known as the century plant for the long decades until it blooms. Twice since 1980, a plant shot up its flower stalk taller than the greenhouse roof, so the glass was removed. The plant in bloom is visible to traffic on nearby roads. In 2013, the bloom time was cut short by a severe storm, cutting the 6 inches (15 cm) diameter stem at the roofline. The plant died as is usual after the bloom.

== Friends of the Oak Park Conservatory ==
The Oak Park Conservatory has professional staff. Its extensive network of volunteers works under the name of Friends of the Oak Park Conservatory (or FOPCON), since 1986. The Conservatory director hired in 1984, John Seaton, asked the volunteers to organize themselves, which they did in 1986; since then, they have raised over $840,000 for Conservatory improvements. Volunteers organize a plant sale in early May each year to raise funds for the Conservatory, and supply gardeners with an interesting variety of plants. It began as the Herb and Scented Plant Sale, and has changed over time to include edibles and ornamental plants, grown without pesticides in the greenhouses of the Conservatory. The volunteer web site includes information for gardeners, and the list of events for the year. Besides the plant sale, there are two perennial plant exchanges, spring and fall. Gardeners bring in healthy plants from their own gardens, to exchange for other types from plants brought by other gardeners. FOPCON also offers a garden walk through admirable local gardens as another fund raising event in June. Tours of the Conservatory are offered for groups and for schools, led by the volunteers.

== See also ==
- List of botanical gardens in the United States
