= Robert P. Parker House =

Historic house in Oak Park, Illinois

- U.S. Historic district – Contributing property
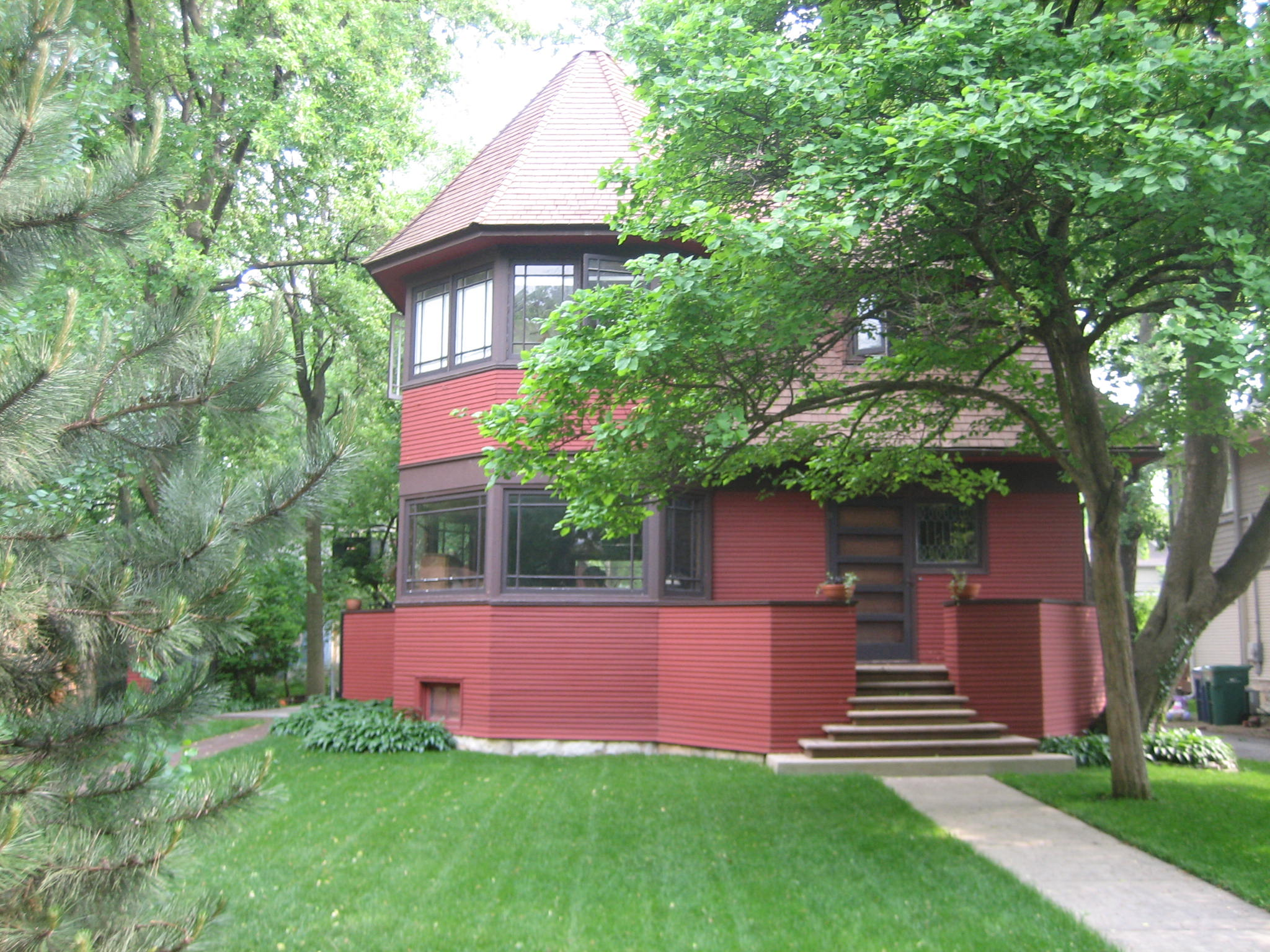

- Location within Illinois Location within the United States
- Location: 1019 Chicago Avenue, Oak Park, Illinois, United States
- Coordinates: 41°53′38″N 87°48′2″W
- Built: 1892
- Architect: Frank Lloyd Wright
- Architectural style: Queen Anne
- Part of: Frank Lloyd Wright-Prairie School of Architecture Historic District (ID73000699)
- Added to NRHP: December 4, 1973

The Robert P. Parker House is a home at 1019 Chicago Avenue in Oak Park, a suburb of Chicago, Illinois, United States. The house was designed by American architect Frank Lloyd Wright in 1892 and is an example of his early work. Real-estate agent Thomas H. Gale had it built and sold it to Robert P. Parker later that year. The house was designed by Wright independently while he was still employed by the firm Adler & Sullivan, run by engineer Dankmar Adler and architect, Louis Sullivan; taking outside commissions was something that Sullivan forbade. The Parker House is listed as a contributing property to a U.S. federally Registered Historic District.

== History ==
The Robert P. Parker House is one of three houses along Chicago Avenue in Oak Park which have come to be known as American architect Frank Lloyd Wright's "Bootleg Houses." The triplet of houses includes the Thomas H. Gale House and the Walter Gale House as well as the Parker House and they were designed by Wright independently while he was still employed by Adler and Sullivan. Architect Louis Sullivan loaned Wright money during the construction of his own home and studio and Wright was working it off at the firm. Independent work was forbidden by Sullivan. The Parker house is especially similar to the Thomas H. Gale House. The houses were designed on a speculative basis for Wright neighbor Walter Gale in 1892. In all, Wright designed nine "bootleg houses" moonlighting while still under contract with Sullivan. When Sullivan found out about the side projects, in late 1892 or early 1893, Wright was dismissed. The Parker House is one of four that still stand.

They were built later that same year, 1892, by real-estate agent Thomas Gale, who sold the Parker House to attorney Robert Parker. The three houses were part of a series of homes that had nearly identical plans with only small differences. They include the aforementioned Walter Gale House and Thomas H. Gale House, the Francis Woolley House, also located in Oak Park, and the Robert G. Emmond House in LaGrange, Illinois. Parker, an attorney, bought the house from the Gales early on in the building process as his name appears on the plans.

== Architecture ==
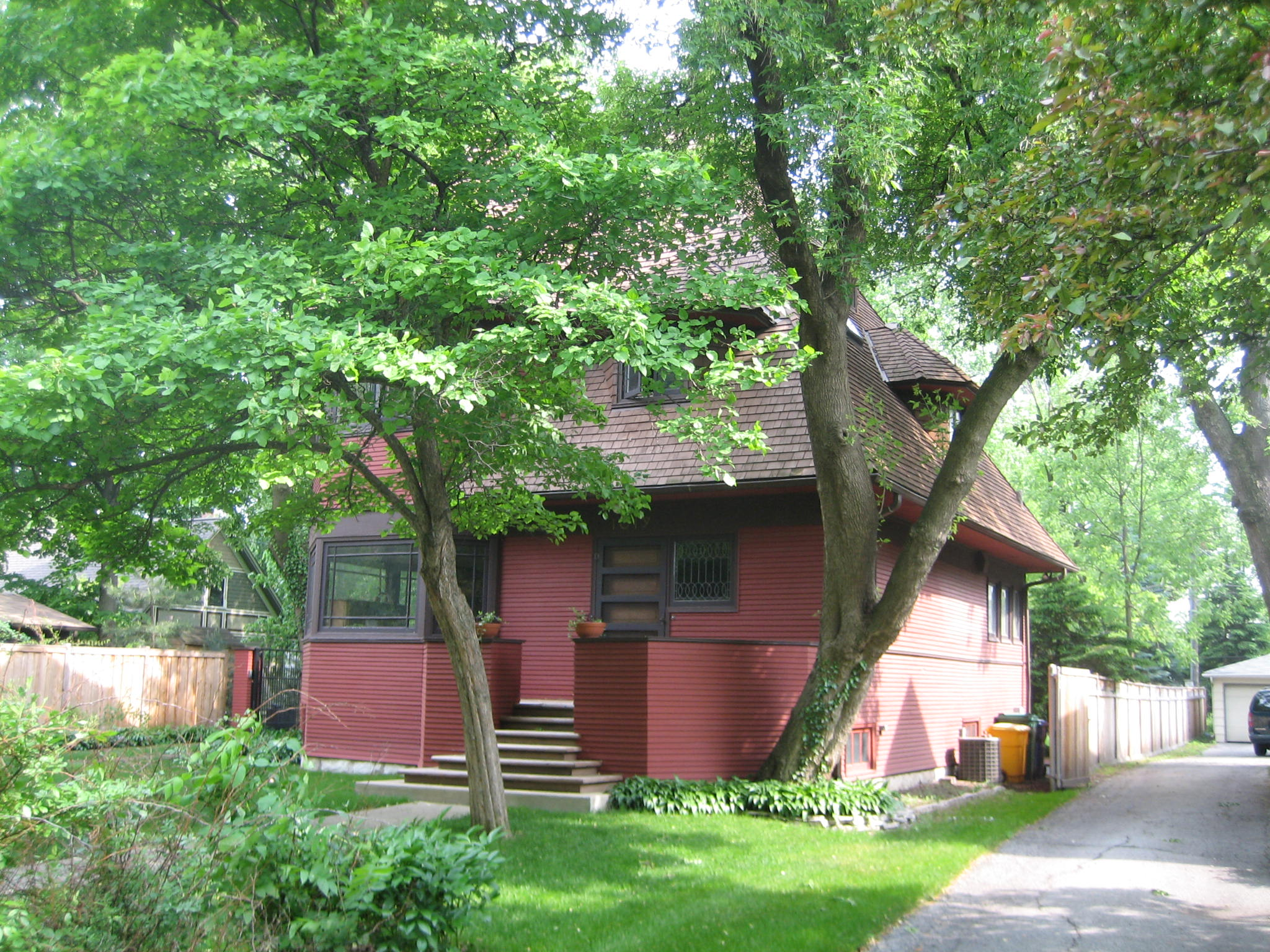
The polygonal dormers on the Parker House are featured in all of the bootleg houses that survive.

The design for the Parker House and the Thomas Gale House, and to some extent the Walter Gale House, were derived from the more expensive Emmond House in LaGrange. The homes all feature irregular roof composition with high pitches and polygonal dormers. The Parker House reflects the style of Wright's first teacher Joseph Silsbee. Sullivan's influence can also be seen in the taut masses of the house, his philosophy of "geometric simplification" is evident in the Parker House's design. While generally cast in the Queen Anne style of architecture the Parker House has more ample rounded forms than the common Queen Anne homes being built at the time.

The small size is deceiving as the Parker House is spacious. The turret bays have walls that are more than half consisted of windows. The fireplace is set in the center of the house which allows it to heat and service two rooms, the parlor and the dining room. The side elevations of the Parker House are symmetrical but adjacent buildings are built too close for the design to be seen clearly.

== Significance ==
Though small in size and adorned with inexpensive detailing, the Parker House and the Gale House are of significance because of what they reveal about Frank Lloyd Wright's development as an architect. The house is listed as a contributing property to the Frank Lloyd Wright–Prairie School of Architecture Historic District. The historic district was added to the U.S. National Register of Historic Places on December 4, 1973.

== See also ==
- List of Frank Lloyd Wright works
