= Thomas H. Gale House =

Historic house in Oak Park, Illinois

- U.S. Historic district – Contributing property
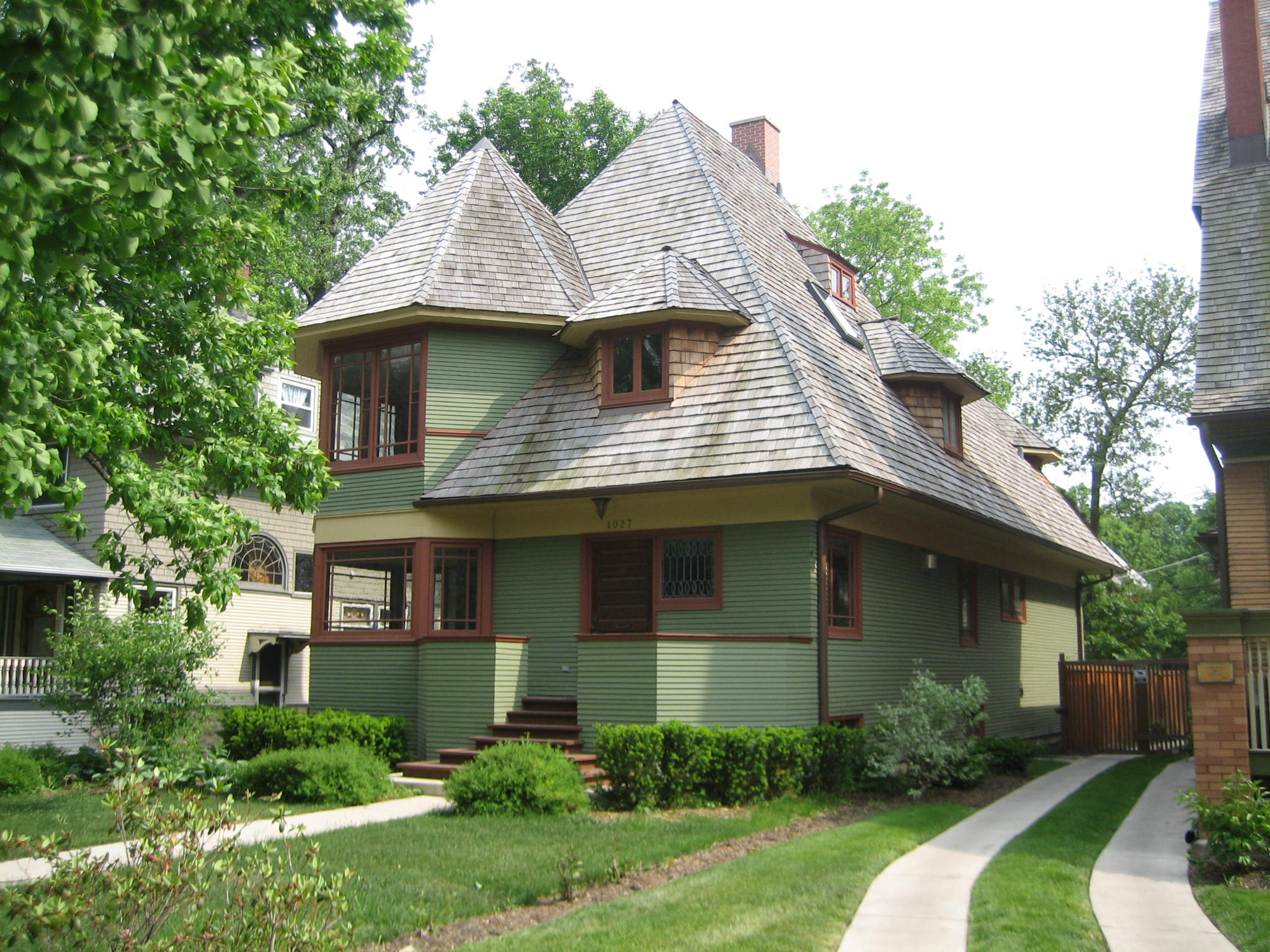

- Location within Illinois Location within the United States
- Location: 1027 Chicago Ave., Oak Park, Illinois, United States
- Coordinates: 41°53′38″N 87°48′6″W
- Built: 1892
- Architect: Frank Lloyd Wright
- Architectural style: Queen Anne
- Part of: Frank Lloyd Wright-Prairie School of Architecture Historic District (ID73000699)
- Added to NRHP: December 4, 1973

The Thomas H. Gale House, or simply Thomas Gale House, is a home at 1027 Chicago Avenue in Oak Park, a suburb of Chicago, Illinois, United States. The house was designed by famous American architect Frank Lloyd Wright in 1892 and is an example of his early work. The house was designed by Wright independently while he was still employed in the architecture firm of Adler & Sullivan, run by engineer Dankmar Adler and architect, Louis Sullivan; taking outside commissions was something that Sullivan forbade. The house is significant because of what it shows about Wright's early development period. The Parker House is listed as contributing property to a U.S. federally Registered Historic District. The house was designated an Oak Park Landmark in 2002.

== History ==
The Thomas H. Gale House is one of three houses along Chicago Avenue in Oak Park, which belong to a group known as American architect Frank Lloyd Wright's "Bootleg Houses". This trio of houses, also including the Robert P. Parker House and the Walter Gale House, were designed by Wright independently while he was still employed by Adler and Sullivan. Architect Louis Sullivan loaned Wright money during the construction of his own home and studio, and Wright was working it off at the firm; independent work was forbidden by Sullivan. The Thomas Gale house is especially similar to the Robert P. Parker House. In all, Wright designed at least eight "bootleg houses" moonlighting while still under contract with Sullivan. When Sullivan found out about the side projects, in late 1892 or early 1893, Wright was dismissed. The Thomas Gale House is one of at least four which still stand; sources vary as to the exact numbers.

The three bootleg houses were part of a series of homes which had small differences but nearly identical plans. They include the aforementioned Walter Gale House and Parker House, the Francis Woolley House, also located in Oak Park, and the Robert G. Emmond House in La Grange, Illinois. Thomas H. Gale, a prominent Oak Park citizen, purchased six adjacent lots on Chicago Avenue from his father, Edwin, in 1891 when he married Laura Robeson. He selected Wright to design his home and construction began in July 1892 at a cost of US$3,000. During the summer of 1892, the Gales lived with Thomas Gale's parents until their home was complete at the end of the year. The next year, Thomas' brother Walter purchased the lot adjacent to the Thomas Gale House and commissioned Wright to design his home, as well; the commission was Wright's first after leaving Adler and Sullivan.

== Architecture ==
The design for the Thomas Gale House and the Parker House, and to some extent the Walter Gale House, were derived from the more expensive Emmond House in La Grange. The homes all feature irregular roof composition with high pitches and polygonal dormers. The Thomas Gale House reflects the style of Wright's first teacher Joseph Silsbee. Sullivan's influence can also be seen in the taut masses of the house, his philosophy of "geometric simplification" is evident in the Parker House's design. While generally cast in the Queen Anne style, the Parker House has more ample rounded forms than the common Queen Anne homes being built at the time.

The small size is deceiving as the Thomas Gale House is spacious. The turret bays have walls that are more than half consisted of windows. The fireplace is set in the center of the house which allows it to heat and service two rooms, the parlor and the dining room. The side elevations of the Gale House are symmetrical but adjacent buildings are built too close for the design to be seen clearly.

The house is designed in a rectangular plan and is supported by a stone foundation. The exterior is clad in wooden clapboard. The building has a high-pitched, hip roof which features polygonal dormers, a brick chimney and overhanging eaves (a feature that would later become common to Wright's Prairie style). On the northeast and southeast corners of the building are polygonal towers with conical roofs. The tower windows, arranged in horizontal bands (another common Prairie element), are a mix of casement windows and fixed windows. The current front porch replaced a non-original porch with iron railings. The non-original porch is seen in illustrations in the architectural guide map published by the Frank Lloyd Wright Preservation Trust. The front elevation also has a dormer with a pair of casement windows.

== Significance ==
Though small in size and adorned with inexpensive detailing the Thomas Gale House, along with the Parker House, are of significance because of what they reveal about Frank Lloyd Wright's development as an architect. The house is listed as a contributing property to the Frank Lloyd Wright-Prairie School of Architecture Historic District. The historic district was added to the U.S. National Register of Historic Places on December 4, 1973. The Thomas Gale House was declared a local Oak Park Landmark on November 18, 2002.

At first glance, the Thomas Gale House, along with the other bootleg houses, appear to devolve from the early promise of Wright's James Charnley House by including such historical styles as Colonial Revival, Queen Anne and Dutch Colonial. However, the houses illustrate Wright's burgeoning individuality as he adapted the styles to fit his own vision. The Thomas Gale and Parker Houses in particular represent a more streamlined version of the traditional Queen Anne style design. The houses incorporate rectilinear features which would later become hallmarks of Wright's fully mature Prairie design.

== See also ==
- List of Frank Lloyd Wright works
