= Walter Gale House =

Historic house in Oak Park, Illinois

- Walter H. Gale House
- U.S. National Register of Historic Places
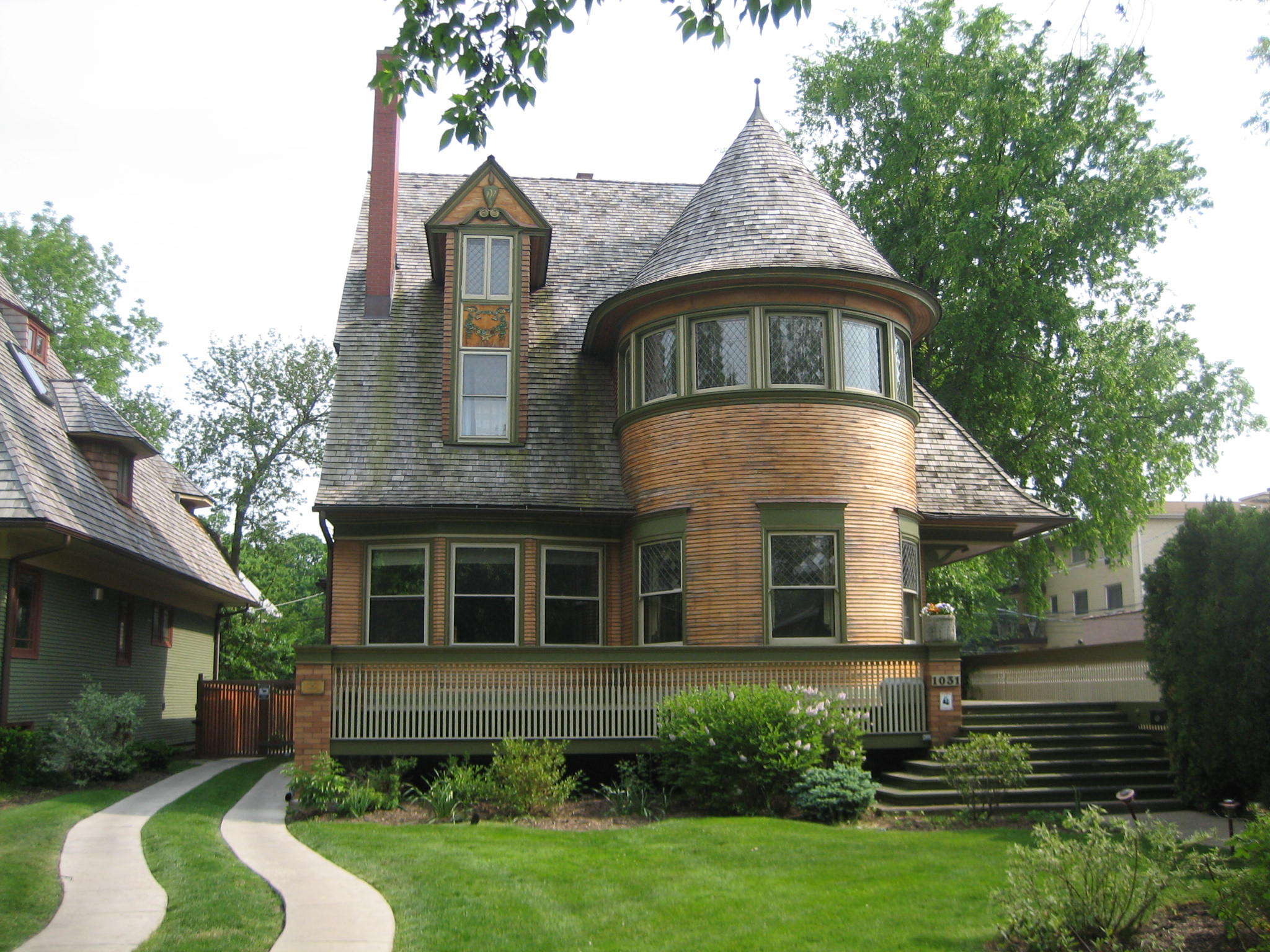

- Location within Chicago metropolitan area Location within Illinois Location within the United States
- Interactive map showing the location of Walter H. Gale House
- Location: 1031 W. Chicago Ave., Oak Park, Illinois
- Coordinates: 41°53′38″N 87°48′6″W
- Area: 0.4 acres (0.16 ha)
- Built: 1893
- Architect: Frank Lloyd Wright
- Architectural style: Queen Anne
- NRHP reference No.: 73000700
- Added to NRHP: August 17, 1973

The Walter H. Gale House is a house in Oak Park, a suburb of Chicago in Illinois, United States. It was designed by Frank Lloyd Wright and constructed in 1893. The house was commissioned by Walter H. Gale of a prominent Oak Park family and is the first home Wright designed after leaving the firm of Adler & Sullivan (run by engineer Dankmar Adler and architect, Louis Sullivan). The Gale House was listed on the U.S. National Register of Historic Places on August 17, 1973.

== History ==
The house was designed by Frank Lloyd Wright in 1893 for Walter H. Gale, who was a member of one of Oak Park's "founding families" and a local hardware store operator. The house was the first design undertaken after he left Louis Sullivan's firm, Adler & Sullivan. The house followed on in the nature of Wright's own home and was one of a series of modest homes designed in 1892 and 1893. Two of these homes were designed for Walter Gale on a speculative basis, the other being known as the Robert P. Parker House, which stand down Chicago Avenue from the Gale House. The Gale House, like all of the homes designed in this "series," has symmetrical sides but they are difficult to see clearly because other buildings are built too closely. The Gale House appears small but is quite roomy and it follows nearly identical plans to that of the other homes designed and built around 1893, though there are differences, most prominently in the roof profiles. It is currently a private residence.

== Architecture ==
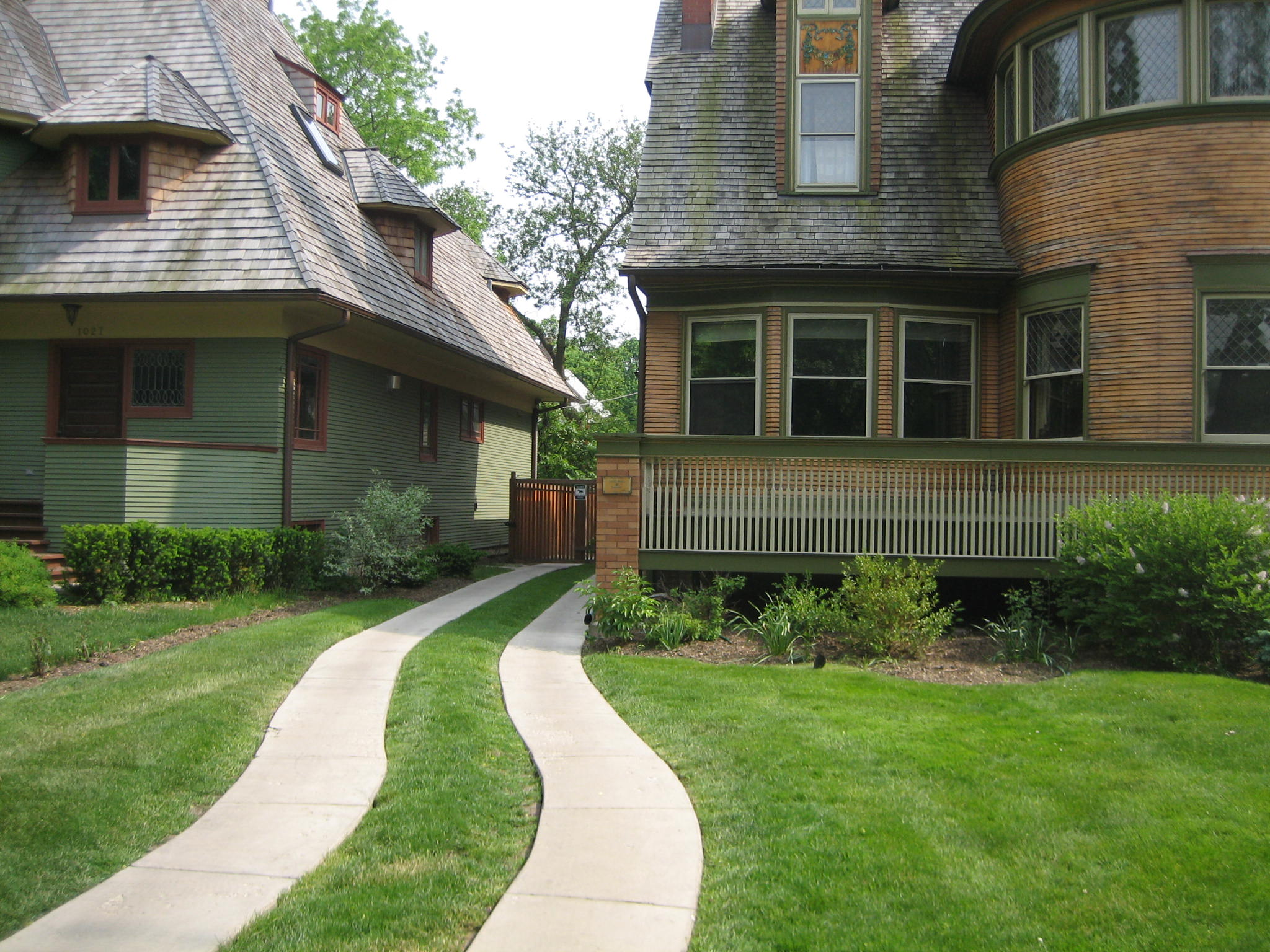
By suburban American standards the Gale House is quite close to other structures. The house on the left is another Frank Lloyd Wright building, the Thomas H. Gale House.

The house is designed in a geometric Queen Anne style and demonstrates Wright's predilection for informal planning. The Queen Anne design, influenced by Wright's first teacher, Louis Sullivan, demonstrates just how far Wright had to go before his early modern style, known as Prairie style, was fully mature. The Gale House is clearly a Queen Anne style home, evidence of this can be found in the complexity of the massing, the dormer details, Palladian windows in the side gables and the varied textures of shingles, siding and brick as well as diamond pane and leaded glass. Despite the evident Queen Anne elements, the Gale House has a geometric purity which is unconventional. It represents the beginning of Wright's move to free himself from the constraints of historic design styles.

The frame construction home is built upon a granite foundation with an exterior covering of mostly narrow clapboards. The original diamond-pane, leaded glass casement windows are intact. On the interior the home's ground floor consists of a stairway, reception room, living room, dining room, kitchen and pantry. The hall is paneled in oiled birch and has a railing with "highly attenuated balusters framing the stairs." The second floor features four bedrooms, one with a bathroom and fireplace. The third floor houses a large room laid out on an east–west axis.

== Significance ==
The house is one of the earliest independent designs by Frank Lloyd Wright and is especially important as a link in Wright's evolution from a more traditional style to the later designs of his early modern style. The house, listed on the U.S. National Register of Historic Places on August 17, 1973, also shows the effect that Louis Sullivan had on the young architect and the eventual disciplined and geometric direction Wright went with his designs. The house was designated a local landmark by the village of Oak Park on the same day it was listed on the National Register.

== See also ==
- List of Frank Lloyd Wright works
- National Register of Historic Places listings in Cook County, Illinois
