= Oak Park, Illinois =

- Village
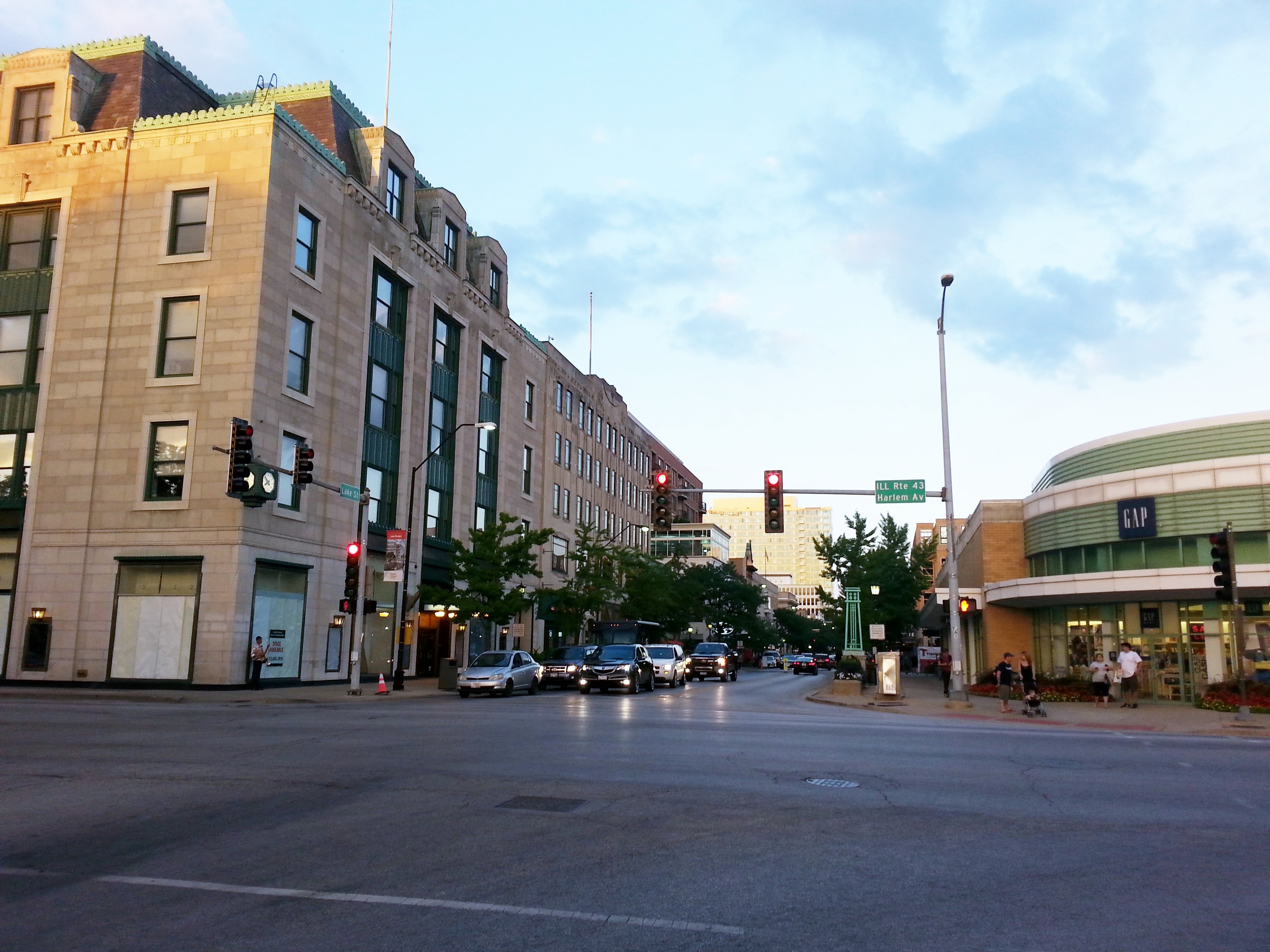
- Lake Street at dusk

- Flag Logo
- Interactive map of Oak Park, Illinois
- Location within Greater Chicago Location within Illinois Location within the United States
- Coordinates: 41°53′18″N 87°47′22″W
- Country: United States
- State: Illinois
- County: Cook
- Township: Oak Park
- Settled: 1835
- Incorporated (village): 1902

Government
  - Type: Oak Park Board of Trustees

Area
  - Total: 4.70 sq mi (12.17 km^{2})
  - Land: 4.70 sq mi (12.17 km^{2})
  - Water: 0 sq mi (0.00 km^{2})
- Elevation: 620 ft (190 m)

Population (2020)
  - Total: 51,282
  - Density: 11,613.9/sq mi (4,484.14/km^{2})
- Demonym: Oak Parker
- Time zone: UTC−6 (CST)
  - Summer (DST): UTC−5 (CDT)
- ZIP code(s): 60301 to 60304
- Area code: 708
- FIPS code: 17-54885
- Website: oak-park.us

Oak Park is a village in Cook County, Illinois, United States, adjacent to Chicago. It is the 26th-most populous municipality in Illinois, with a population of 54,318 as of the 2020 census. Oak Park was first settled in 1835 and later incorporated in 1902, when it separated from Cicero. It is closely tied to the smaller village of River Forest sharing a chamber of commerce and a high school, Oak Park and River Forest High School.

Architect Frank Lloyd Wright and his wife settled in Oak Park in 1889, and his work heavily influenced local architecture and design, including the Frank Lloyd Wright Home and Studio. Over the years, rapid development was spurred by railroads and streetcars connecting the village to jobs in nearby Chicago. In 1968, Oak Park enacted an Open Housing Ordinance, which helped devise strategies to racially integrate the village and prevent white flight.

Oak Park became and remains a multicultural, politically progressive community, with 80% or higher voter turnout in every presidential election since 2000. Oak Park has several public transportation links to Chicago with Chicago Transit Authority access via the Green Line and Blue Line "L" train lines, as well as the Metra Union Pacific West Line Oak Park station downtown.

== History ==
In 1835, Joseph and Betty Kettlestrings, immigrants from Yorkshire, England, staked out a farm and built a house near Lake Street and Harlem Avenue, west of Chicago. Once their children were born, they moved to Chicago for the schools in 1843, and moved back again in 1855 to build a more substantial home a bit east on their quarter section of land. More farmers and settlers had entered the area. Their land was called by several names locally, including Oak Ridge, Harlem, and Kettlestrings Grove. When the first post office was set up, it could not use the name Oak Ridge, as another post office was using that name in Illinois, so the post office chose Oak Park, and that name became the name for the settlement as it grew, and for the town when it incorporated in 1902.

By 1850, the Galena and Chicago Union Railroad (after that, the Chicago & Northwestern and now Union Pacific) was constructed as far as Elgin, Illinois, and passed through the settlement area. In the 1850s the land on which Oak Park sits was part of the new Chicago suburb, the town of Cicero. The population of the area boomed during the 1870s, with Chicago residents resettling in Cicero following the Great Chicago Fire of 1871 and the expansion of railroads and streetcars to the area. "In 1872, when Oak Park received its own railroad depot on the Chicago and Northwestern Railway, its rapid emergence as a residential suburb of Chicago began. In 1877, the railroad was running thirty-nine trains daily between Oak Park and Chicago; in the subsequent year, more railroads and streetcar lines, with increased service, came to link Oak Park and Chicago. As Chicago grew from a regional center to a national metropolis Oak Park expanded – from 500 residents in 1872 to 1,812 in 1890, to 9,353 in 1900, to 20,911 in 1910, to 39,585 in 1920. Oak Park thus emerged as a leading Chicago suburb."

A review of Oak Park's history by Wiss, Janny, Elstner Associates in 2006 further explains the importance of railroads and streetcars in the development of Oak Park:

As suburban residential development continued in the 1880s and 1890s, streetcars and elevated trains supplemented the original main line steam railroads to connect Oak Park commuters to jobs in downtown Chicago. One of the first streetcar lines was the Chicago, Harlem, & Batavia "dummy" line, which ran approximately along the present-day route of the Eisenhower Expressway. The "dummy" trains used a miniature steam locomotive with a false cladding designed to conceal most of the moving parts and avoid startling horses. This line first began operation in 1881, but did not provide direct commuter service to downtown Chicago until June 1888. A more extensive streetcar network throughout Oak Park was opened in 1890. In the future village of Oak Park, this system ran east-west on Madison Street and Lake Street, with a north-south connection on Harlem Avenue. Streetcar service was discontinued in 1947, to be replaced by buses. The Lake Street Elevated Railroad (today's CTA Green Line) was extended into Oak Park in 1899–1901, although the trains ran at ground level until the 1960s. The Metropolitan West Side Elevated Railroad (today's CTA Blue Line) was extended into Oak Park in 1905, providing local service over tracks originally placed by the Chicago Aurora & Elgin electric interurban train. The "Met" line moved onto new tracks along the Congress (Eisenhower) Expressway in 1958.

The Village of Oak Park was formally established in 1902, disengaging from Cicero following a referendum. According to the local historical society, "The period 1892–1950 saw the construction of almost all of the housing stock in Oak Park, and most of the village's current buildings." The village population grew quickly, and "by 1930, the village had a population of 64,000, even larger than the current population," while cherishing a reputation as the "World's Largest Village". Chicago grew rapidly in the 19th century, recording 4,470 residents in the 1840 census, reaching 1,099,850 in 1890, and 1,698,575 in 1900. Chicago surpassed Philadelphia to be the second-largest US city, and in that year, the fifth-largest in the world. Chicago's location on the shores of Lake Michigan was good for transport; after the fire of 1871, Chicago rebuilt its center. Oak Park grew along with its neighbor to the east, having location and railroad and streetcar connections in its favor.

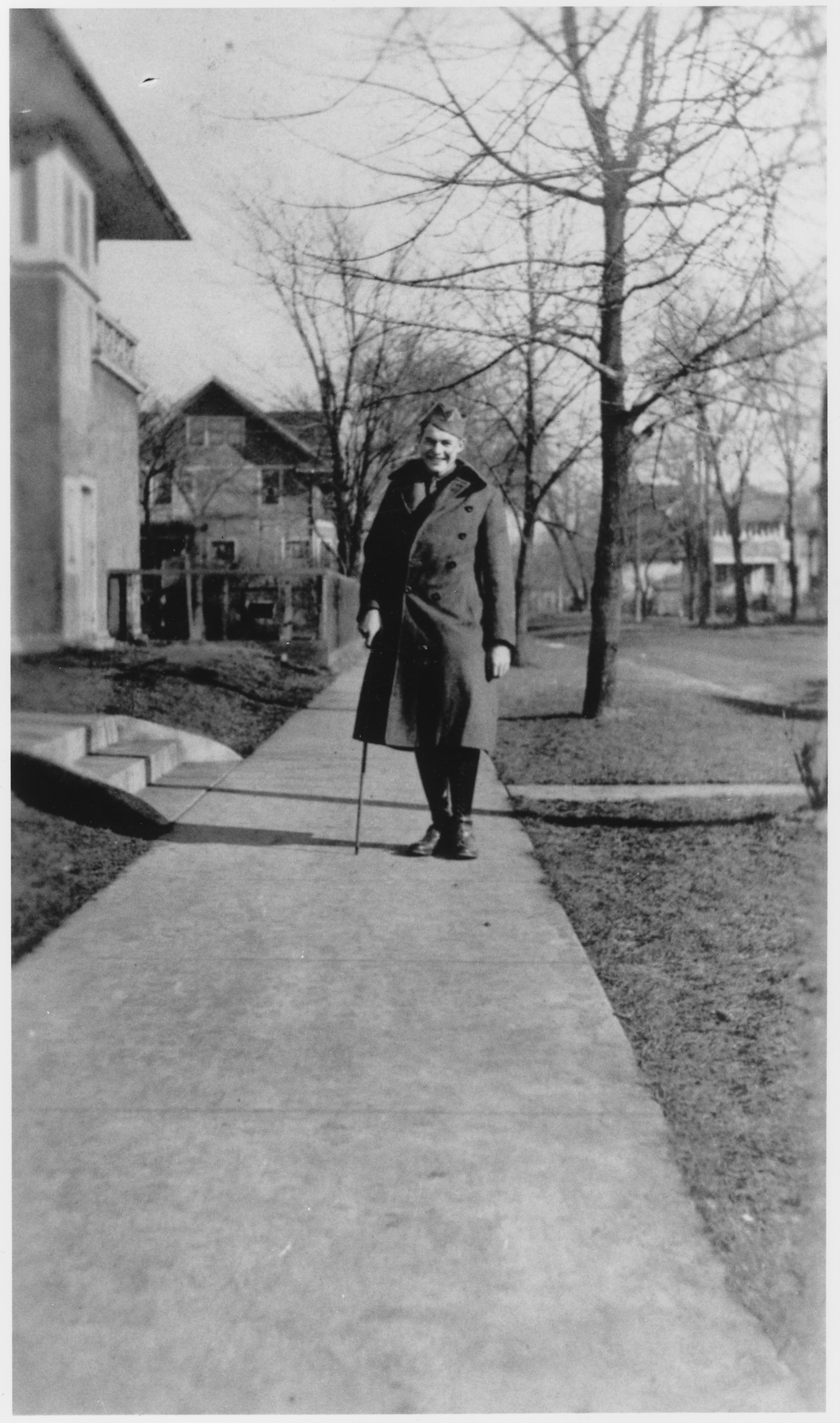
Ernest Hemingway in Oak Park, 1919

After World War II, Oak Park was affected by larger developmental trends in the Chicago Metropolitan area. The construction of the Eisenhower Expressway cut through the southern portion of the Village in the mid-1950s. Starting in the 1960s and 1970s, Oak Park has made a conscious effort to accommodate changing demographics and social pressures while maintaining the suburban character that has long made the Village a desirable residential location. Beginning in the 1960s, Oak Park faced the issue of racial integration with effective programs to maintain the character and stability of the Village, while encouraging integration on racial basis. This included passage of The Open Housing Ordinance in 1968 which has helped maintain the ethnically diverse population seen in the village still today.

Oak Park has a history of alcohol prohibition. When the village was incorporated, no alcohol was allowed to be sold within its village limits. This law was relaxed in 1973, when restaurants and hotels were allowed to serve alcohol with meals, and was further loosened in 2002, when select grocery stores received governmental permission to sell packaged liquor. Today, alcohol, such as beer and wine, is easily accessible, with many bars and cocktail lounges around the village.

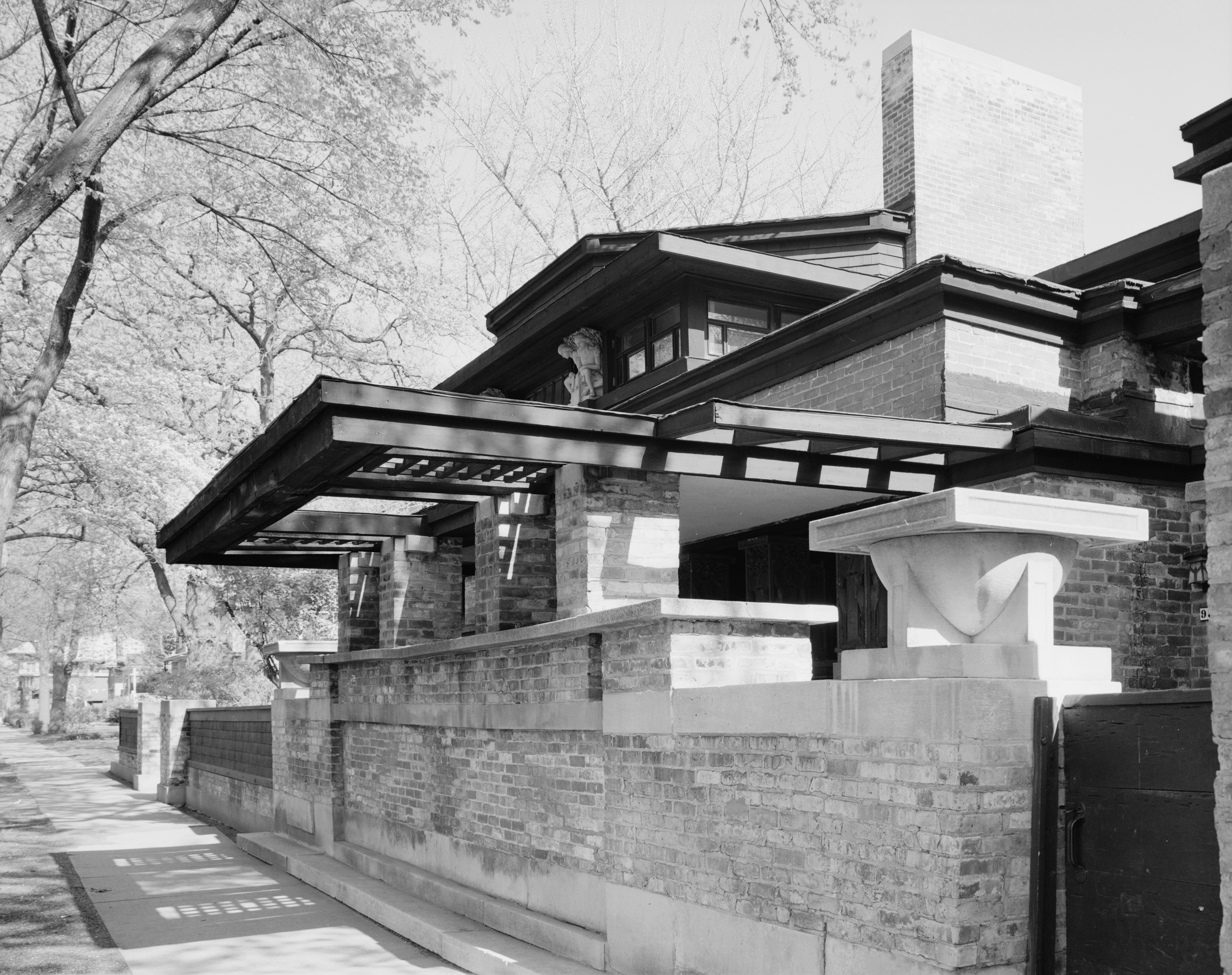
The business entrance of Frank Lloyd Wright's Home and Studio in Oak Park

In 1889, Frank Lloyd Wright and his wife Catherine Tobin settled in Oak Park. He built many homes and the Unity Temple, his own church, in the village, before he left in 1911 to settle in Wisconsin. Oak Park attracts architecture buffs and others to view the many Wright-designed homes found in the village, alongside homes reflecting other architectural styles. The largest collection of Wright-designed residential properties in the world is in Oak Park. A distinct focus on historic preservation of important architectural styles began in the 1970s and continues, with many buildings marked as historically significant, and so far, three historic districts defined. Other attractions include Ernest Hemingway's birthplace home and his boyhood home, the Ernest Hemingway Museum, the three Oak Park homes of writer and Tarzan creator Edgar Rice Burroughs, Wright's Unity Temple, Pleasant Home, and the Oak Park-River Forest Historical Society.

In 2025 the village hall faced significant turnover, with nine senior officials leaving and citing a "toxic" workplace.

== Geography ==
Oak Park is located immediately west of the city of Chicago. The boundary between the two municipalities is Austin Boulevard on the east side of Oak Park and North Avenue/Illinois Route 64 on the village's north side. Oak Park borders Cicero along its southern border, Roosevelt Road/Illinois Route 38, from Austin to Lombard; and Berwyn from Lombard to Harlem Avenue. Harlem/Illinois Route 43 serves as its western border, where between Roosevelt and South Boulevard, it borders Forest Park and between North Boulevard and North Avenue to the west it borders River Forest.

The entire village of Oak Park lies on the shore of ancient Lake Chicago, which covered most of the city of Chicago during the last Ice Age, and was the forerunner to today's Lake Michigan. Ridgeland Avenue in eastern Oak Park marks the shoreline of the lake, and was once an actual ridge. As with the geographical setup of the Chicago River, which connects to the present day Lake Michigan just north of the city's Loop, the ancient Des Plaines river once emptied into glacial Lake Chicago, making prehistoric Oak Park a "Plains river Delta" system. One of North America's four continental divides runs through Oak Park. This divide, a slight rise running north–south through the village, separates the Saint Lawrence River watershed from the Mississippi River watershed, and is marked by one plaque on Lake Street at Forest Avenue and another in the northwest corner of Taylor Park.

According to the 2010 census, Oak Park has a total area of 4.7 sq mi (12.17 km^{2}), all land.

=== Points of interest ===
- Birthplace of Ernest Hemingway
- Frank Lloyd Wright Home and Studio
- Unity Temple, designed by Frank Lloyd Wright
- Frank Lloyd Wright–Prairie School of Architecture Historic District
- Ridgeland–Oak Park Historic District
- Edgar Rice Burroughs homes
- Oak Park Conservatory

=== Architecture and historic districts ===
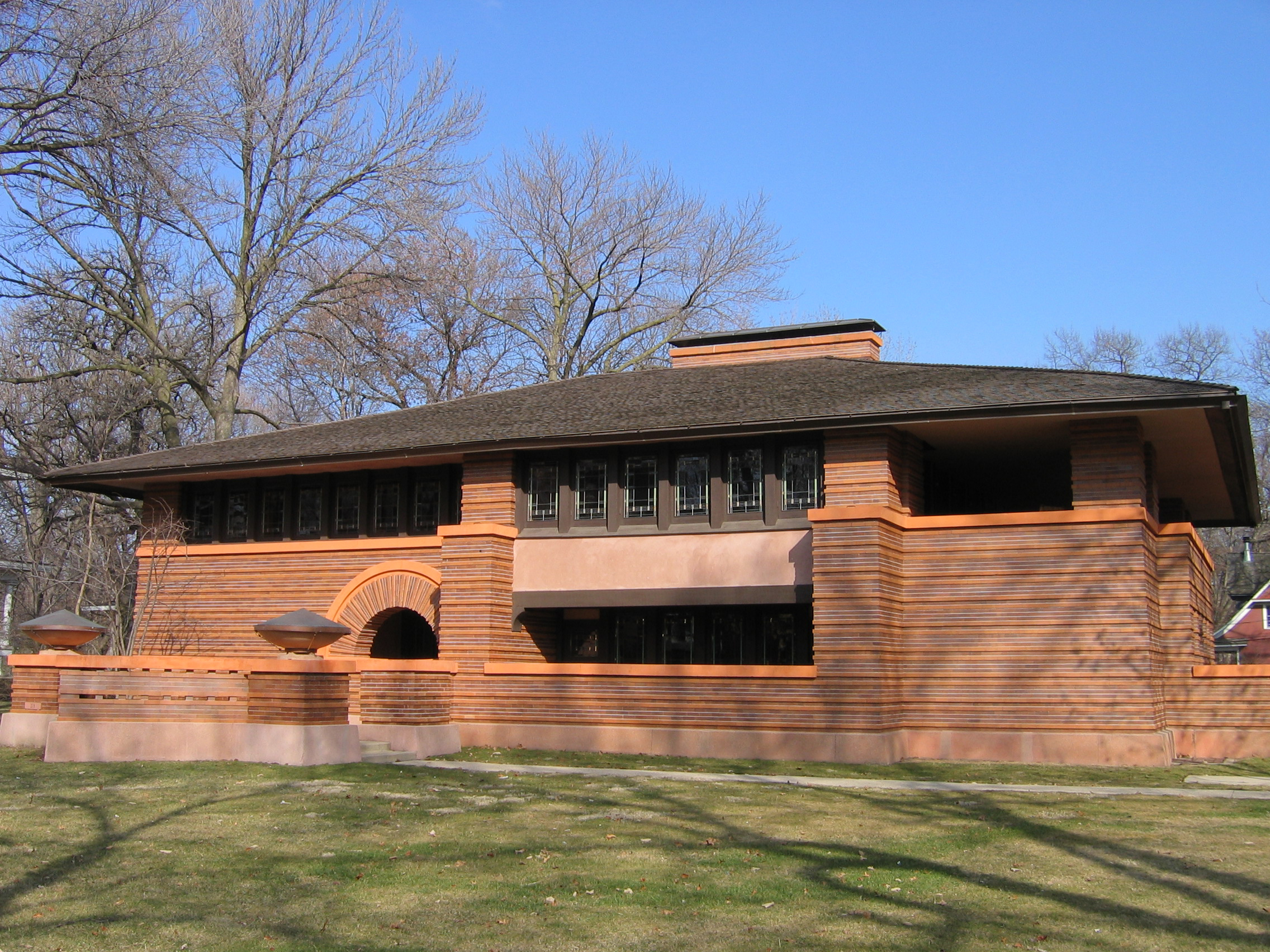
Frank Lloyd Wright's 1902 Arthur Heurtley House on Forest Avenue

Frank Lloyd Wright spent the first 20 years of his 70-year career in Oak Park, building numerous homes in the community, including his own and the Walter Gale House. He lived and worked in the area between 1889 and 1909. One can find Wright's earliest work here, such as the Winslow House in neighboring River Forest, Illinois. Also, examples of the first prairie-style houses are in Oak Park. He also designed Unity Temple, a Unitarian-Universalist church, which was built between 1905 and 1908. Several well-known architects and artists worked in Wright's Oak Park Studio, including Richard Bock, William Eugene Drummond, Marion Mahony Griffin, and Walter Burley Griffin.

Many buildings in Oak Park were built by other Prairie School architects, such as George W. Maher, John Van Bergen, and E.E. Roberts.

Oak Park's housing stock reflects the decades of its rapid growth while it was part of the town of Cicero, and since 1902, when it became a village. Historic preservation has been a priority since an ordinance passed in 1972 and since revised. There are 2,400 historic sites in Oak Park, the majority of which are homes built in the Queen Anne, Prairie School and Craftsman styles of architecture. The Village of Oak Park displays these online on an interactive website. Three historic districts recognize the variety of styles often standing next door to each other. The three districts are Frank Lloyd Wright, Ridgeland-Oak Park, and Seward Gunderson, outlined on a map from the village. A fourth district is under consideration as of 2015, of 176 homes built by Thomas Henry Hulbert.

Ernest Hemingway spent the first six years of his life at 339 N. Oak Park Ave. The house was returned to its original 1890s Victorian heritage after restoration in 1992 and is open to the public for tours through The Ernest Hemingway Foundation of Oak Park.

The Art Deco-style main post office on Lake Street was designed by White and Weber in 1933. It is part of the Ridgeland-Oak Park Historic District.

== Demographics ==
Historical population
Census	Pop.	Note	%±
1910	19,444		—
1920	39,858		105.0%
1930	63,982		60.5%
1940	66,015		3.2%
1950	63,529		−3.8%
1960	61,093		−3.8%
1970	62,511		2.3%
1980	54,887		−12.2%
1990	53,648		−2.3%
2000	52,524		−2.1%
2010	51,878		−1.2%
2020	54,583		5.2%
U.S. Decennial Census; 2010 2020

=== Racial and ethnic composition ===
Oak Park village, Illinois – Racial and ethnic composition Note: the US Census treats Hispanic/Latino as an ethnic category. This table excludes Latinos from the racial categories and assigns them to a separate category. Hispanics/Latinos may be of any race.
Race / Ethnicity (NH = Non-Hispanic)	Pop 2000	Pop 2010	Pop 2020	% 2000	% 2010	% 2020
White alone (NH)	34,767	33,076	32,846	66.19%	63.76%	60.18%
Black or African American alone (NH)	11,685	11,023	10,200	22.25%	21.25%	18.69%
Native American or Alaska Native alone (NH)	61	65	29	0.12%	0.13%	0.05%
Asian alone (NH)	2,171	2,474	2,944	4.13%	4.77%	5.39%
Pacific Islander alone (NH)	16	15	12	0.03%	0.03%	0.02%
Other race alone (NH)	185	178	285	0.35%	0.34%	0.52%
Mixed race or Multiracial (NH)	1,265	1,526	3,187	2.41%	2.94%	5.84%
Hispanic or Latino (any race)	2,374	3,521	5,080	4.52%	6.79%	9.31%
Total	52,524	51,878	54,583	100.00%	100.00%	100.00%

=== 2020 census ===
As of the 2020 census, there were 54,583 people in the village. There were 23,915 households and 12,774 families. The population density was 11,613.40 inhabitants per square mile (4,483.96/km^{2}), and there were 25,953 housing units at an average density of 5,521.91 per square mile (2,132.02/km^{2}).

The median age was 39.9 years. 22.8% of residents were under the age of 18 and 16.0% were 65 years of age or older. For every 100 females, there were 88.4 males, and for every 100 females age 18 and over, there were 83.7 males age 18 and over.

100.0% of residents lived in urban areas, while 0.0% lived in rural areas.

Of 23,915 households, 30.0% had children under the age of 18 living in them. Of all households, 43.3% were married-couple households, 17.8% had a male householder with no spouse or partner present, and 33.3% had a female householder with no spouse or partner present. About 36.5% of all households were made up of individuals, and 12.5% had someone living alone who was 65 years of age or older.

Of the village's housing units, 7.9% were vacant. The homeowner vacancy rate was 1.8% and the rental vacancy rate was 9.1%.

=== Income and poverty ===
The median income for a household in the village was $96,945, and the median income for a family was $142,785. Males had a median income of $79,284 versus $54,639 for females. The per capita income for the village was $58,262. About 3.3% of families and 7.0% of the population were below the poverty line, including 3.7% of those under age 18 and 8.7% of those age 65 or over.

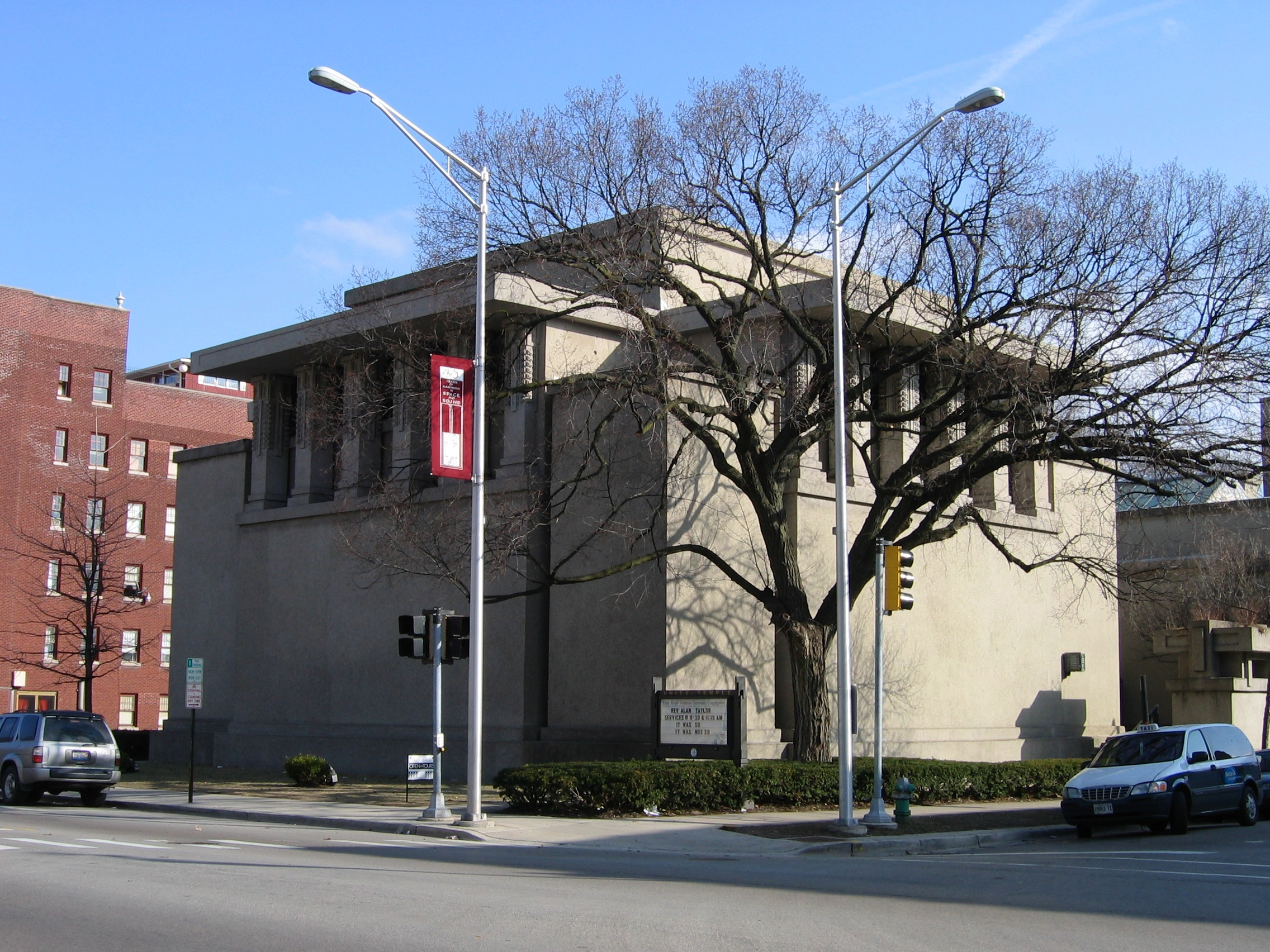
Unity Temple, designed by Frank Lloyd Wright in 1905 and finished in 1908, is part of The 20th-Century Architecture of Frank Lloyd Wright, a World Heritage Site.

Starting in the 1960s, Oak Park residents undertook a concerted effort to avoid the white flight and disinvestment that were occurring on Chicago's West Side. White residents were leaving formerly all-white neighborhoods as Black residents moved in, a process accelerated by racial steering and blockbusting. These practices produced rapid racial change across the West Side, including the Austin neighborhood adjacent to Oak Park. White flight from these neighborhoods was driven largely by racist concerns tied to fears of declining property values and rising crime, and many white-owned businesses departed as well.

The Village of Oak Park passed a fair housing ordinance in 1968 (the same year as the federal Fair Housing Act). In 1972, Roberta "Bobbie" Raymond founded the Oak Park Housing Center to help prevent white flight and promote racial integration. One component of this effort was a ban on "for sale" signs on homes. This policy was later ruled unconstitutional in Linmark Associates, Inc. v. Township of Willingboro (1977), though the use of such signs remains strongly discouraged by local realtors.

A 2003 evaluation of the Oak Park's policies to prevent white flight noted the gradual increase in the share of village population that was Black, at 22% in 2000, and further observed:

As late as 2000, there were no resegregated census tracts, with tracts ranging from 7% black to 36% black ... this was not because the pattern of rapid westward resegregation had run its course, because events in neighboring suburbs showed that segregation trends were still operating. Instead, the pattern in a sense leaped over Oak Park to other suburbs farther west, including Bellwood and Maywood, which resegregated in a relatively short time.

== Arts and culture ==
Oak Park has an active arts community, resulting in part from its favorable location adjacent to Chicago (7 miles (11 km) west of the "Loop") as well as the village's connections to international figures in the visual, literary, and performing arts such as Ernest Hemingway, Frank Lloyd Wright, Betty White, and Tymoteusz Karpowicz. This tradition continues into the present, as Oak Park is home to numerous theater, music, dance, and fine-arts professionals. The arts district on Harrison Street, bounded by Austin Avenue to the east and Ridgeland Avenue to the west, features boutique galleries, shops, and restaurants.

Oak Park is home to several professional dance and theatre companies, including Circle Theatre, Oak Park Festival Theatre, Laurel Theater, and Momenta resident dance company of The Academy of Movement and Music. Oak Park, with neighboring River Forest, also plays host to the Symphony of Oak Park and River Forest, which celebrated its 75th anniversary in 2009.

Oak Park is also home to WEUR, broadcasting from the former Oak Park Arms Hotel at 1490 AM since 1950. Formerly WPNA and run by the Polish National Alliance, the station's programming serves the diverse linguistic and cultural communities in the Chicago metropolitan area (in the late-1960s, WPNA had the only "underground" disc jockey in Chicago, Scorpio). The Oak Park Art League (OPAL), a nonprofit visual arts center founded after World War I (renamed in 1970), provides classes, workshops, lectures, demonstrations, and exhibitions. Since 1921, OPAL has been providing opportunities for arts engagement and cultural enrichment. Over 4,500 artists participate in OPAL's events each year.

Oak Park has been home to numerous festivals and holiday observances. The July 4 celebration featuring fireworks draws thousands to the Oak Park-River Forest High School football stadium. A Day in Our Village, held in June, allows local groups to set up tables to seek members.

The Oak Park, Illinois Film Festival (OPILFF) began in 2024, celebrating films connected to Oak Park by cast, crew, subject, or filming location.

== Government ==
=== Village ===
Since 1951, Oak Park has been organized under the council-manager form of municipal government. The village government includes an elected president and an elected village board, which hires a village manager to conduct the day-to-day affairs of the administration. Oak Park also has five additional governments which levy real estate taxes. These include the Oak Park Township, the high school district (which also levies from adjacent River Forest), the elementary school district, the library district, and the Oak Park Park District.

The United States Postal Service operates the main Oak Park Post Office at 901 Lake Street and the Oak Park South Post Office at 1116 Garfield Street.

=== Elections ===
Oak Park's village board, village president, and other elected officials are elected through a two-stage election process. A primary election is used to nominate party candidates, and a general election is used to elect government officials. Oak Park's election turnout varies greatly depending on whether it is a municipal or national election. In the 2012 presidential election, Oak Park had the highest voter turnout in suburban Cook County; 79.8% of registered voters cast a ballot. Municipal elections for the board of trustees and village clerk generally have much lower voter turnout, averaging around 20% and are held in spring, consistent with state law. The municipal elections are considered nonpartisan, as the national political parties do not put up the candidates. Candidates step forward, or are found by a citizens group that works to find people to have new candidates for each election cycle, encourage participation in local issues.

=== Schools ===
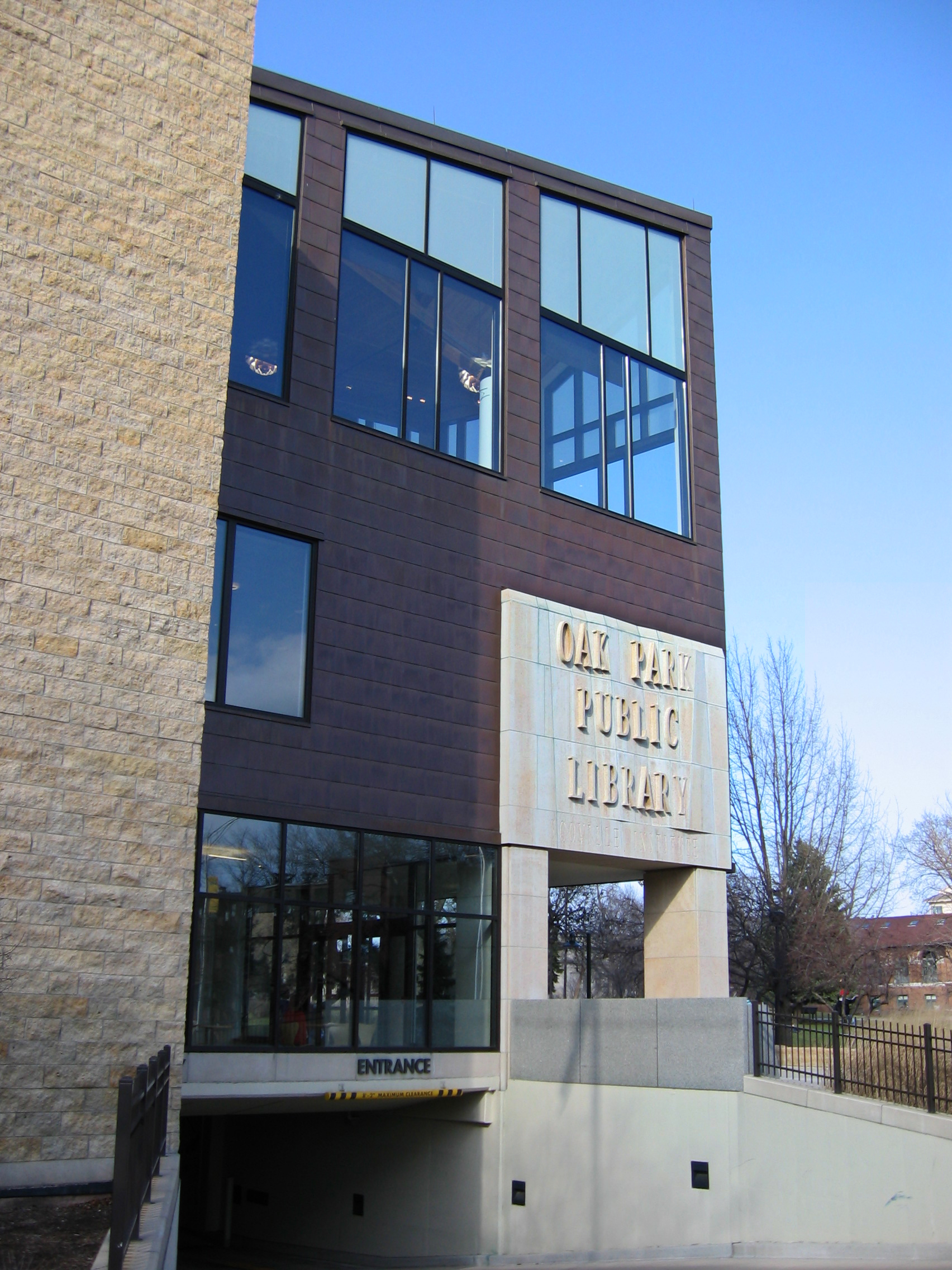
Oak Park Public Library

The public primary schools (Lincoln, Mann, Longfellow, Beye, Irving, Holmes, Whittier, and Hatch) and the middle schools, Percy Julian Middle School (formerly Nathaniel Hawthorne) and Gwendolyn Brooks Middle School (formerly Ralph Waldo Emerson) are operated by Oak Park Elementary School District 97. These ten schools serve the entire city limits. There are also multiple private schools.

Performance ratings for schools in Oak Park (as evaluated by standardized statewide tests) are released periodically, known as the school report cards.

The renaming of the junior high schools, now middle schools, after prominent African-Americans rather than famous American literary figures was done in part to motivate minority students in their educational pursuits. A gap in school performance, referred to as "this intolerable and persistent inequity," remains, as of the date of the report.

Oak Park is the home of two high schools: Oak Park and River Forest High School, the sole school in educational District 200, which also serves the entire city, and Fenwick High School. Oak Park and River Forest High School is a public school with its district including both Oak Park and neighboring River Forest, and Fenwick High School is a Catholic college preparatory school run by the Dominicans, affiliated with the Roman Catholic Archdiocese of Chicago. Both high schools have a long history of high academic standards. Oak Park and River Forest High School bestows the Tradition of Excellence Award to distinguished alumni, including Ernest Hemingway, Ray Kroc, Dan Castellaneta, football Hall-of-Famer George Trafton, actress Mary Elizabeth Mastrantonio, astronomer Chad Trujillo, geochemist Wally Broecker, and environmental leader Phil Radford. Oak Park and River Forest High School is one of seven secondary educational institutions in Illinois with the ability to induct students into the Cum Laude Society.

=== Park District ===
The Park District of Oak Park was first organized in 1912 as the Recreation Department of the Village of Oak Park. Under the direction of Josephine Blackstock and her successor, Lilly Ruth Hanson, it embarked on a vigorous program of recreation for villagers. The playgrounds were named by Blackstock after famous children's writers.

In the late 1980s, the Recreation Department was dissolved, and the Park District of Oak Park was created as a separate tax-levying body. It comprises thirteen parks scattered throughout the village, for a total of 80 acres (320,000 m^{2}) of parkland, a historic house available for functions with payment of fees, the Oak Park Conservatory, and two outdoor pools. The Park District also provides dog exercise areas where dog owners may bring their pets with payment of fees. A second outdoor pool, an official-sized ice rink, a green roof and synthetic-turfed playing fields are at Ridgeland Common at the corner of Lake Street and Ridgeland Avenue, originally built in 1962. It was completely renovated from March 2013 to June 14, 2014.

=== Public library ===
Founded as a public library in 1903, after electing its first board of trustees, the Oak Park Public Library has an history. The library has a main campus overlooking Scoville Park at the corner of Oak Park Avenue and Lake Street, and two branches, the Dole Branch Library (at Dole Community Center) and the Maze Branch Library. As a member of the SWAN library consortium, the Oak Park Public Library offers its cardholders access to nearly 8 million items.

=== Public safety ===
==== Fire ====
Providing fire protection and emergency medical services, the Oak Park Fire Department currently operates from three fire stations, located throughout the village, Fire Station #1 (headquarters), Fire Station #2 (north), and Fire Station #3 (south) under the command of a battalion chief per shift. The Oak Park Fire Department operates three ALS engines, one ALS truck, three ALS ambulances, one ALS paramedic squad, one command unit, and several specialized MABAS divisional apparatus.

Fire station locations and apparatus

Engine company	Truck company	Ambulance	Special unit	Command unit	Address
	Truck 631	Ambulances 612–614	618 (pick-up truck), Squad 611, the MABAS Division 11 T.R.T. Unit and MABAS Division 11 Hazmat Unit 1100	Command Unit 620 (battalion chief)	100 N. Euclid Ave.
Engine 602					212 Augusta St.
Engines 603 and 604			MABAS Division 11 Air Support Unit		900 S. East Ave.

==== Police and crime ====
The Oak Park Police Department employs roughly 118 officers, with 23 sworn officers per 10,000 residents.

In 2019, Oak Park's reported violent crime rate per 100,000 residents was 298, 28% lower than that of Illinois as a whole. The reported property crime rate, at 3,047, was 50% higher. In 2020 the village experienced a ten percent increase in reported crimes, including more thefts, robberies, and aggravated assaults/batteries, but fewer burglaries, compared to 2019.

== Transportation ==
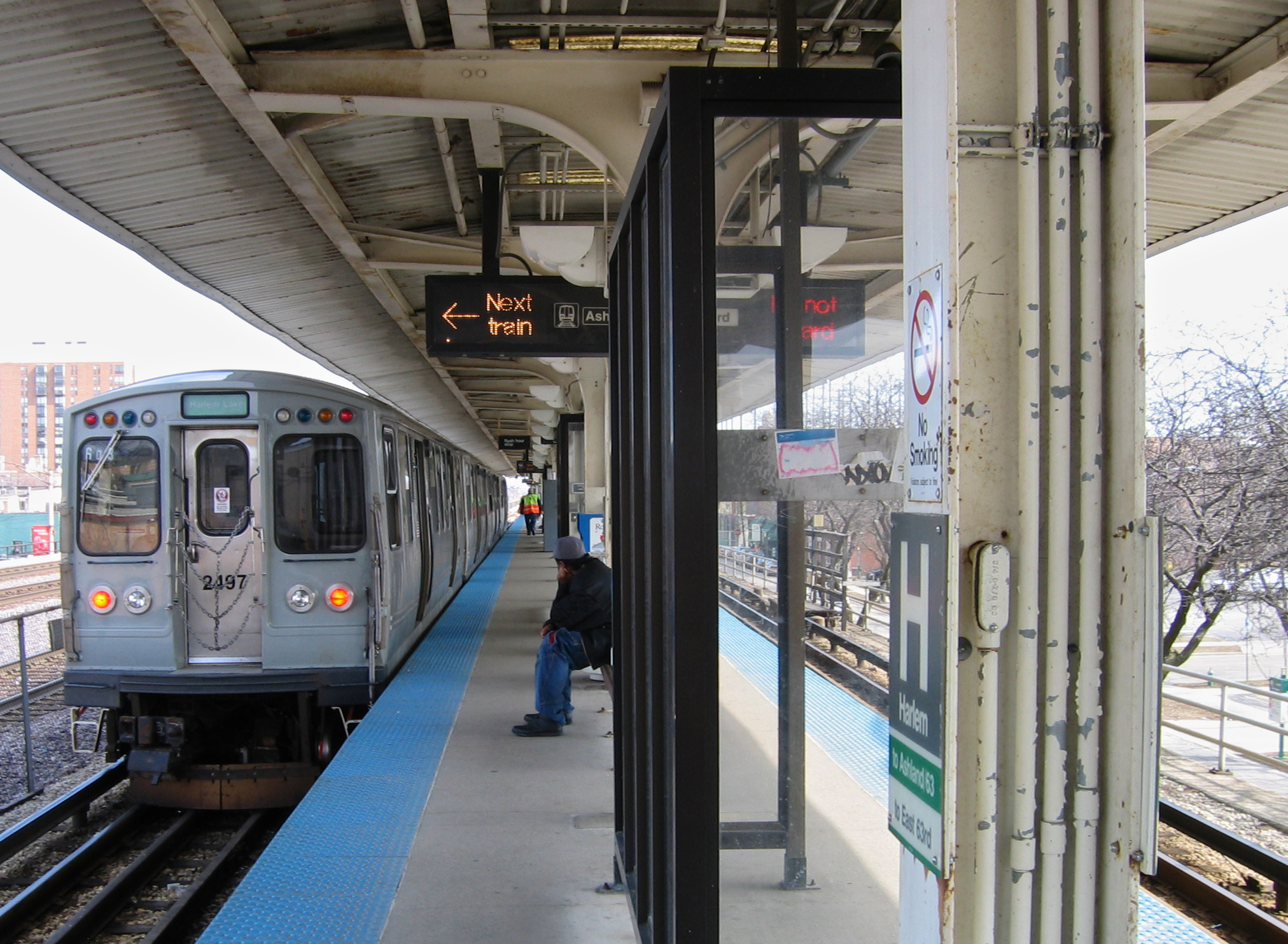
Harlem/Lake station on the Chicago 'L' Green Line

=== Public transit ===
Oak Park is accessible from Chicago by service on the Green Line and the Blue Line at five CTA stations in Oak Park. Oak Park also has a station for Metra's Union Pacific West Line. Bus transit service within Oak Park and to other suburbs is also provided by the CTA and Pace.

=== Streets, addresses, and expressways ===
The Eisenhower Expressway is the primary expressway between Chicago and Oak Park. The highway also provides connections to O'Hare International Airport. Major east–west streets in Oak Park continue east into Chicago.

The streets are laid out in a grid pattern, occasionally with local streets ending in a cul-de-sac to maintain local character. Oak Park has its own street-numbering system that begins, for east–west streets, at Austin Boulevard (no east or west designation), and for north–south streets, at the elevated train tracks located just south of Lake Street, which divides the numbers, getting larger going north or south from there, and requiring north or south designation on addresses. The border streets do not follow the Oak Park numbering system; rather, they match the address system with the cities sharing those border streets. For example, addresses on Austin Boulevard match the Chicago system, with the zero line at Madison Street, and along North Avenue, addresses match the Chicago system, with Austin Boulevard at 6000 W and Harlem at 7200 W. Additionally, Elizabeth Court, located within the Frank Lloyd Wright Historic District, maintains its original numbering. The houses on that cul-de-sac start at 1 and go up to 12.

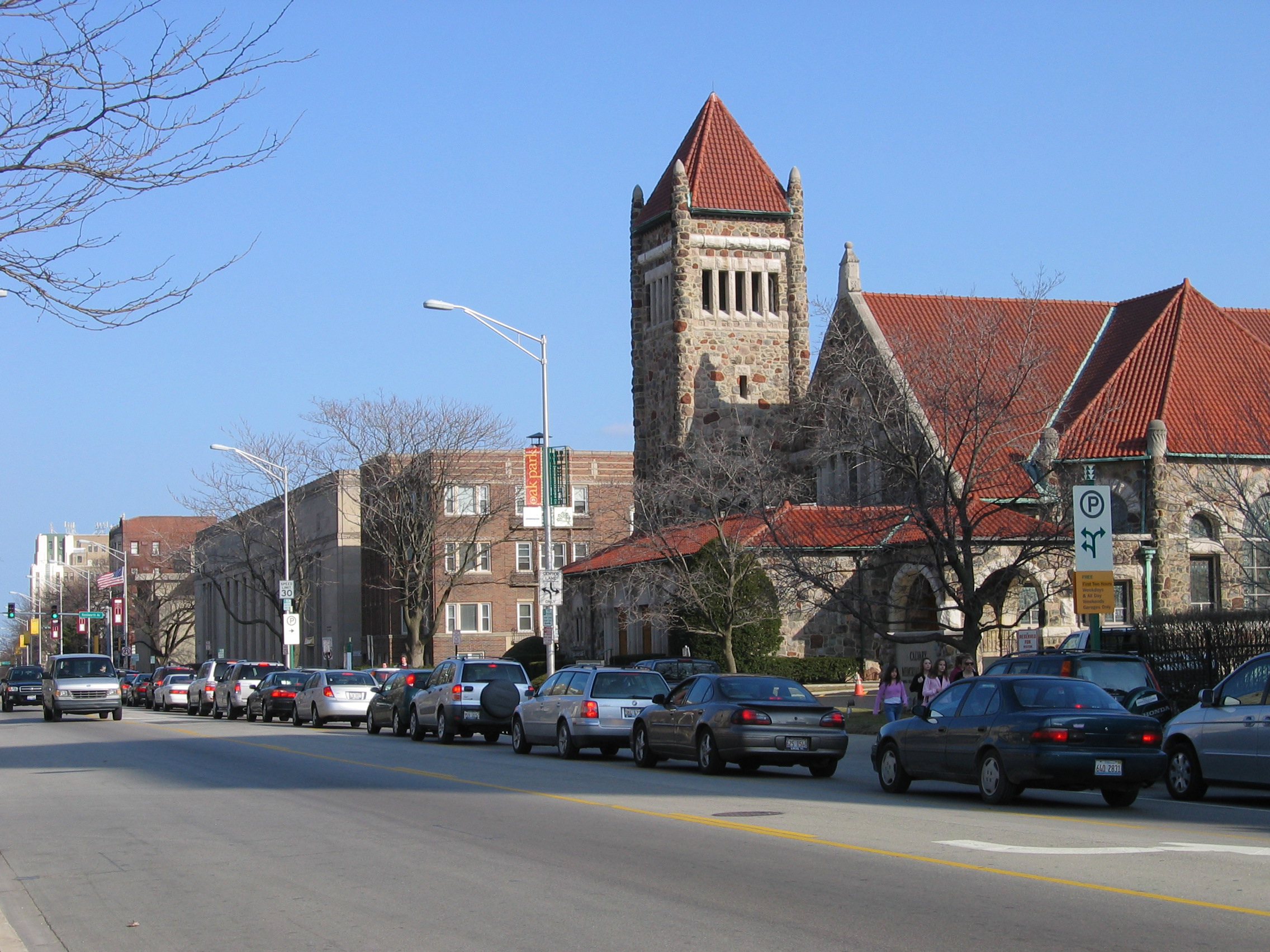
931 Lake Street looking eastward. Calvary Memorial Church is featured on the right.

=== Bicycles ===
Augusta Boulevard through the village is part of the Grand Illinois Trail; the trailhead of the Illinois Prairie Path is less than 1-mile (1.6 km) from Oak Park. With several cycle clubs and groups, Oak Park is considered a bicycle-friendly community, and the tree-lined streets of the community, as well as its proximity to trails in nearby communities, attract cyclists to Oak Park, easily accessed by the Green Line, Blue Line, or Metra. Bicycle lanes are marked on many streets throughout Oak Park, although not many segregated cycle facilities have been put in place.

Divvy bike sharing, which serves the city of Chicago, came to Oak Park in 2016. Oak Park's Village Board cancelled the Divvy program in 2017, after the program was determined not to be cost-effective.
