= Oscar B. Balch House =

Historic house in Oak Park, Illinois

- U.S. Historic district – Contributing property
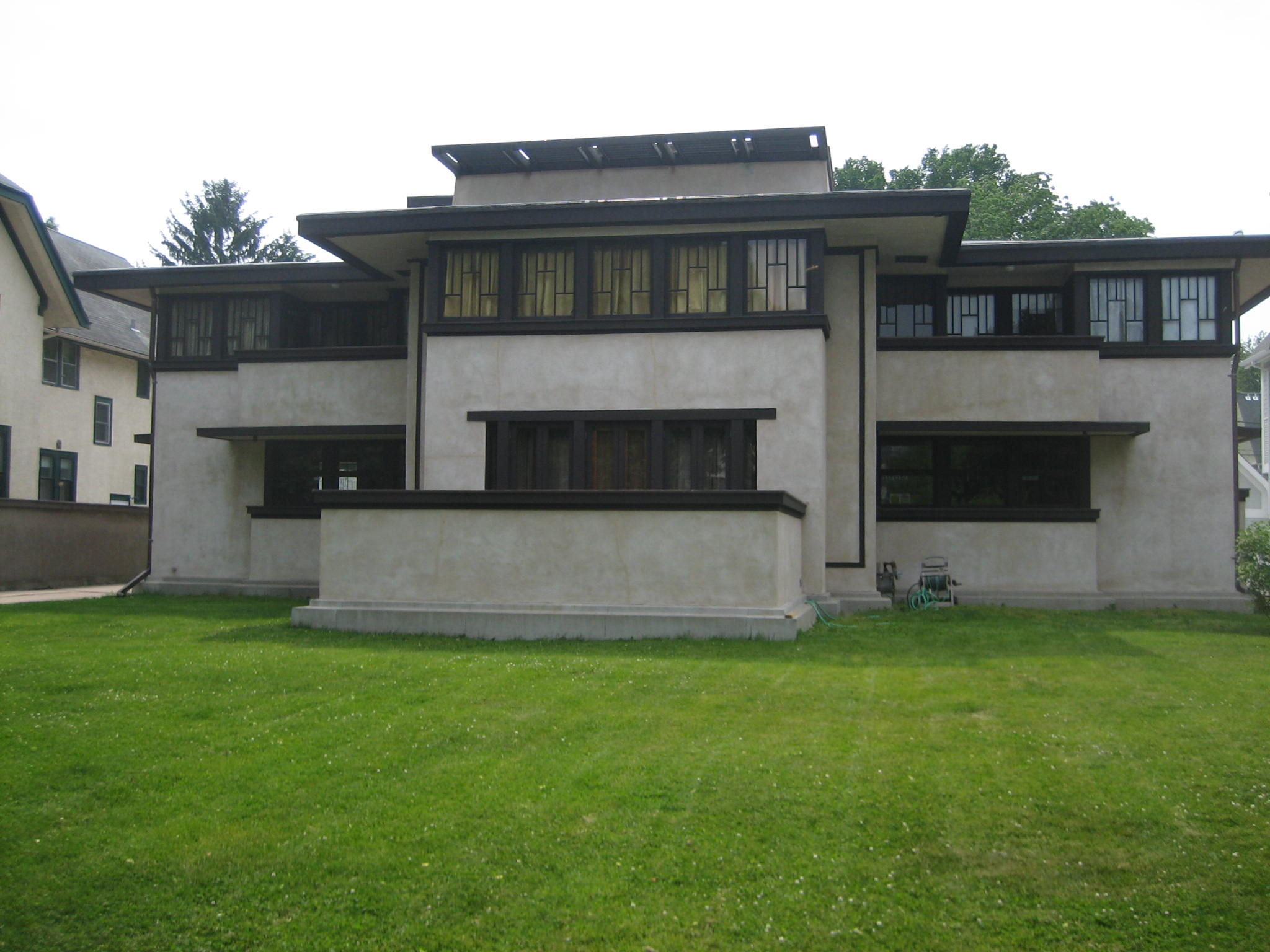

- Location within Illinois Location within the United States
- Interactive map showing the location of Balch House
- Location: 611 N. Kenilworth Ave., Oak Park, Cook County, Illinois, U.S.
- Nearest city: Chicago, Illinois
- Coordinates: 41°53′47″N 87°47′53″W
- Built: 1911
- Architect: Frank Lloyd Wright
- Architectural style: Prairie style
- Part of: Frank Lloyd Wright-Prairie School of Architecture Historic District (ID73000699)
- Added to NRHP: December 4, 1973

The Oscar B. Balch House is a home at 611 N. Kenilworth Avenue in Oak Park, a suburb of Chicago, Illinois, United States. The Prairie style Balch House was designed by famous architect Frank Lloyd Wright in 1911. The home was the first house Wright designed after returning from a trip to Europe with a client's wife. The subsequent social exile cost the architect friends, clients, and his family. The house is one of the first Wright houses to employ a flat roof which gives the home a horizontal linearity. Historian Thomas O'Gorman noted that the home may provide a glimpse into the subconscious mind of Wright. The Balch house is listed as a contributing property to the Frank Lloyd Wright-Prairie School of Architecture Historic District, a U.S. federally Registered Historic District.

== History ==
The Oscar Balch House was one of the first homes designed by architect Frank Lloyd Wright upon his return from an extended trip to Europe, during which he designed no houses. Wright had traveled to Europe with Mamah Borthwick, a client's wife. This flouting of public morality lost him friends, clients and his family. Amongst those who by contrast stood by Wright was the interior decorator Oscar Balch. Balch was one of two partners in the decorating firm Pebbles & Balch. In 1907, Wright created a building redesign for Balch's storefront on Lake Street in Oak Park; the building was later razed.

Tim Pearson, the home's owner at the time, renovated the house between 1999 and 2016. The house was subsequently placed on sale in March 2016 for $1.25 million, and Samantha Lotti acquired the Balch House that year for $1.126 million. The firm of Tom Bassett-Dilley Architects was hired to reduce the house's carbon footprint to net zero. This work included replacing the roof with an airtight membrane, insulating the windows and second-floor ceiling, restoring the ceiling, and adding a geothermal heating system. By 2024, Lotti had spent $800,000 renovating the house, excluding the cost of solar panels, which she planned to install at a later date. Lotti placed the house for sale at $1.5 million that September, signing a contract with a buyer the same month.

== Architecture ==
The Balch House is one of Wright's first flat-roofed houses and its proportions are taller compared with later flat-roofed homes he designed. Wright brought new drama to his Prairie style with the addition of the flat roof. The expansive roof further refined the simplicity of Wright's Prairie style house. The house has broad, overhanging eaves, common to Prairie houses and in the case of the Balch House they further emphasize the Prairie theme. The exterior is sheathed in stucco which provides a sculpting effect on the exterior. The original color of the stucco on the exterior is unknown but photographs show that the house has undergone color changes.

The design of the house is symbolic in its heightened terrace walls, the security walls and its hidden and obscured entryway. The house clearly shows the signs of someone who feels trapped or "under siege." The events of Wright's personal life may be reflected in the design of the Balch House. Regardless, the house has a remarkable linear proportion and Wright managed to raise the eyeline with the rows of windows on the home's second floor. The home is part of a series of geometric, cubic homes with overhanging, flat roofs designed by Wright in the early 20th century. The first was the Laura Gale House in Oak Park, Illinois, followed by the Oscar B. Balch House, also in Oak Park, Coonley Kindergarten, the Bogh House and then the Bach House.

The first floor plan is similar to the Edwin H. Cheney House; both have a three part first floor layout that includes a library, a dining room and a living room. The interior spaces are separated by "low decks set at the window heads." In the living room the house is anchored by a Roman brick fireplace at its center and there are libraries on either side of two small setback pavilions. These features help the building's interior flow and symmetry. Copious use of glass brings natural light into the interior.

== Significance ==
The Oscar Balch House represents Frank Lloyd Wright's defiant return to the streets of Oak Park and to architecture after his absence and concurrent trip to Europe with Mamah Borthwick Cheney. The house was called "forged of Wright's personal courage and cheeky moral humbridge" by historian Thomas O'Gorman. O'Gorman concluded it was possible that the Balch House provides a rare glimpse into the subconscious mind of Frank Lloyd Wright. The Balch House is an example of Frank Lloyd Wright's fully mature Prairie style. Its flat roof and horizontal linearity are a continuation of the ideas Wright began to manifest in the Mrs. Thomas H. Gale House in 1909.

The Oscar B. Balch House is listed as a contributing property to the Frank Lloyd Wright-Prairie School of Architecture Historic District. The historic district was added to the U.S. National Register of Historic Places on December 4, 1973. The Balch House stands across the street from the home where Ernest Hemingway spent his boyhood years.

== See also ==
- List of Frank Lloyd Wright works
- Edwin Cheney
