= Emil Bach House =

Historic house in Chicago, Illinois

- U.S. National Register of Historic Places
- Chicago Landmark
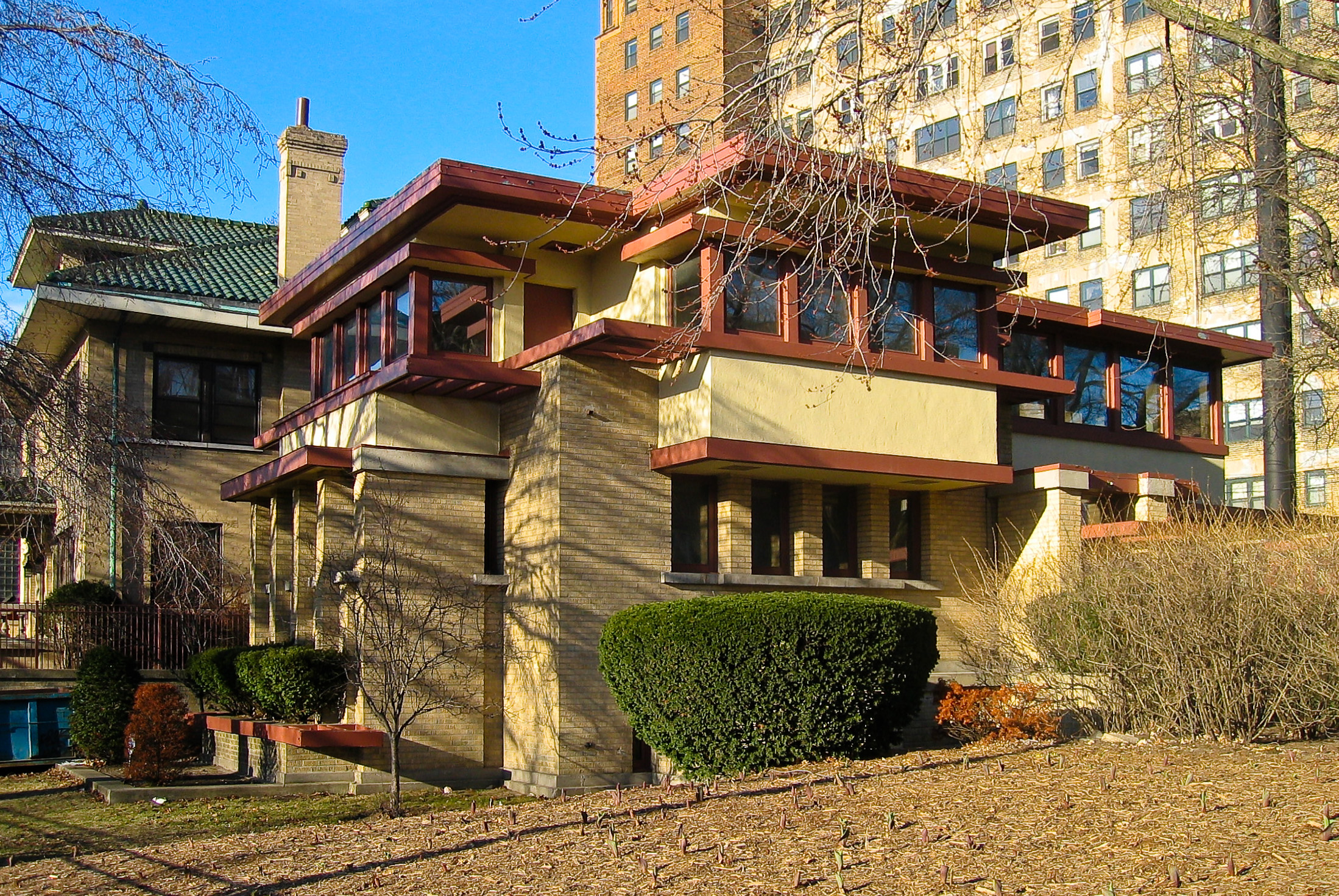

- Location within Chicago metropolitan area Location within Illinois Location within the United States
- Interactive map showing the location of the Emil Bach House
- Location: 7415 N. Sheridan Road; Chicago, Illinois
- Coordinates: 42°00′59.7″N 87°39′53.6″W
- Area: less than one acre
- Built: 1915
- Architect: Frank Lloyd Wright
- Architectural style: Prairie style
- NRHP reference No.: 79000821

Significant dates
- Added to NRHP: January 23, 1979
- Designated CHICL: September 28, 1977

The Emil Bach House is a Prairie style house at 7415 North Sheridan Road in the Rogers Park neighborhood of Chicago, Illinois, United States. Designed by the architect Frank Lloyd Wright, the house was built for Emil Bach, a German immigrant who had cofounded the Bach Brick Company. The house is an example of Wright's late Prairie style work, just before he began to design Usonian buildings. The Bach House is a Chicago Landmark and is listed on the National Register of Historic Places.

Bach commissioned Wright to design the house in 1915 and owned the house until 1931, when he sold the property to Joseph Peacock. The house was resold several more times through the 20th century, remaining a private residence during that time. In 2005, Jane Elizabeth Ferrer bought the Bach House at an auction after several attempts to sell the building had failed. Jennifer Pritzker bought the house in 2010 and renovated it, opening it to the public for tours, events, and overnight stays in 2014. Pritzker donated the house to Loyola University Chicago in 2025.

The Bach House was designed as a two-story single family residence with a basement. The general plan is based on Wright's "Fireproof House for $5000" design, which was published in the Ladies' Home Journal in 1907; the first story has a rectangular floor plan, while the second story is cruciform in arrangement. Though the house is on the eastern side of Sheridan Road, the entrance is from the rear, facing Lake Michigan. The rooms on the first floor (including a living room, dining area, and kitchen) surround a fireplace. The second floor includes either three or four bedrooms, as well as two bathrooms. The design has received praise from architectural critics such as Paul Gapp and Blair Kamin.

== Site ==
The Bach House is at 7415 North Sheridan Road in the Rogers Park community area of Chicago in Illinois, United States. The house is one block west of Lake Michigan. When the house was constructed, it was a "country home" with a clear view of Lake Michigan from its rear (east) facade. As a result of the changing nature of the Rogers Park neighborhood, the house now stands among commercial structures and apartment buildings. The house occupies a lot measuring 60 by 150 feet (18 by 46 m).

== History ==
=== 20th century ===
The house's original owner was Emil Bach, a German immigrant who cofounded the Bach Brick Company with his brothers. By the 1910s, the company was somewhat prosperous, producing 200,000 bricks every eight hours. On December 5, 1914, Emil Bach and his wife Anna purchased the site of the Bach House from Amelia Ludwick and her husband. Bach commissioned the architect Frank Lloyd Wright to design a house for him in Rogers Park, Chicago. Bach was reportedly impressed with Wright's work, and Bach's brother Otto had recently bought another house from the architect.

Through the 20th century, the house was sold multiple times, remaining a private residence. Joseph Peacock purchased the house from the Bachs in 1934 and owned it until 1947. The property changed ownership twice in 1951. The second owner retained the property for eight years, after which Joseph Blinder bought it in 1959. The Blinders resold the house to Frank L. Miller Sr. on the condition that Miller take care of the house. By the 1970s, Miller wished to resell the property, saying that the house was too large for him and his son, Frank L. Miller Jr. Since many buildings in Rogers Park were being redeveloped at the time, Miller wanted the buyer to preserve it. Miller also wanted the house to be designated as a Chicago landmark, unusually for property owners in Chicago, who generally resisted landmark designations. Over the years, several of the original architectural features had been removed, including benches and a dining table.

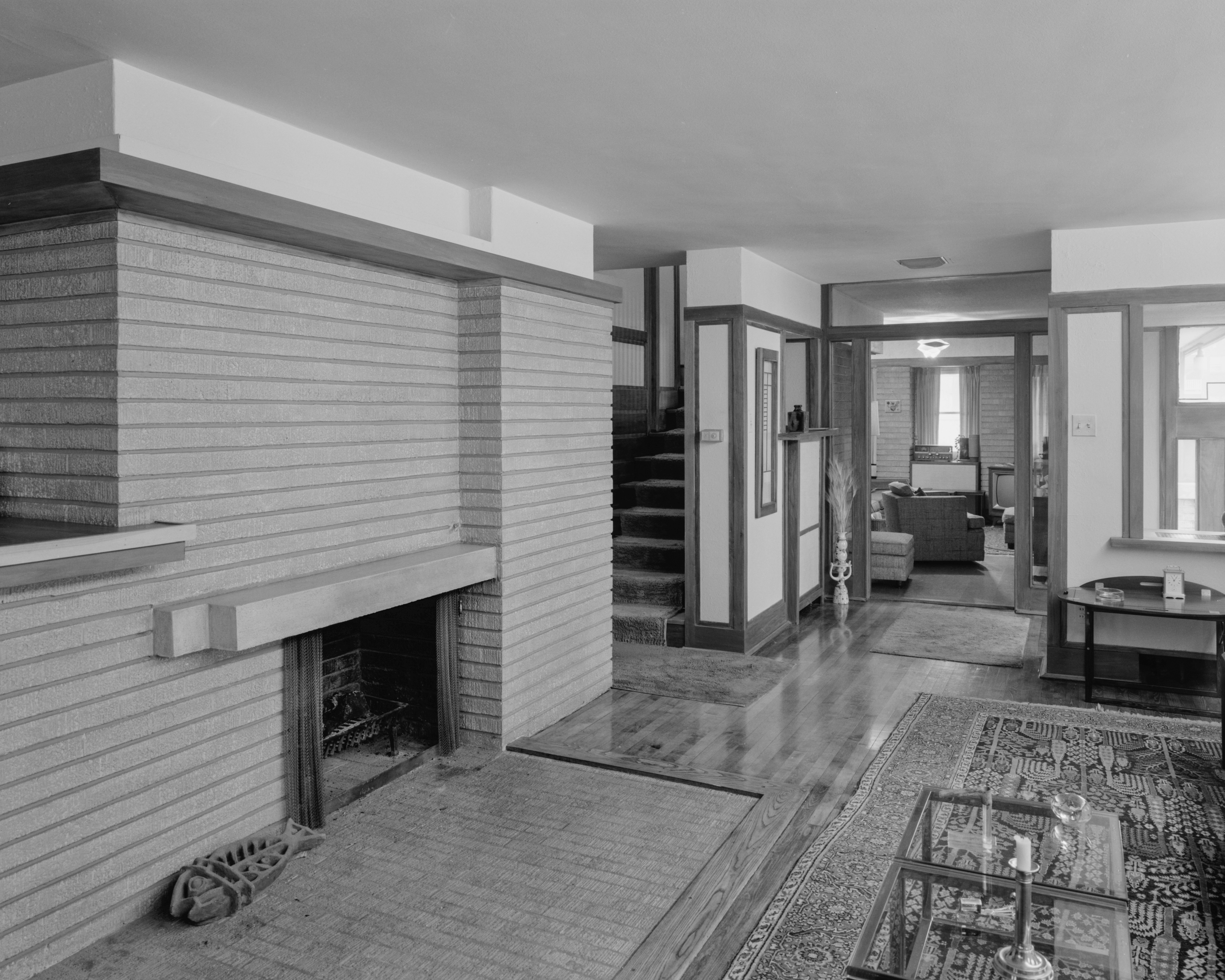
Eastward view from the living room in July 1967

Fedor Banuchi of Wilmette, Illinois, bought the house in 1977 for $130,000, although he continued to live in Wilmette. Banuchi renovated the house extensively and gave the house's windows to the Art Institute of Chicago. He also allowed four students from the University of Oxford to stay there in 1988; the students were conducting a study of the building since, at the time, relatively little was known about its design. In 1998, the building was listed for sale with an asking price of $800,000. It was ultimately sold in 2000 for $437,000. The new owner, an unidentified local restaurateur, also paid $240,000 for an adjacent vacant lot, which measured 45 by 150 feet (14 by 46 m). The LaSalle Bank National Association is recorded as having officially acquired the building from the Banuchi family.

=== Auction and Feerer ownership ===
In 2004, the home was placed for sale with an asking price of $2.5 million. After no one expressed interest in the house, the asking price was reduced to $1.9 million. At the time, the building's landmark designation prevented owners from making significant alterations without prior approval. The surrounding area had changed from a quiet lakefront to a busy neighborhood. Furthermore, the house was relatively small compared to residences designed by other architects. Preservationists expressed concern that the zoning would allow bidders to develop high rise apartments or condominiums on the yard. The owner decided to auction the Bach House as a last resort, after other attempts to sell the house had failed. The owner began soliciting bids in February 2005; the starting price of $750,000 was less than a third of the original asking price. Two hundred people expressed interest in the house.

When bids were opened in March 2005, the house was sold within eight minutes. The buyer planned to move into the house and retain the vacant lot as a yard. The sale price was initially reported at $1.2 million, and records show that that Jane Elizabeth Feerer bought the home. Ferrer ultimately paid $1.17 million, obtaining a loan from the billionaire Jennifer Pritzker to pay for the house.

=== Pritzker ownership and donation to Loyola ===
Pritzker bought the house for $1.7 million in 2010 through her firm Tawani Enterprises. Tawani first restored the interior to its original appearance. The restoration was so precise that workers had to review several paint samples to approximate the original paint colors. Workers obtained a paint sample from the historian Tim Samuelson, who, as a teenager, had taken a piece of the house's original plaster with the owner's permission. Pritzker announced in December 2011 that she would renovate the facade and open the building to the public. The restoration firm Harboe Architects, which had helped restore other Wright–designed structures, was hired to renovate the exterior. Harboe restored the original color scheme, installed replicas of the original windows, and demolished a room that had not been part of the original plans. Tours of the house were hosted during the renovation. Planters and flower beds were added to the yards to approximate the yards' original appearance.

Following an extensive restoration, the house was opened to the public in May 2014. The same year, the Commission on Chicago Landmarks gave the house a Preservation Excellence Award for the renovation. The Frank Lloyd Wright Trust hosted tours each Wednesday for five months a year. The house was rented out for events and overnight stays; the interior could accommodate 120 people for events such as weddings, while the yard could accommodate 25 people. Up to five or six people were allowed to sleep there overnight, except on Wednesdays when tours were hosted. Crain's Chicago Business wrote that the house attracted occupants because of the beaches and commercial districts nearby. The house had no gift shop, but the living room included a stack of commemorative postcards; a coffee table book about the house was also published in 2019.

Virtual tours of the house were hosted in 2020 during the COVID-19 pandemic in Illinois, and the house reopened in 2021 for in-person guided tours. By 2023, Pritzker planned to resell the property, and Tawani stopped renting the house out that December. Pritzker donated the Bach House—along with the adjacent Lang House, designed by Edgar M. Newman—to Loyola University Chicago in early 2025. (Note: The Cook County Clerk's office records the transfer to Loyola as having occurred in January 2025. Loyola's acquisition was not formally reported in the news media until the beginning of February.) The gift also included $1 million for the two houses' upkeep. Loyola announced plans to use the Bach and Lang houses for events, and it opened the house to visitors that October as part of Open House Chicago.

== Architecture ==
The Bach House is one of 11 houses designed by Wright in Chicago and one of his only remaining residential commissions on the North Side of Chicago. The home is one of several homes that Wright designed with cantilevered flat roofs and cubical massings. It is also one of his later Prairie style works, as he transitioned to Usonian and Japanese–influenced designs not long afterward. The Bach House is one of a few Prairie style buildings that he designed in a city; most of his buildings in that style were built instead in Oak Park, a suburb of Chicago.

=== Exterior ===
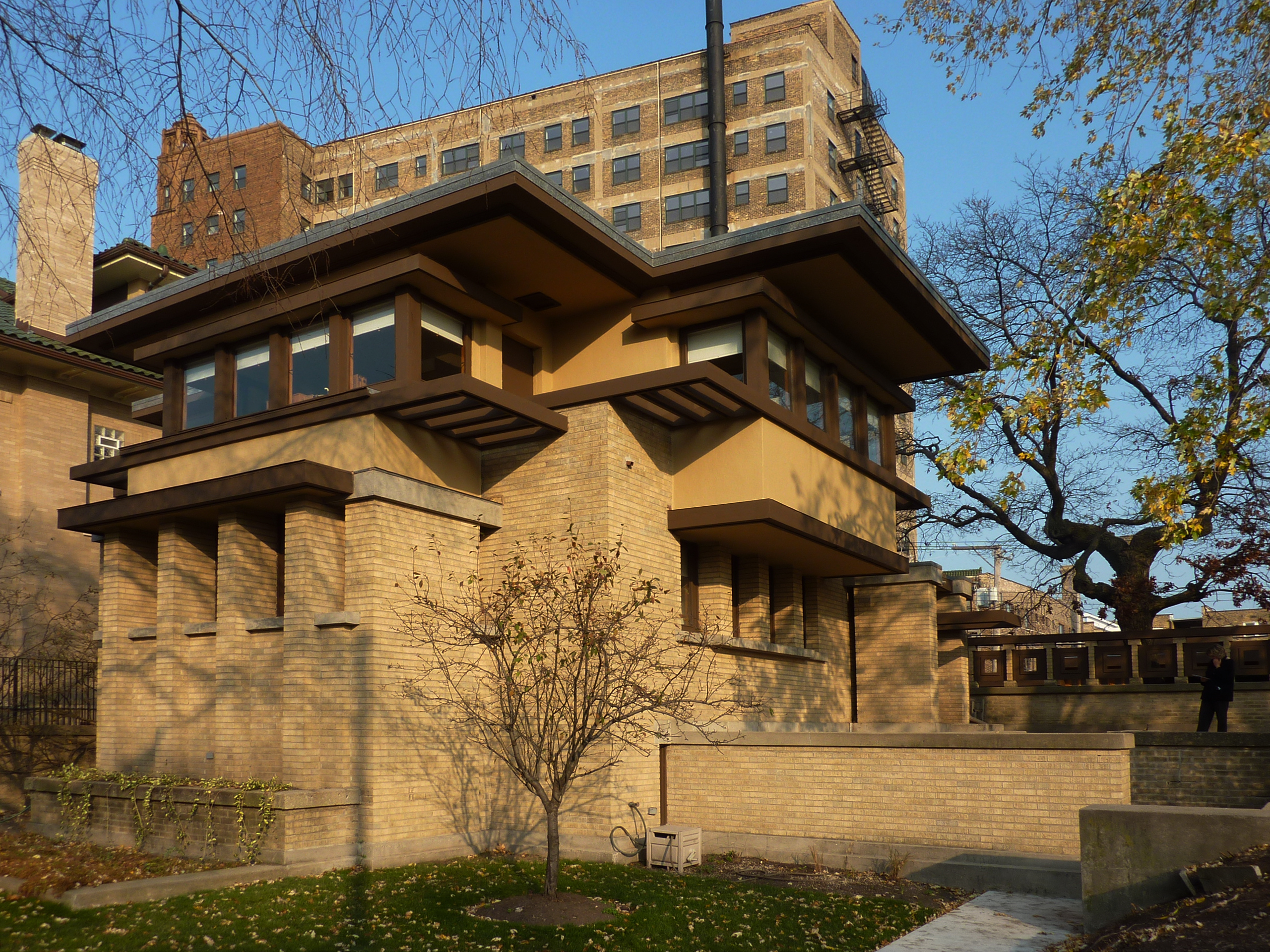
The Bach House in November 2009

The house was designed as a single-family residence, with a basement and two above-ground stories. The building measures approximately 41 by 52 feet (12 by 16 m) across at ground level. The house's massing, or shape, consists of a rectangular first floor and a cruciform second floor. The first floor is clad with tawny brick. To prevent passersby from looking in, the corners of the first floor lack windows, and the windows on that story are recessed between deep vertical piers. By contrast, the second floor has windows on all four sides, and the facade on that story is made of wood and cream-colored stucco. Each wing of the second floor is cantilevered outward, protruding above the first floor. The casement windows are topped by large protruding eaves to give occupants privacy. The roof above the second floor is cantilevered outward from the facade.

Though it is on the east side of Sheridan Road, the main entrance is through the rear, on the eastern elevation of the facade. The entrance is accessed by a winding pathway, located to the right (or south) of the house's primary elevation. The winding path has been described as a "path of discovery", as visitors must turn five or eight times before reaching the entrance. There is a porch on the first floor's rear or eastern elevation, which faces the lake and protrudes from the rectangle. Above it is the "sun deck", a balcony on the second floor. The living room, on the western elevation, also protrudes from the house. After other buildings were erected to the east, glass enclosures were built on the porch and sun deck, bringing both of these spaces indoors. There is also a teahouse in the yard next to the house.

=== Interior ===
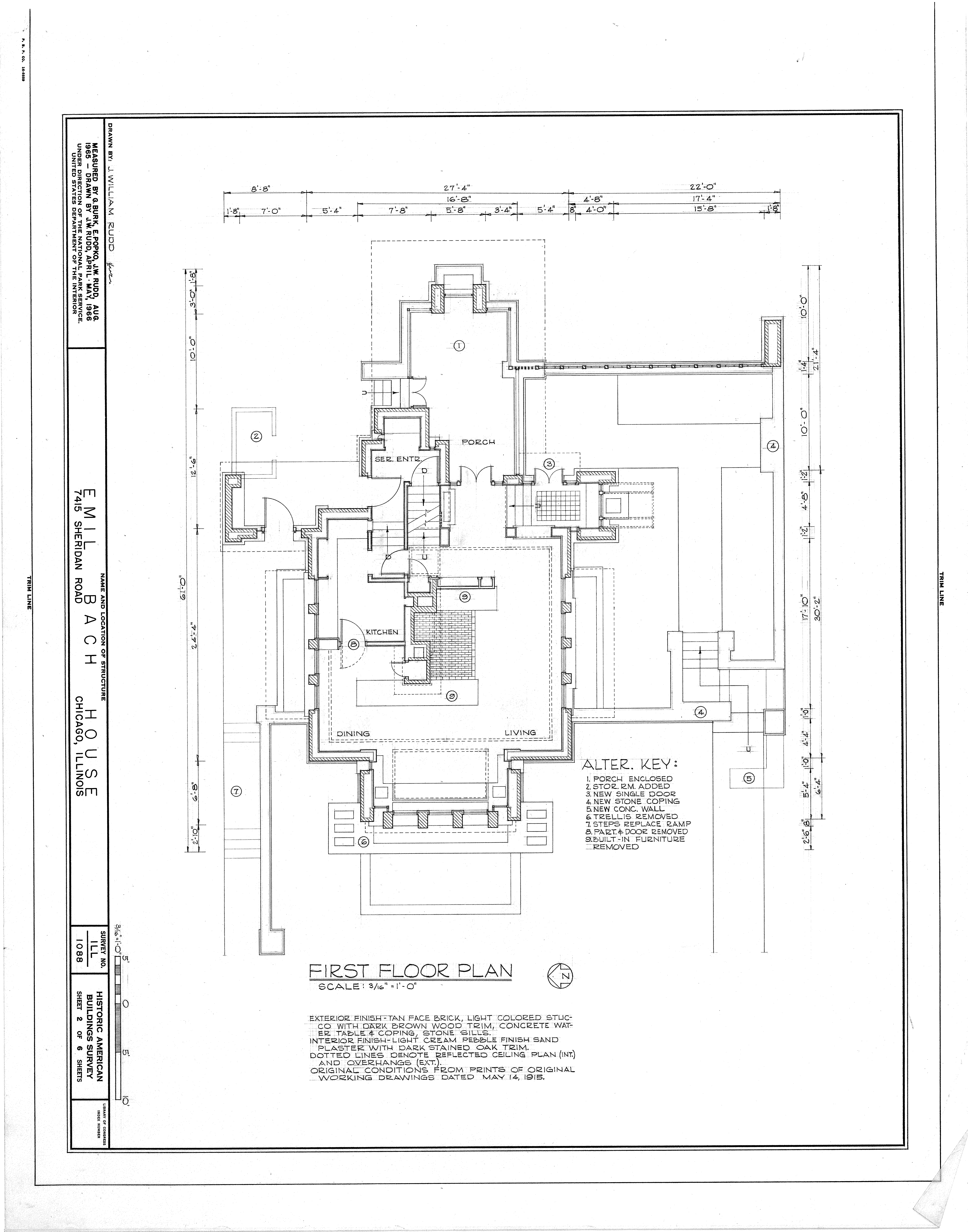
Floor plan of the first story

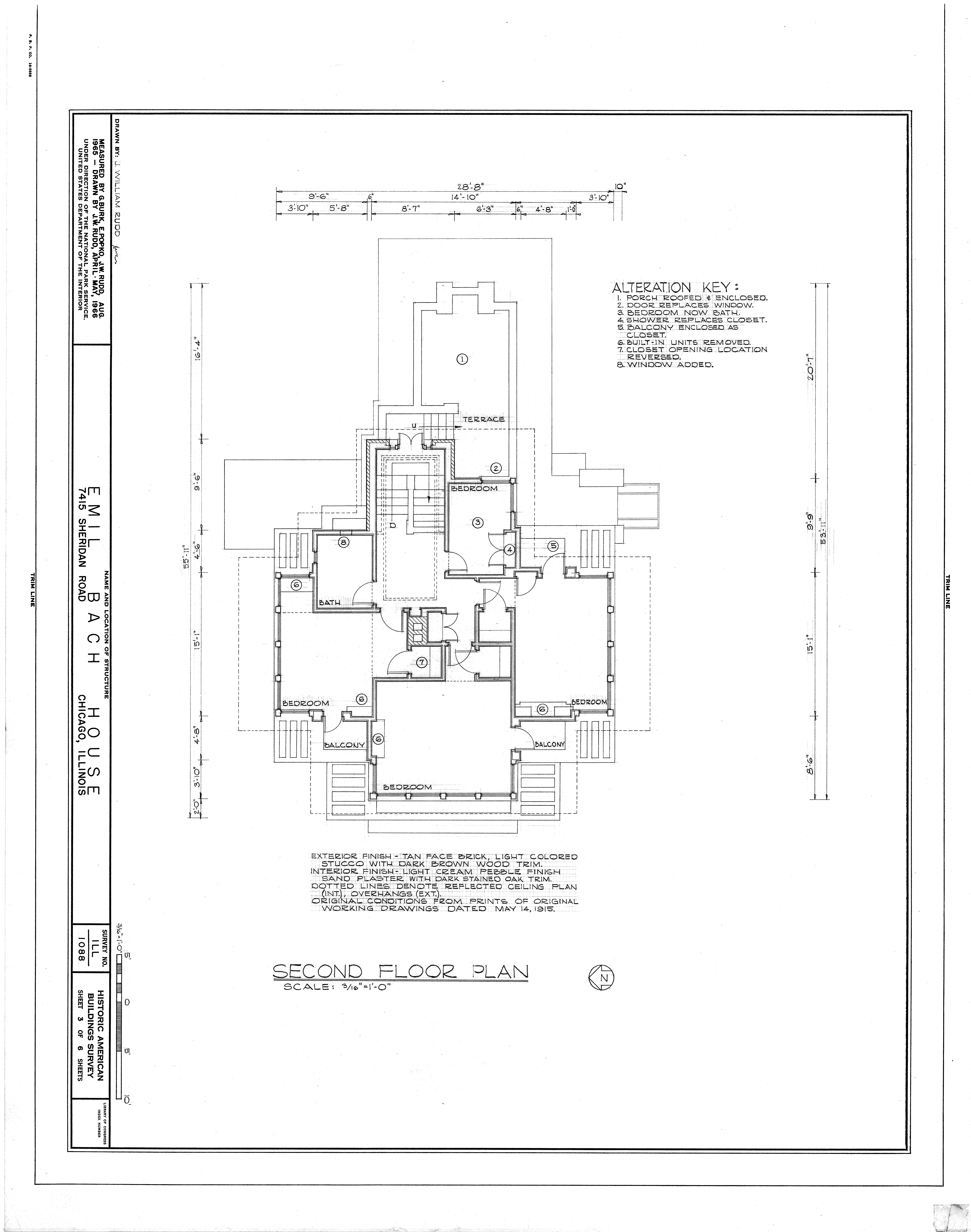
Floor plan of the second story

The building's interior is variously cited as spanning 2,700 square feet (250 m^{2}) or 2,950 square feet (274 m^{2}). The Bach House includes walnut decorations, even though it was built during World War I, when the United States Army managed the nation's supply of walnut. All of the walnut was sourced from a single tree. The walls have a light-colored sand-plaster finish. Wright decorated the rooms in what he described as a "sunshine" yellow color palette. Since the 2010s, the house has included reproductions of its original furniture, which were created by Morgante Wilson, a firm from Evanston. The general plan is based on Wright's "Fireproof House for $5000" design, which was published in the Ladies' Home Journal in 1907. Variants of the layout had previously been used in the Laura Gale House, the Oscar Balch House, the Coonley Kindergarten, and the Frederick C. Bogk House. The first floor is nearly square in plan; the porch and sun deck are the only deviations from the design. In contrast to modern houses with large kitchens and bedrooms, the house has a small kitchen and a large living room and dining room.

Like in many of Wright's other designs, the rooms on the first floor surround a fireplace. The front door ascends to a hallway that continues straight into the kitchen. Behind a partition in the hallway is a set of steep, wood-trimmed stairs, which ascend to the second stair. The living room is to the left of the hallway. An asymmetrical fireplace protrudes into the middle of the living room and includes some shelves and cabinets. There is a dining area at the western end of the living room. The dining room, which can be used as a lounging area, also has a long counter. The living room and dining room, together, occupy three of the house's four corners, with the kitchen occupying the fourth corner.

The top of the staircase is illuminated by glass doors and by lamps designed by Wright. On the second floor, there are either three or four bedrooms. Each of the bedrooms occupies its own wing and has a separate outdoor terrace. The bedrooms have dark wood trim and sparse furniture, Much of the bedrooms' furniture, aside from the beds, was intended to be located in a particular part of the room. At some point in the 20th century, a bathroom replaced the original servant's room. By the 2010s, the house had two primary bedrooms, in addition to a trundle bed in a study.

== Impact ==
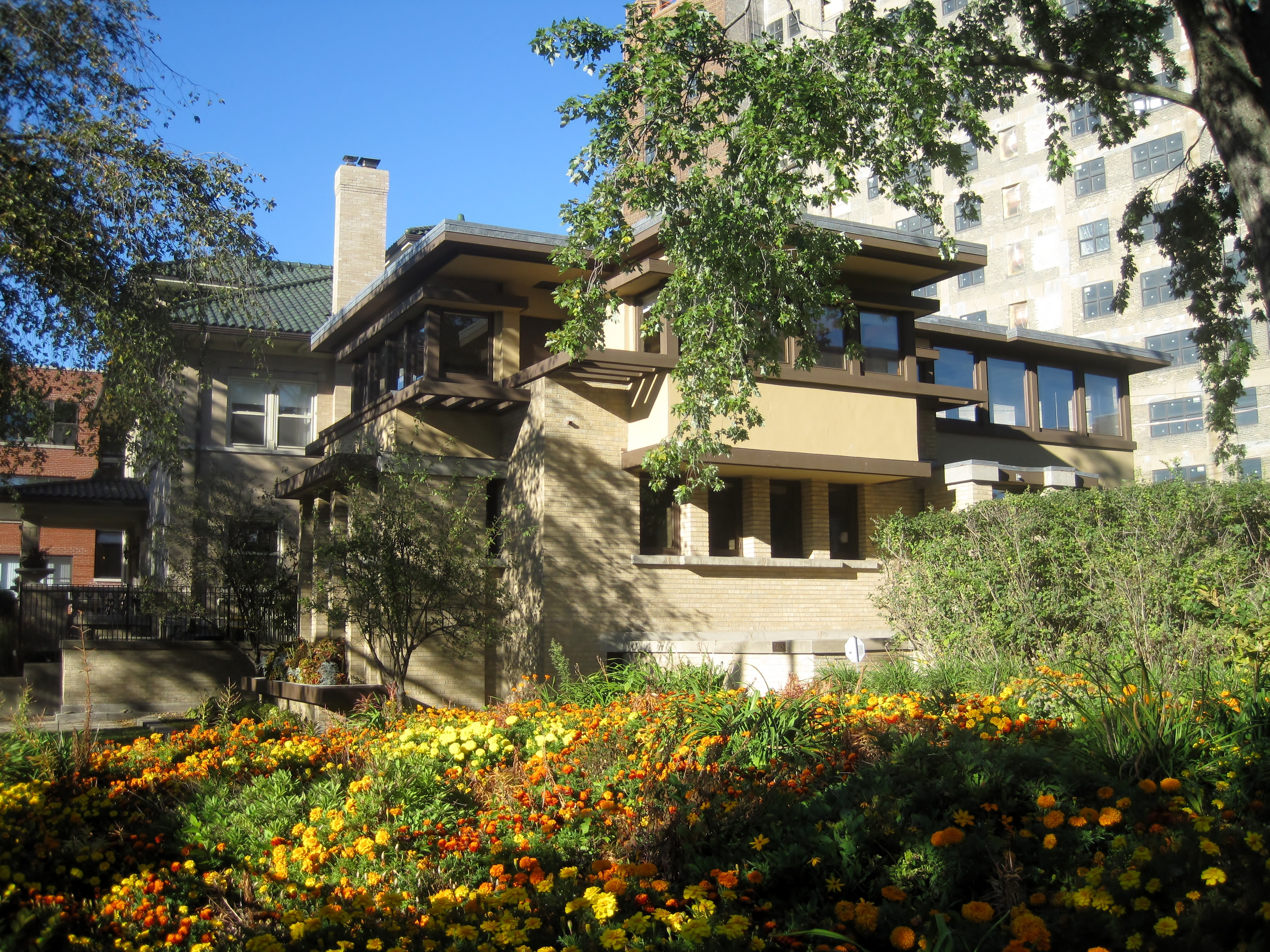
View of the house's exterior

In 1978, the critic Paul Gapp wrote that the Bach House was "a very nice performance, even if it lacks some of the grace of Wright's more sprawling residences". The historian Thomas J. O'Gorman wrote in 2004 that Wright had "destroyed the box, the shape to which most architecture was constructed", in designing the Bach House. After the house was restored, Blair Kamin wrote in 2014 that "the small house packs more creativity than a 10,000 square feet [1,000 m^{2}] McMansion".

The city government declared the structure a Chicago Landmark on September 28, 1977, and it was added to the National Register of Historic Places on January 23, 1979. The Landmarks Preservation Council of Illinois subsequently obtained an easement on the site, which mandated the historic preservation of the house. According to Ronald Scherubel, the executive director of the Frank Lloyd Wright Building Conservancy, the easement has likely been the only thing that has prevented demolition of the Bach House, since many of the buildings surrounding it have been demolished over the years. The easement prohibits the destruction or alteration of the house without approval from the government of Chicago and the Landmarks Preservation Council of Illinois. Since 2018, the Emil Bach House has been part of the Frank Lloyd Wright Trail, a collection of 13 buildings designed by Wright in Illinois.

== See also ==
- List of Frank Lloyd Wright works
- List of Chicago Landmarks
- National Register of Historic Places listings in North Side Chicago
