= George Furbeck House =

Historic house in Oak Park, Illinois

- George W. Furbeck House
- U.S. Historic district – Contributing property
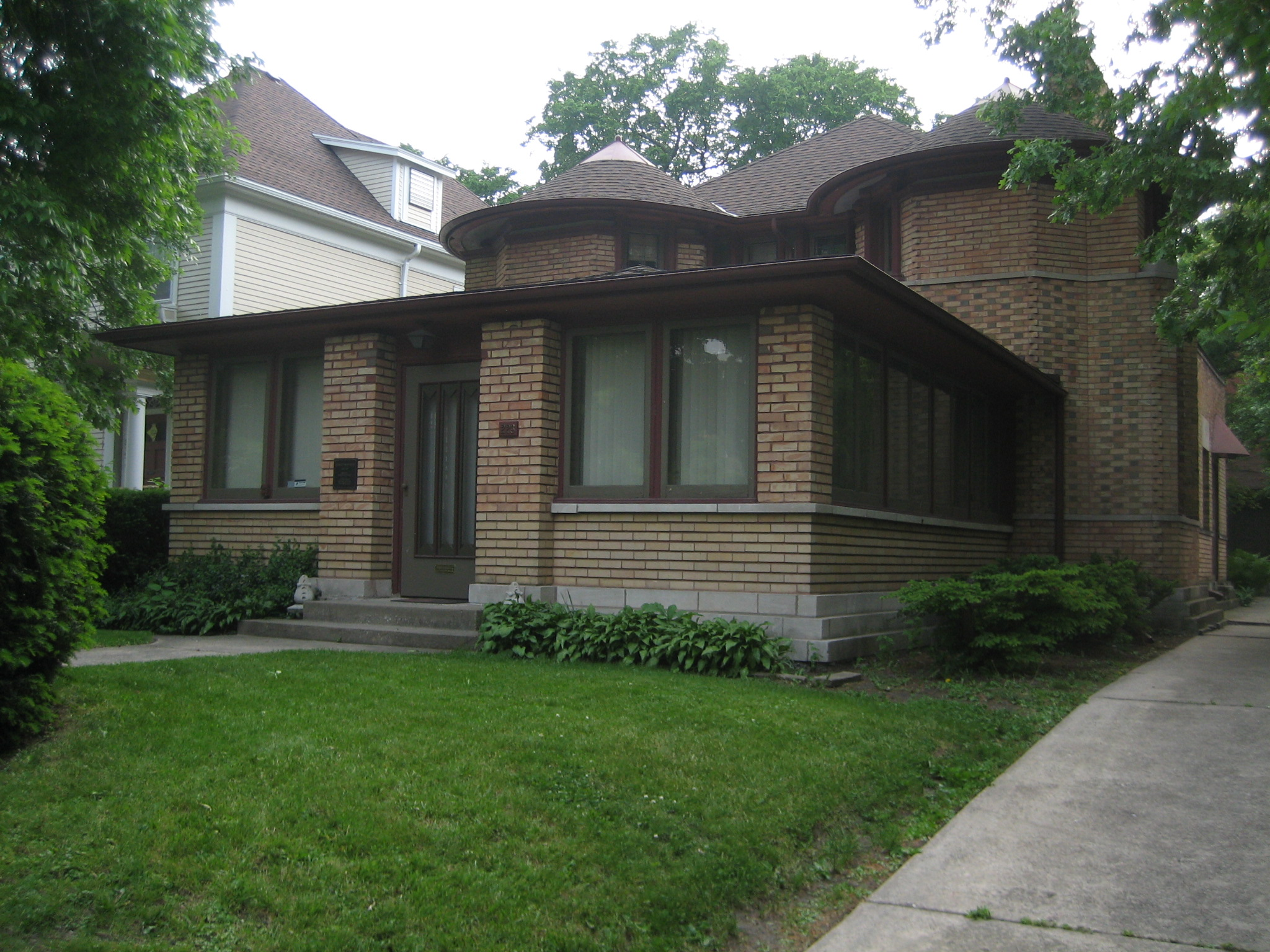

- Location within Illinois Location within the United States
- Interactive map showing the Furbeck House’s location
- Location: 223 N. Euclid Ave., Oak Park, Illinois
- Coordinates: 41°53′27″N 87°47′35″W
- Built: 1897
- Architect: Frank Lloyd Wright
- Architectural style: Queen Anne, Prairie style
- Part of: Frank Lloyd Wright-Prairie School of Architecture Historic District (ID73000699)
- Added to NRHP: December 4, 1973

The George W. Furbeck House is a home at 223 N. Euclid Avenue in Oak Park, a suburb of Chicago, Illinois, United States. The house was designed by the architect Frank Lloyd Wright in 1897 and constructed for Chicago electrical contractor George W. Furbeck and his new wife Sue Allin Harrington. The home's interior is much as it appeared when the house was completed but the exterior has seen some alteration. The house is an important example of Frank Lloyd Wright's transitional period of the late 1890s which culminated with the birth of the first fully mature early modern Prairie style house. The Furbeck House was listed as a contributing property to a U.S. federal Registered Historic District in 1973 and declared a local Oak Park Landmark in 2002.

== History ==
George Furbeck's father, Warren, purchased the future site of the George W. Furbeck House in 1892. Furbeck was working as an electrical contractor in Chicago at the time and maintained a residence with his parents. On April 9, 1897, the Oak Park Reporter announced that George Furbeck would be erecting a Frank Lloyd Wright designed home on the site his father had purchased five years earlier. The site of the Furbeck home provided George Furbeck with easy access to the Oak Park Avenue train station and thus, to his office in Chicago. On June 29, 1897, two weeks after ground was broken on his new home, Furbeck married Sue Allin Harrington of Michigan. The next day Warren Furbeck's deed for the site of the George Furbeck House was transferred to his son. The George Furbeck House was completed in late 1897 or early 1898.

The home's interior has seen very little alteration and is mostly intact as Wright originally envisioned it. The exterior underwent significant alteration in 1920 when the enclosed brick front porch was built on the retaining wall that surrounded the original, smaller, open porch. The third floor dormer was also extended as well.

== Architecture ==
The house was designed at the beginning of Wright's three-year period of experimentation that resulted in the fully mature Prairie house in the early 20th century with such projects as the Arthur Heurtley House and the Frank Thomas House, both in Oak Park. It combines elements from the traditional Queen Anne style and from Wright's own Prairie style, as such the home represents a transition by Wright toward early modern style.

The home's windows are wood with wooden frames and mostly casement style, most of the first floor windows are topped with plain gray limestone lintels. Some of the casement windows feature original art glass with simple geometric designs. The art glass, which is one of Wright's earliest completely original designs of the type, features three vertical lines with simple colored borders. When compared with the art glass on the Isidore Heller House, designed the same year, the Furbeck glass is uninteresting and may represent the start of Wright's glass border art work. Beneath the first and second floor windows a continuous stone sill course wraps around the house.

The front (east) elevation is framed by two octagonal towers and the entire structure is clad in a pink-colored brick. The building's hip roof features overhanging eaves, an element common to Prairie style architecture. The entire structure rests upon a stepped, limestone water table. The main feature of the front facade, besides the octagonal towers, is the 20 ft (6.10 m) X 20 ft, one-story sun porch projecting from the building. The sun porch has a low-pitched hip roof with an eave that projects over the front door, which is centered on the porch and flanked by two pairs of casement windows. Above the sun porch, on the second floor, is a pair of art glass doors which open onto a balcony between the two octagonal towers.

== Significance ==
The George Furbeck House is listed as a contributing property to the Frank Lloyd Wright-Prairie School of Architecture Historic District. The historic district was added to the U.S. National Register of Historic Places on December 4, 1973. On November 18, 2002, the Furbeck House was declared a local Oak Park Landmark by the Oak Park Village Board.

As part of Wright's transitional decade of the 1890s the Furbeck House is significant as the beginning of a three-year period of experimentation by the architect which resulted in the first fully modern style residential buildings. The George Furbeck House connects Wright's early period, which included geometric Queen Anne houses such as the Robert P. Parker House, with his fully mature Prairie style which resulted in early modern homes such as the Heurtley House. Prominent features reminiscent of Wright's early work includes the octagon towers; a shape he was exploring throughout his transitional decade. The home's rectilinear massing, hip roof, casement windows and horizontal sill course all featured extensively in later Prairie style homes by Wright.

== See also ==
- List of Frank Lloyd Wright works
