= Heller House =

Historic house in Chicago, Illinois

- Isidore H. Heller House
- U.S. National Register of Historic Places
- U.S. National Historic Landmark
- U.S. Historic district – Contributing property
- Chicago Landmark
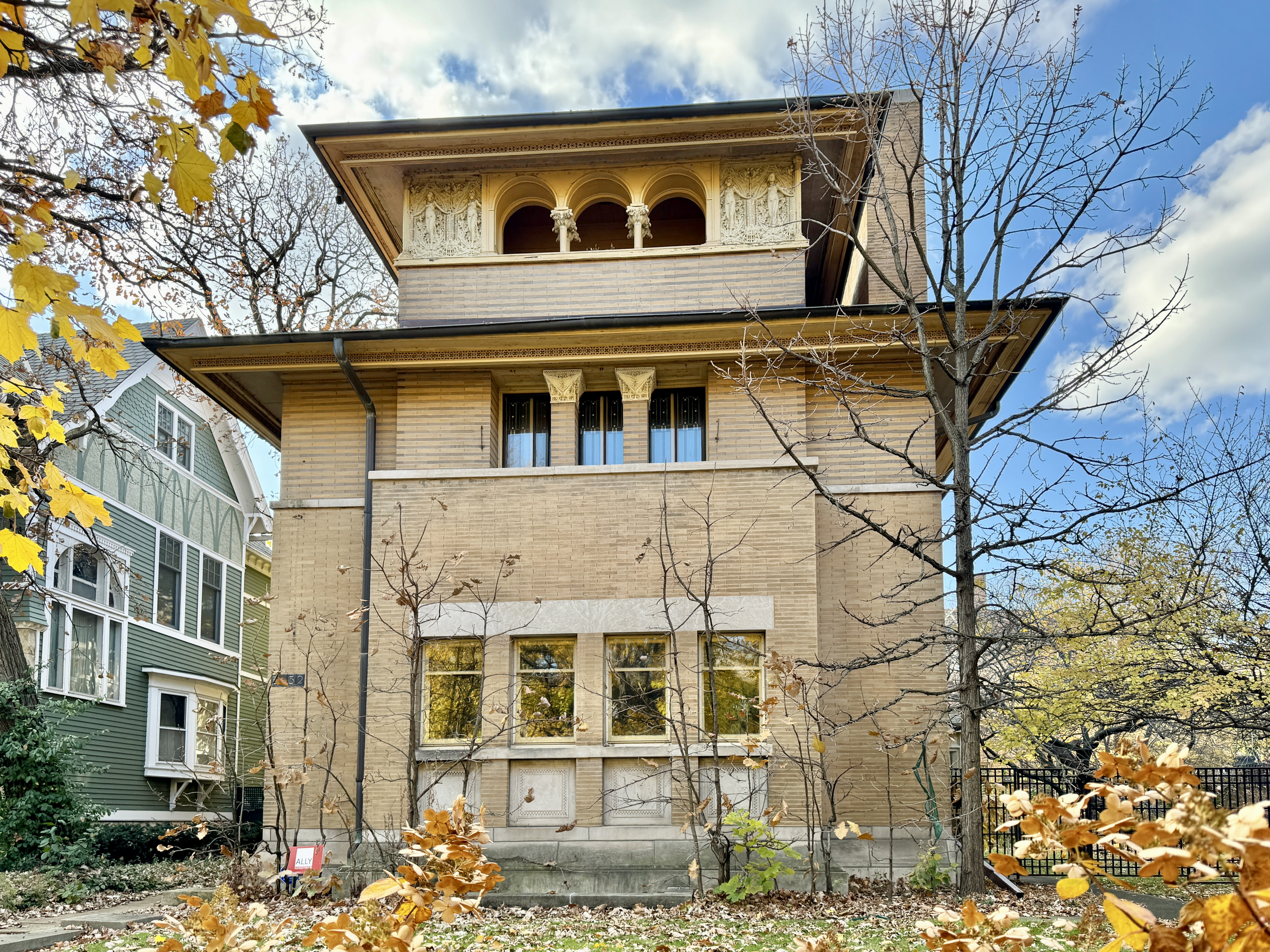

- Location within Chicago metropolitan area Location within Illinois Location within the United States
- Interactive map showing the location of the Heller House
- Location: 5132 South Woodlawn Avenue, Chicago, Illinois, United States
- Coordinates: 41°48′05.1″N 87°35′49.5″W
- Built: 1897
- Architect: Frank Lloyd Wright
- Part of: Hyde Park–Kenwood Historic District (ID79000824)
- NRHP reference No.: 72000450

Significant dates
- Added to NRHP: March 16, 1972
- Designated NHL: August 18, 2004
- Designated CHICL: September 15, 1971

The Isidore H. Heller House is a house at 5132 South Woodlawn Avenue in the Hyde Park neighborhood of Chicago in Illinois, United States. The house was designed by Frank Lloyd Wright and constructed in 1896 for the family of the merchant Isidore H. Heller. The design is credited as one of the turning points in Wright's shift to geometric, Prairie School architecture, which is defined by horizontal lines, flat or hipped roofs with broad overhanging eaves, windows grouped in horizontal bands, and an integration with the landscape, which is meant to evoke native Prairie surroundings.

The work demonstrates Wright's shift away from emulating the style of his mentor, Louis Sullivan. The facade is made of brick and is topped by a roof with a raised monitor section. Richard Bock, a Wright collaborator and sculptor, provided some of the ornamentation, including a plaster frieze. The house's first floor includes a living room, dining room, kitchen, and pantry, arranged around a stair and elevator. The second floor was devoted to bedrooms and bathrooms, while the third floor (originally used as servants' quarters and a bedroom) has been split into its own apartment.

The Heller family owned the house only until about 1913. Over the years, the building has been sold numerous times; the Goldstein family has owned the house since 2004. The Heller House is designated as a Chicago Landmark and is listed on the National Register of Historic Places as a National Historic Landmark.

== History ==
=== Heller use ===
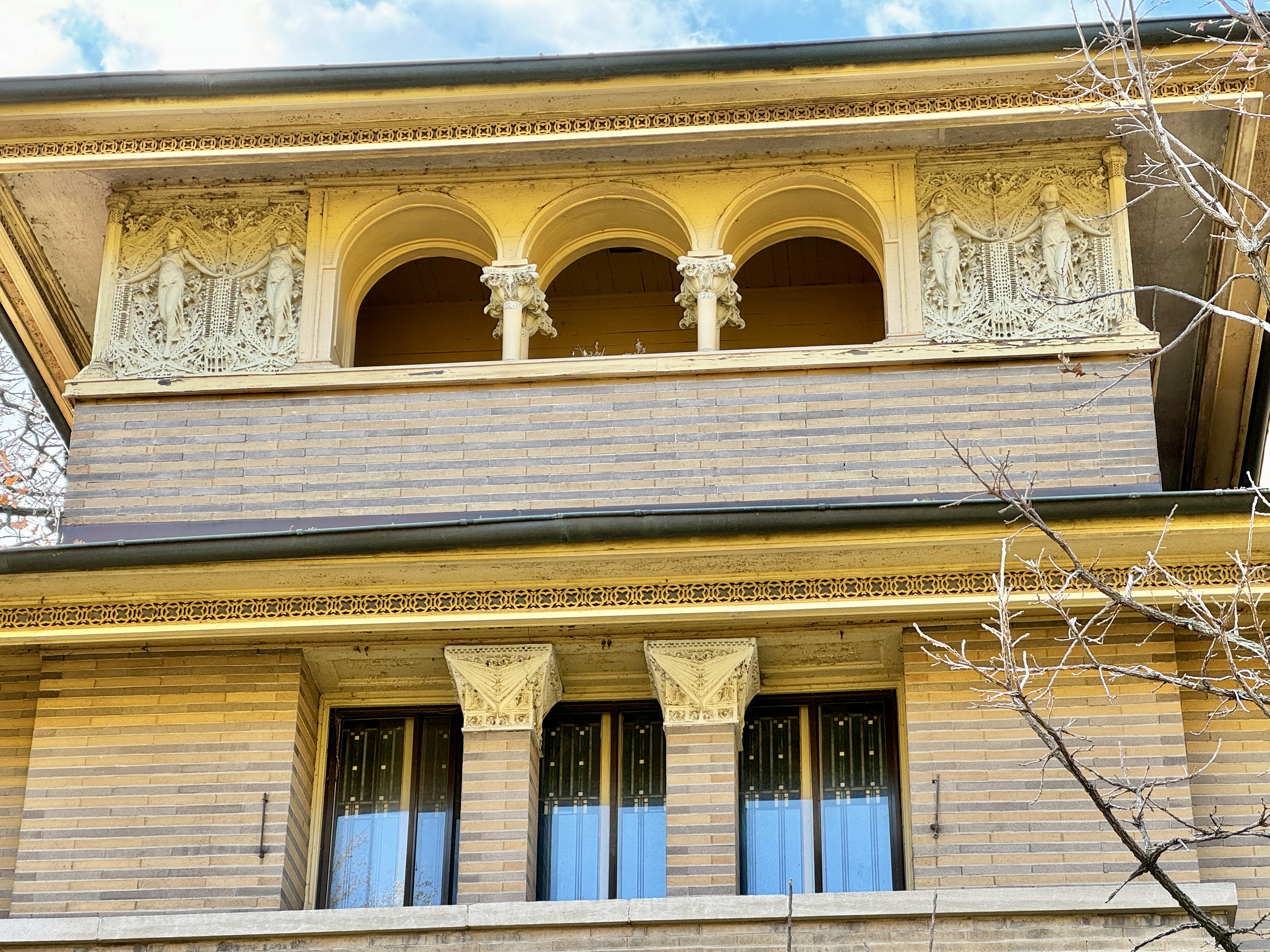
Detail of upper-story windows

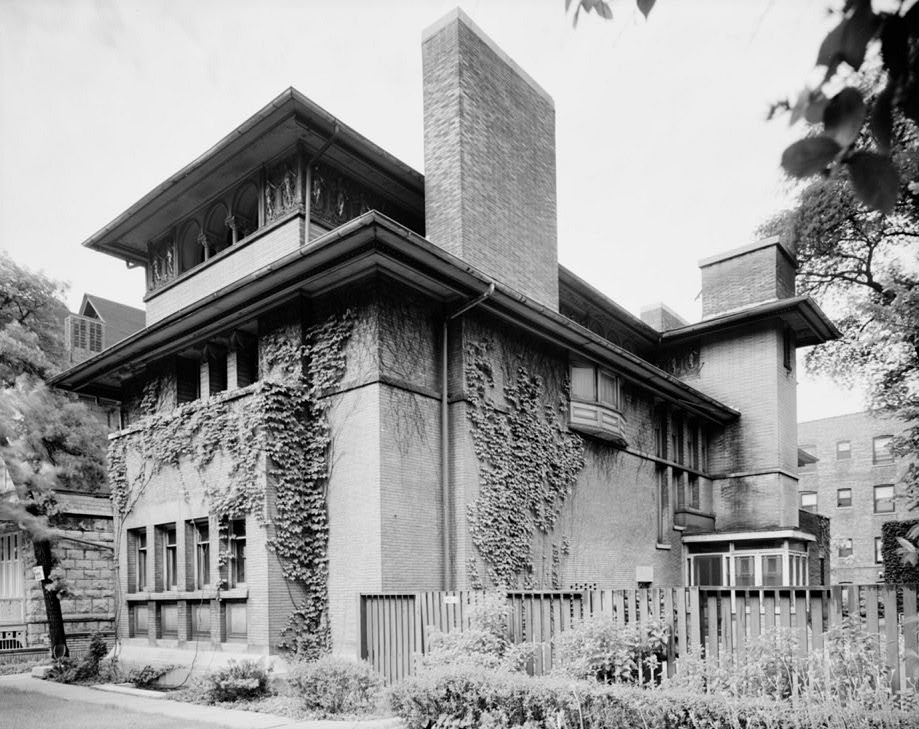
The east (left) and north (right) elevations of the Heller House

Little is known about Isidore H. Heller and his family, except through interviews, census records, and county records. Isidore Heller, an Austrian immigrant born in 1847, later married Ida, who came from Wisconsin and was ten years younger than him. After moving to the United States, Heller worked at Wolf, Sayer, and Heller: Packers and Butcher's Supplies on the northwest side of Chicago. The Hellers had three children, including Walter Heller, a Chicago investment banker.

Heller purchased land in the Hyde Park area of Chicago from Jonas Hamburger on January 2, 1895, and commissioned Frank Lloyd Wright to design the house in 1896. The total cost of the work is estimated at $12,500 (equivalent to $484,000 in 2025). William Adams is credited as the builder. In 1906, Heller purchased an additional 25 feet (7.6 m) to the north of his original plot.

=== Subsequent use ===
The Hellers lived in the house for about 16 years. Ida Heller, who had suffered from heart disease, died at the home on October 11, 1909, after falling there by accident. The house was sold to Frances Bickett in June 1913 for $27,000–27,500 (equivalent to $880,000–896,000 in 2025). Records indicate that by 1915, Heller had been living in Silver Lake for some years. Charles McFarlane acquired the house from the Bickett family by February 1914 for about $27,500 (equivalent to $884,000 in 2025). From 1924 to 1939 the Heller House was owned and occupied by Joseph Mayer and his wife, and the house became known as the "Joseph Mayer House" to local residents. Joseph died in 1936 and bequeathed most of his estate to his wife. The Mayers sold the home in 1939 to the family of Wilfred Fox, who reportedly made alterations to the home's third floor.

In 1948, George Watson purchased the home from Fox and owned it for the next 25 years, becoming the owner with the longest tenure. The Watsons converted the third-story servant rooms into an apartment during the 1950s; by the following decade, two college girls occupied that apartment. Lewis Bradford then bought the house in 1972, and had the exterior sandblasted. In 1977, Victor and Danielle Barcilon bought the house. They occupied it until 1987, when it was sold to David and Catherine Epstein. After Serafino Garella and Judith Bromley bought the house in 1995, they restored a bathroom and restored the master bedroom's fireplace. The house was resold in 2004 to Steve Goldstein, a cardiologist at Loyola University Chicago who described the house as "an investment in art and history".

Steve Goldstein was hired by Brandeis University in Massachusetts in 2011, and he and his wife Emily Novick placed the house for sale in January 2012. Though the house was initially listed for $2.5 million, the asking price was ultimately reduced to $2.425 million. The house remained unsold three years later; at the time, it often took longer for Wright–designed houses to be sold, and Goldstein did not want to lower the asking price. In 2014, tourists began visiting the house as part of the Wright Housewalk, which includes several Chicagoland buildings designed by Wright. After withdrawing the house from the real-estate market, Goldstein and Novick listed the house for sale again in 2016 for $2.4 million. The Goldstein family then renovated the house, updating the original elevator and repainting the rooms in their original colors. The family again attempted to sell the Heller House in May 2019, this time for $2.2 million; it still had not been sold by the next year.

== Architecture ==
In designing the Heller House, Wright eschewed more traditional styles in favor of a modern, geometric design, which served as a precursor to his later Prairie style work. Wright's design also exhibits the influence of his mentor Louis Sullivan. The house was intended to fill a relatively small lot, measuring 75 by 175 feet (23 by 53 m) across. The building itself has a frontage of 26 feet (7.9 m) on Woodlawn Avenue and a west–east depth of 98 feet (30 m). Plans indicate that there was supposed to have been a horse stable on the site, also designed by Wright, but this was never completed. The house is surrounded by both apartments and low-rise houses.

=== Exterior ===
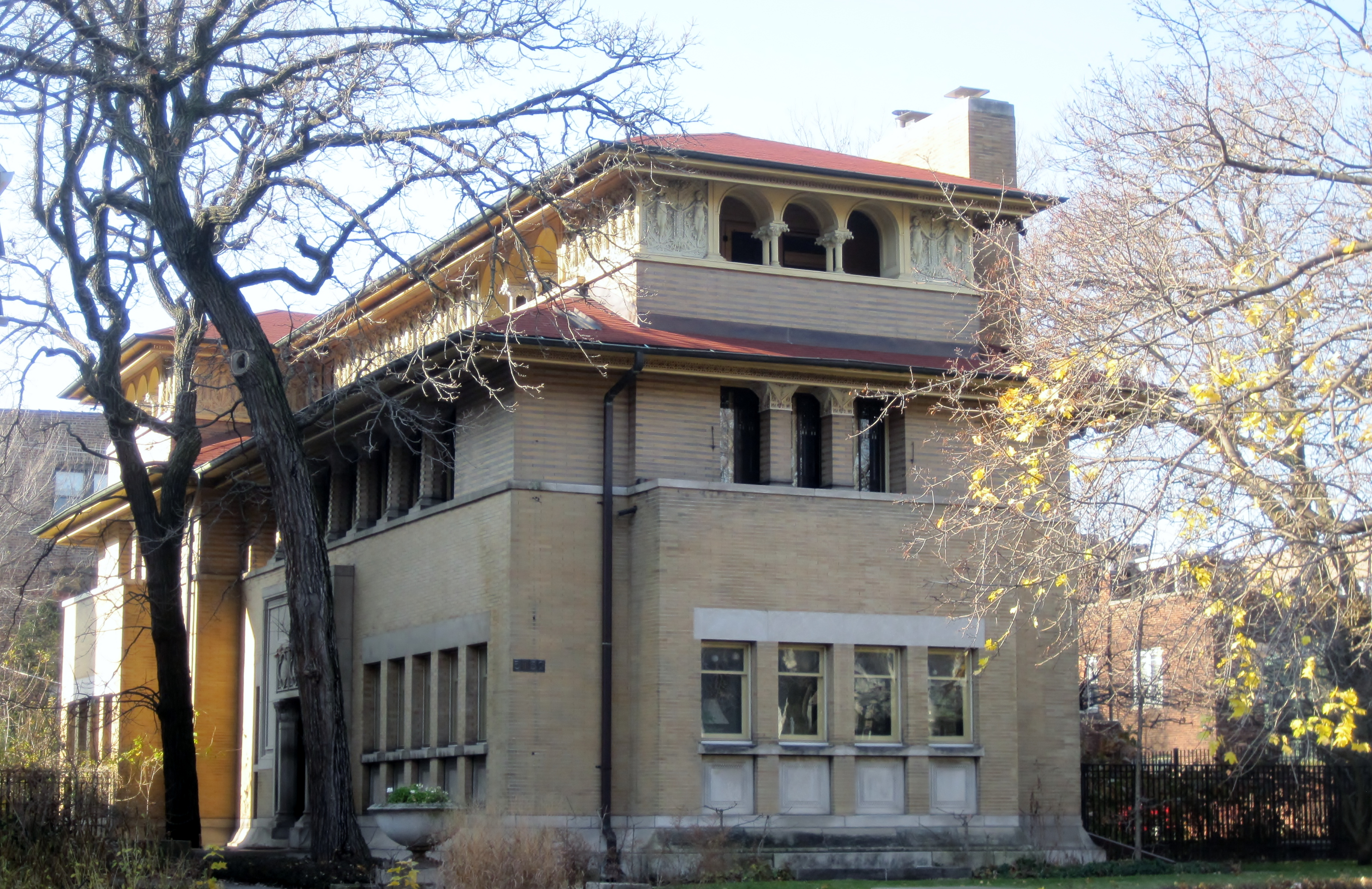
View of the house from across Woodlawn Avenue

The three-story, rectangular structure measures 41 feet (12 m) high. The facade is made mostly of yellow or buff Roman brick, which alternates with gray bricks on the second and third stories. Wright emphasized the horizontal axis further by using gray mortar for the horizontal joints between each row of bricks. The Heller House's windows are made of glazed, patterned stained glass panels; although such windows later became a characteristic of his Prairie style houses, Wright had never used it before. Some of the decorative features, such as loggias and protruding rooftop eaves, were reused in Wright's 1897 design for the Joseph W. Husser House. The roof, frieze, and loggias may have been inspired by the design of the Turkish pavilion at the 1893 World's Columbian Exposition, which had taken place nearby.

The house was constructed on a narrow lot, and the main entryway is on the side (similar to Wright's Warren McArthur House of 1892), rather than through the front. The door is on the center of the house's southern elevation. The entrance is adorned with Classical detailing and the cantilevered entry lintel, which sits on two ornately detailed stone columns. The lintel is decorated with quatrefoils, four-leafed motifs set on a stone panel. Just below the window sills of the second story are horizontal white string courses. On the eastern elevation, there are four windows on the first floor.

The upper-story windows are largely casement windows. There is a loggia with arches and plaster columns on the second floor's southern elevation, directly above the entrance. On the northern elevation, the second floor has a bay window. There is a roof atop part of the second floor, and the third story is set back behind this roof. On the third floor is a wide frieze designed by Richard Bock, a frequent collaborator of Wright's, who had taken inspiration from Louis Sullivan. Bock's frieze depicts female maidens, inspired by the figures on the cover page of John Keats's 1896 book The Eve of Saint Agnes. After designing the Heller House, Wright never again designed a building with an allegorical frieze at its top. Restoration work in the 1970s, which utilized sandblasting, destroyed much of the detail on the frieze. The third floor is topped by a hip roof, with a smaller monitor roof above the main roof. Parts of the roof overhang the facade, creating eaves.

=== Interior ===
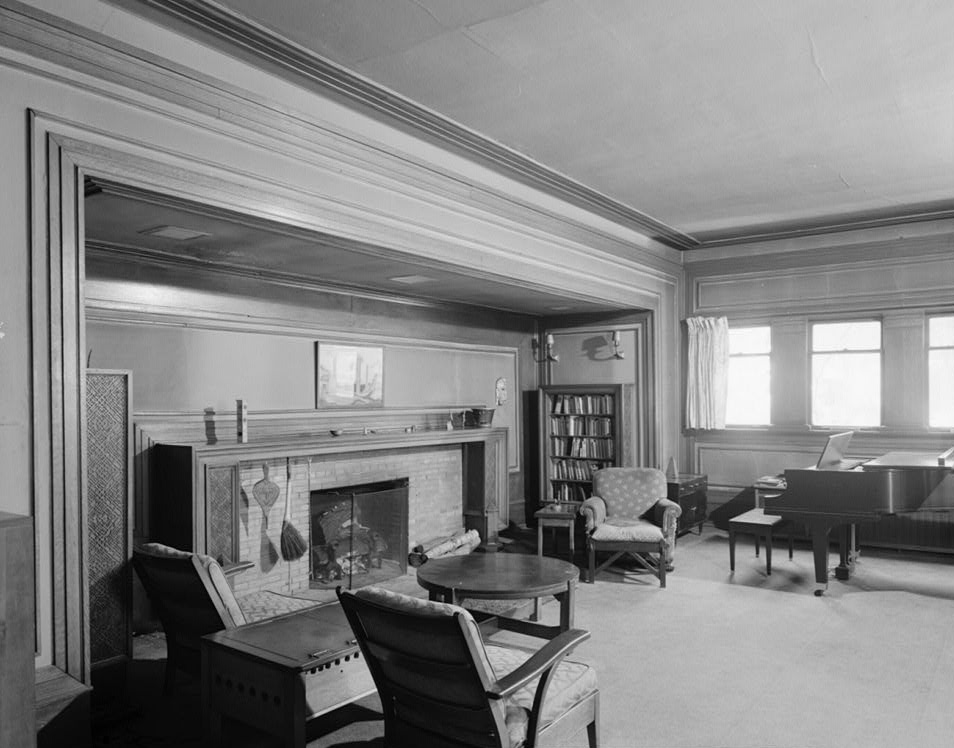
Living room

Although the National Park Service cites the mansion as having 9,267 square feet (861 m^{2}) of space, other sources cite the house as having 6,100 square feet (570 m^{2}) with seven bedrooms. The primary section of the residence has five bedrooms and three bathrooms. The house is one room wide throughout much of its depth. In a similar manner to Wright's houses for the McAfee and Husser families in the late 1890s, the floor plan is shaped like an "I", with a central stair hall bisecting the building. There are four fireplaces throughout the house. In addition, there is a detached garage that can fit two cars. Quarter-sawn oak trim was used throughout the house. The house has closets and high ceilings, in contrast to Wright's later work, which tended to have low ceilings and lack closets.

The first-story rooms have sash windows, sand-plaster walls, and oak trim. The living room, at the eastern end of the house, is separated from the dining room and service areas by a central stair hall. The vestibule is not split by a corridor or side hall, making it more spacious; this design was intended to entice visitors. The western wall of the vestibule originally had a door leading to the reception hall, but this was later replaced with a mirror and bookshelves. A hallway extends west–east across the house's first floor and leads to the reception, living, dining, and service rooms. A stair to the second floor, with a wooden balustrade, leads from this hallway. The living room to the east is cruciform in plan; it is painted gold, yellow, and green, with a brick-and-oak fireplace mantel and bookshelves. To the southwest is the dining room, another cruciform space. The dining room also has a brick-and-oak fireplace, in addition to pine finishes and sash windows. Next to the dining room, there is a pantry connecting with a kitchen, both of which are also furnished in pine. Northeast of the elevator core is a porch with windows and a wooden frame.

The stair from the first floor to the second is illuminated by colored glass windows. The second floor was initially devoted to bedrooms and bathrooms; it includes a master bedroom with a fireplace that, for many years, was hidden from view. An elevator leads to the third floor, which was originally supposed to contain a servants' quarters and a playroom. This was later converted to a five-room apartment with a bathroom and two bedrooms. Some evidence of the original playroom, including bead boards, remains intact.

== Impact ==
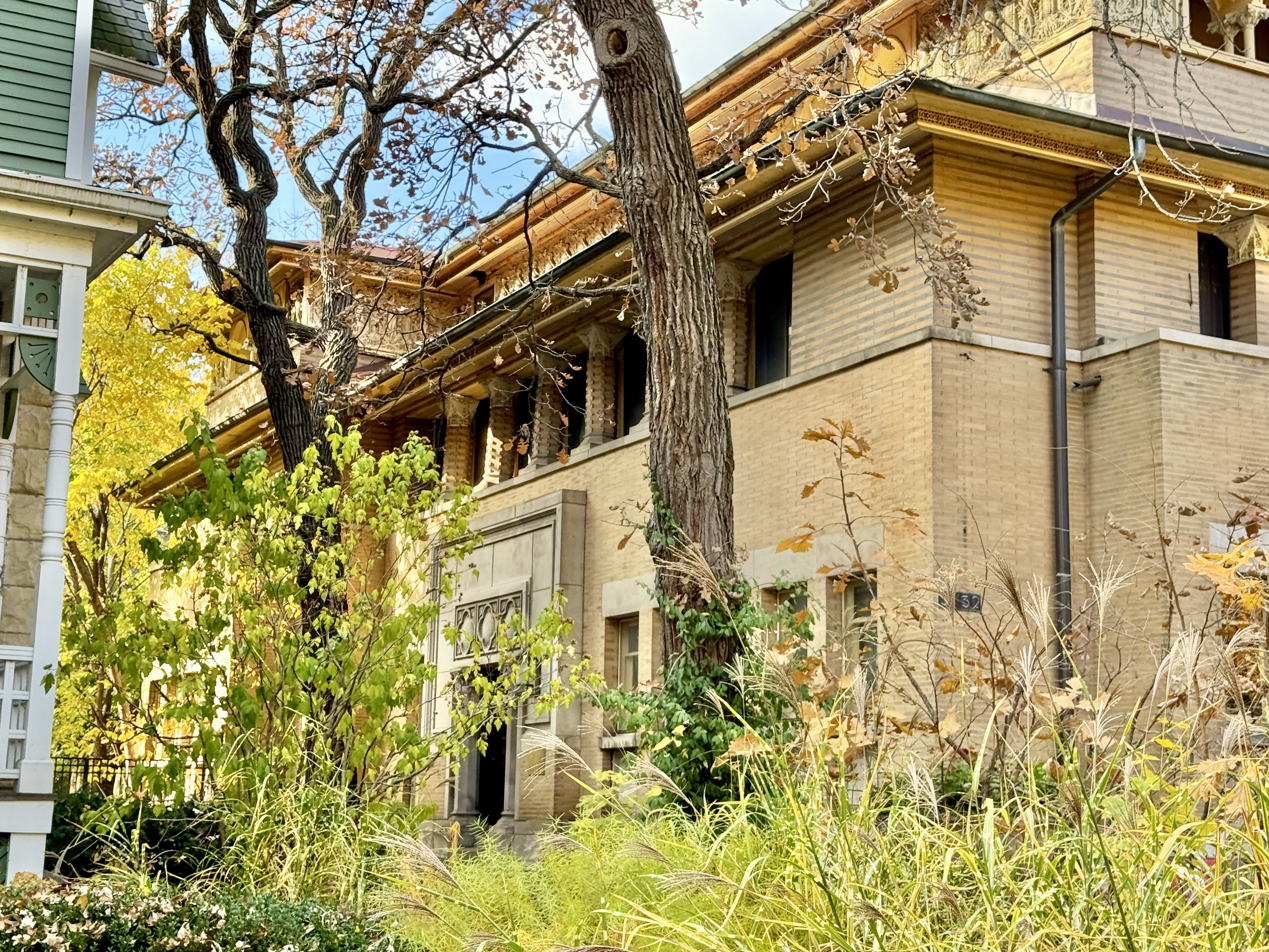
The south (left) and east (right) elevations of the Heller House

The Heller House was Wright's first work in the Hyde Park neighborhood of Chicago. The area's architecture had been was influenced by the Gothic Revival work of Henry Ives Cobb. The house blends key elements of Wright's Prairie style and is located within a half mile of other early works. Wright's Robie House is six blocks from the Heller House, and the Blossom House and McArthur House are nearby, in Kenwood. Around the time of the Heller House's construction, Hyde Park was experiencing rapid development due to its incorporation into the city of Chicago in 1889, the establishment of the University of Chicago in 1892, and the Columbian Exposition in 1893. Many of the houses built during this era are surrounded by elaborate gardens.

In a 1987 book about Wright's architecture, the journalist Brendan Gill wrote that the Heller House "fills its constricted sleeve of space with deceptive ease". The architectural writer Thomas J. O'Gorman said that the Heller House's design showed Wright's "ever-deepening movement toward his ultimate Prairie consciousness", calling it "his most outrageous design to date".

Soon after Wright completed the Heller House, he also designed the Rollin Furbeck House in Oak Park, Illinois, which shares design elements such as a brick facade and an upper-story loggia. Leftover plaster casts for the Heller House's fireplace were reused for the fireplace in Wright's own Oak Park studio. The house was showcased in a 1966 exhibition of Wright's work, and two capitals from the house's facade were displayed at New York's Museum of Modern Art in 1994. The Heller House was designated a Chicago Landmark on September 15, 1971, and added to the National Register of Historic Places on March 16, 1972. On August 18, 2004, the U.S. Department of the Interior designated the house a National Historic Landmark.

== See also ==
- List of Frank Lloyd Wright works
- List of Chicago Landmarks
- List of National Historic Landmarks in Illinois
- National Register of Historic Places listings in South Side Chicago
- Emil Bach House
- Frank Lloyd Wright Historic District
- James Charnley House
