= Blair Kamin =

American architecture critic

- Born: Red Bank, New Jersey, US
- Education: Amherst College (BA); Yale University (MA)
- Occupation: Chicago Tribune architecture critic
- Notable credit: 1999 Pulitzer Prize for Criticism
- Spouse: Barbara Mahany
- Children: 2

Blair Kamin is an American journalist and architecture critic. He was the Chicago Tribune's architecture critic from 1992 to 2021. Kamin has held other jobs at the Tribune and previously worked for The Des Moines Register. He also serves as a contributing editor of Architectural Record. He won the Pulitzer Prize for Criticism in 1999, for a body of work highlighted by a series of articles about the problems and promise of Chicago's greatest public space, its lakefront. He has received numerous other honors, authored books, lectured widely, and served as a visiting critic at architecture schools including the Harvard University Graduate School of Design.

== Background ==
Born in Red Bank, New Jersey, Kamin is a graduate of Amherst College, from which he received a Bachelor of Arts with honors in 1979, and the Yale University School of Architecture, from which he received a Master of Environmental Design in 1984. In 1999 he was a visiting fellow at the Franke Institute for the Humanities at the University of Chicago. In 2012–2013, he was a fellow at the Nieman Foundation for Journalism at Harvard University. He holds honorary degrees from Monmouth University and North Central College. At North Central, he was an adjunct professor of art.

Prior to being the architecture critic for the Chicago Tribune, Kamin served as its culture and suburban reporter from 1987 to 1992. He was a reporter and architecture writer for The Des Moines Register from 1984 to 1987. He had once worked as an office clerk for a San Francisco interior design and architecture firm. He has lectured in forums such as American Institute of Architects' National Convention, the annual meeting of the Frank Lloyd Wright Building Conservancy, the Ravinia Festival and Steppenwolf Theatre. He has discussed architecture on programs ranging from ABC's Nightline, History Channel, National Public Radio to WTTW-Ch. 11's Chicago Tonight. In 2014, he briefly appeared on The Daily Show, when the show's then-host, Jon Stewart, made light of a large and controversial sign that the real estate developer Donald Trump placed on his Chicago skyscraper.

== Publications ==
The University of Chicago Press has published three collections of Kamin's Chicago Tribune columns: "Why Architecture Matters: Lessons from Chicago" (2001); "Terror and Wonder: Architecture In a Tumultuous Age" (2010); and "Who Is the City For? Architecture, Equity, and the Public Realm in Chicago" (2022). Kamin also wrote the commentaries for "Tribune Tower: American Landmark," a guide to the newspaper's neo-Gothic Tribune Tower skyscraper published in 2000. During his Nieman Fellowship, Kamin co-wrote and edited an ebook, "The Gates of Harvard Yard: The Complete Story, in Words and Pictures, of a Great University's Iconic Portals." The ebook was published by the Nieman Foundation. In 2016, Princeton Architectural Press published a paperback version of the book, "Gates of Harvard Yard." In 2020, Princeton Architectural Press published another Kamin book, "Amherst College: The Campus Guide," which presents six walking tours of the 1,000-acre New England campus. In 2026, Harvard University Press published a hardcover edition of "Gates of Harvard Yard."

Kamin cites as his influences Paul Gapp, Paul Goldberger, Lois Wagner Green, Ada Louise Huxtable, Vincent Scully, Allan Temko, and Joel Upton. Kamin's wife is the author and former Tribune reporter Barbara Mahany. They have two sons, Ted and Will.

== Awards ==
Published in 1998, Kamin's six-part series, “Reinventing the Lakefront” shed light on numerous problems along the city's shoreline, such as the disparity between lakefront parks bordered by largely white and affluent areas on Chicago's North Side and those lined by black and poor neighborhoods on the city's South Side. Following the publication of the deeply reported essays, Mayor Richard M. Daley and the Chicago Park District authorized comprehensive plans for four of Chicago's seven lakefront parks, an area of nearly 2,000 acres and more than 10 miles of shoreline. In addition, the city altered its plan for a former U.S. Steel site on the far south lakefront, bringing the total area affected by the series to almost 2,500 acres and 12 miles of shoreline.

Kamin's 1999 Pulitzer entry in criticism consisted of four parts of the six-part lakefront series, plus six other works of criticism on subjects ranging from the renovation of the North Michigan Avenue Marriott Hotel to an addition to Chicago's Adler Planetarium. After the first round of the two-round Pulitzer judging, his entry was moved from the criticism category to the beat reporting category. The Chicago Reader described the situation as one in which "every jury that read his stories wanted someone else to judge them". One of the criticism jurors described the dilemma "He seems to do some investigative reporting and some advocacy editorializing, and some members of the panel didn't quite know what to make of it. So we did the cowardly thing and sent it to another panel." But the Pulitzer Prize Board, which has the ultimate authority, reversed the decision and moved Kamin's entry back to criticism. Kamin's Pulitzer Prize citation praised "his lucid coverage of city architecture, including an influential series supporting the development of Chicago's lakefront area.”

Kamin has won or shared 50 awards. Among his other honors are the George Polk Award for Criticism (1996), the American Institute of Architects' Institute Honor for Collaborative Achievement (1999) and the AIA's Presidential Citation, conferred in 2004. In 2013, the Society of Architectural Historians recognized him with an award for excellence in architectural criticism. From 1993 to 2019, he won or shared 16 Peter Lisagor Awards for Exemplary Journalism from the Chicago Headline Club. Kamin also was part of the collaborative team that won the 2003 National Magazine Award for General Excellence for the Architectural Record. He has twice served as a Pulitzer Prize juror. In 2023, he was named to the design team selection committee for the Fallen Journalists Memorial in Washington, D.C. He was named by the governor of Illinois as a 2026 recipient of the Order of Lincoln, an award which recognizes "remarkable contributions to the betterment of humanity in or on behalf of the State of Illinois."

== Selected works ==
- Kamin, Blair (2003-06-15). Why Architecture Matters: Lessons from Chicago. University of Chicago Press. ISBN 0-226-42322-0.
- Terror and Wonder: Architecture in a Tumultuous Age (University of Chicago Press, 2010) ISBN 978-0-226-42311-1
