= Edwin Cheney =

American electrical engineer

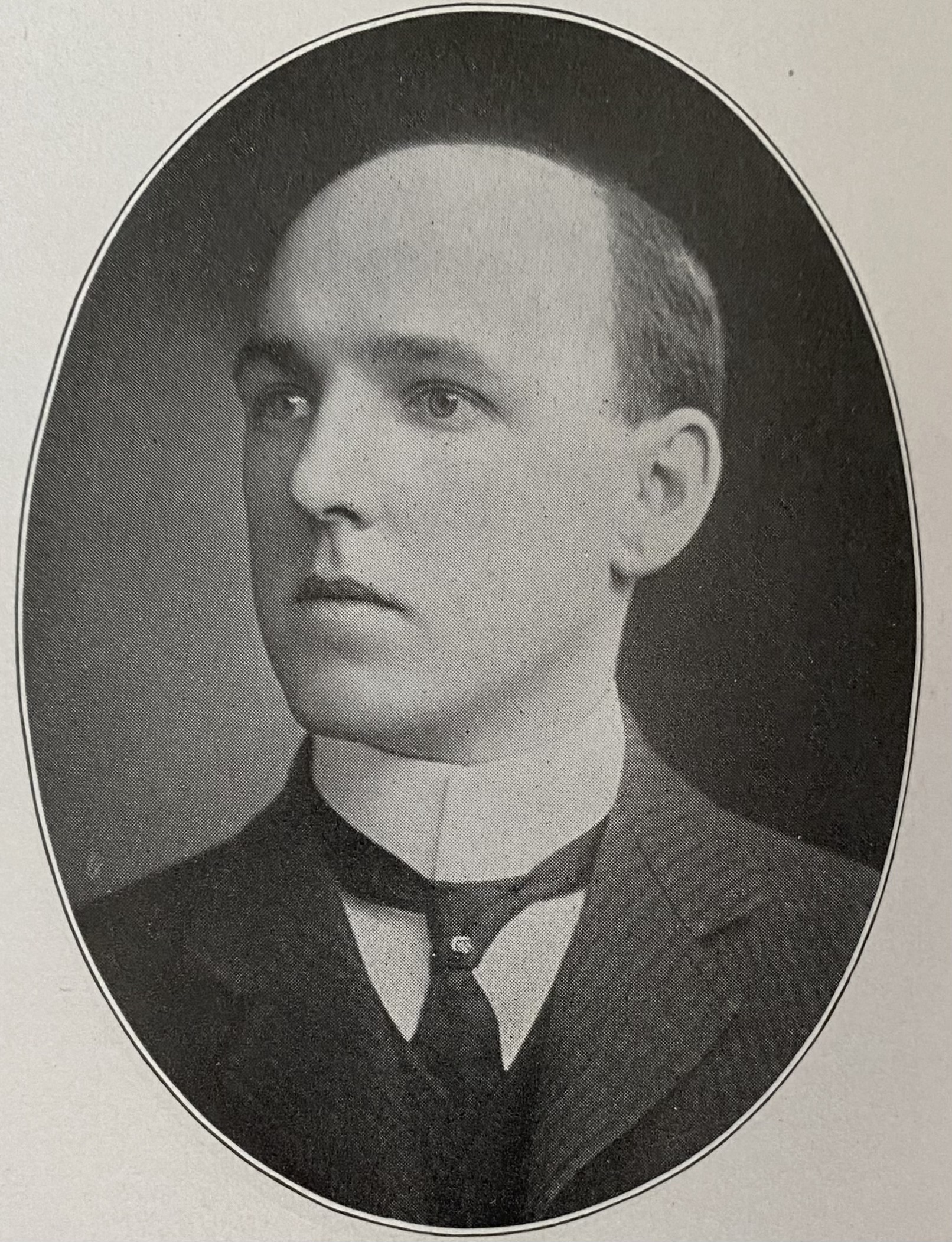
Edwin Cheney ca. 1902

Edwin Henry Cheney (June 13, 1869 — December 18, 1942) was an American electrical engineer from Oak Park, Illinois, United States.

He was the son of James Wilson Cheney and Armilla Armanda, daughter of Linus S. and Rebekah J. (Jaegger) Perkins. His father was born in Royalton, Massachusetts, and moved to Maine with his parents ca. 1850. James W. entered Oberlin College in 1860 before enlisting in the 7th Ohio Infantry in April 1861. After his marriage to Armilla Perkins on May 27, 1868, he moved from Shelbyville, Illinois to Detroit in 1870, where he engaged in manufacturing tool-handles and other specialty items. Edwin's adopted sister, Luella Emory Cheney, was born April 11, 1871.

Cheney was born in Shelbyville and grew up in Detroit, attending the public schools there. He attended the University of Michigan, graduating in 1892 with a Bachelor's degree in Electrical Engineering. Upon graduation, he moved to Chicago to begin his career with the Chicago Edison Co. (now known as Commonwealth Edison). He worked in various areas throughout his career, including electrical contracting and construction, steam heating, and fuel engineering. He held a U.S. patent for an improved boiler setting.

He married fellow University of Michigan alumnus Mamah Borthwick on June 15, 1899, at the Borthwick family home in Oak Park. They had two children, John and Martha.

Cheney commissioned Frank Lloyd Wright to build his family a home in Oak Park, now called the Edwin H. Cheney House. Wright engaged in a love affair with Mamah Cheney, with whom he went to Europe in 1909. Upon their return, Mamah moved into Taliesin, the new house Wright was building for them, while it was still under construction. Mamah and Edwin Cheney were divorced in 1911. A year later, Edwin married Elizabeth Meller, a schoolteacher friend of Mamah's sister Lizzie Borthwick.

On August 15, 1914, a domestic servant at Taliesin named Julian Carlton killed Mamah Borthwick, along with John and Martha Cheney, who happened to be visiting (Edwin Cheney had primary custody). Four others were also murdered during this event.

After the murder of his biological children, Cheney and his second wife adopted 3 more children. They moved to Webster Groves, Missouri in 1926, following Cheney's promotion to Vice President of Sales for the Wagner Electric Corporation. He had begun work for Wagner in 1909 as its Chicago district manager. He worked for Wagner until his death.
