= Frank Lloyd Wright–Prairie School of Architecture Historic District =

Historic district in Illinois, United States

- Frank Lloyd Wright/Prairie School of Architecture Historic District
- U.S. National Register of Historic Places
- U.S. Historic district
- Overview of several houses designed by Frank Lloyd Wright on Forest Ave.

- Location within Illinois Location within the United States
- Location: Bounded roughly by Harlem Ave., Division, Clyde, and Lake Sts., Oak Park, Illinois
- Coordinates: 41°53′37″N 87°47′32″W
- Area: 457 acres (185 ha)
- Architect: Frank Lloyd Wright, et al.
- Architectural style: Prairie style
- NRHP reference No.: 73000699
- Added to NRHP: December 4, 1973

The Frank Lloyd Wright/Prairie School of Architecture Historic District is located in the village of Oak Park in Cook County, Illinois, United States. The Frank Lloyd Wright Historic District is both a federally designated historic district listed on the U.S. National Register of Historic Places and a local historic district within the village of Oak Park. The districts have differing boundaries and contributing properties, over 20 of which were designed by Frank Lloyd Wright, widely regarded as the greatest American architect.

== History ==
Oak Park, Illinois was first settled in 1835 and incorporated as a village in 1901. Architect Frank Lloyd Wright came there in 1889 and designed his home, which was built in 1889. In 1897, he added the studio along Chicago Avenue. Wright brought international attention to the village, designing 25 structures there in all, most of them within the historic district. The Frank Lloyd Wright–Prairie School of Architecture Historic District provides a look at a cross section of Wright's work which spans several decades over his career. Some of his earliest works are within the district, leading up to buildings he designed during his "first mature period". In 1972, the village of Oak Park created and designated the Frank Lloyd Wright–Prairie School of Architecture Historic District as a local historic district under its municipal laws. In December 1973, it was added as a federal historic district on the U.S. National Register of Historic Places.

== Boundaries ==
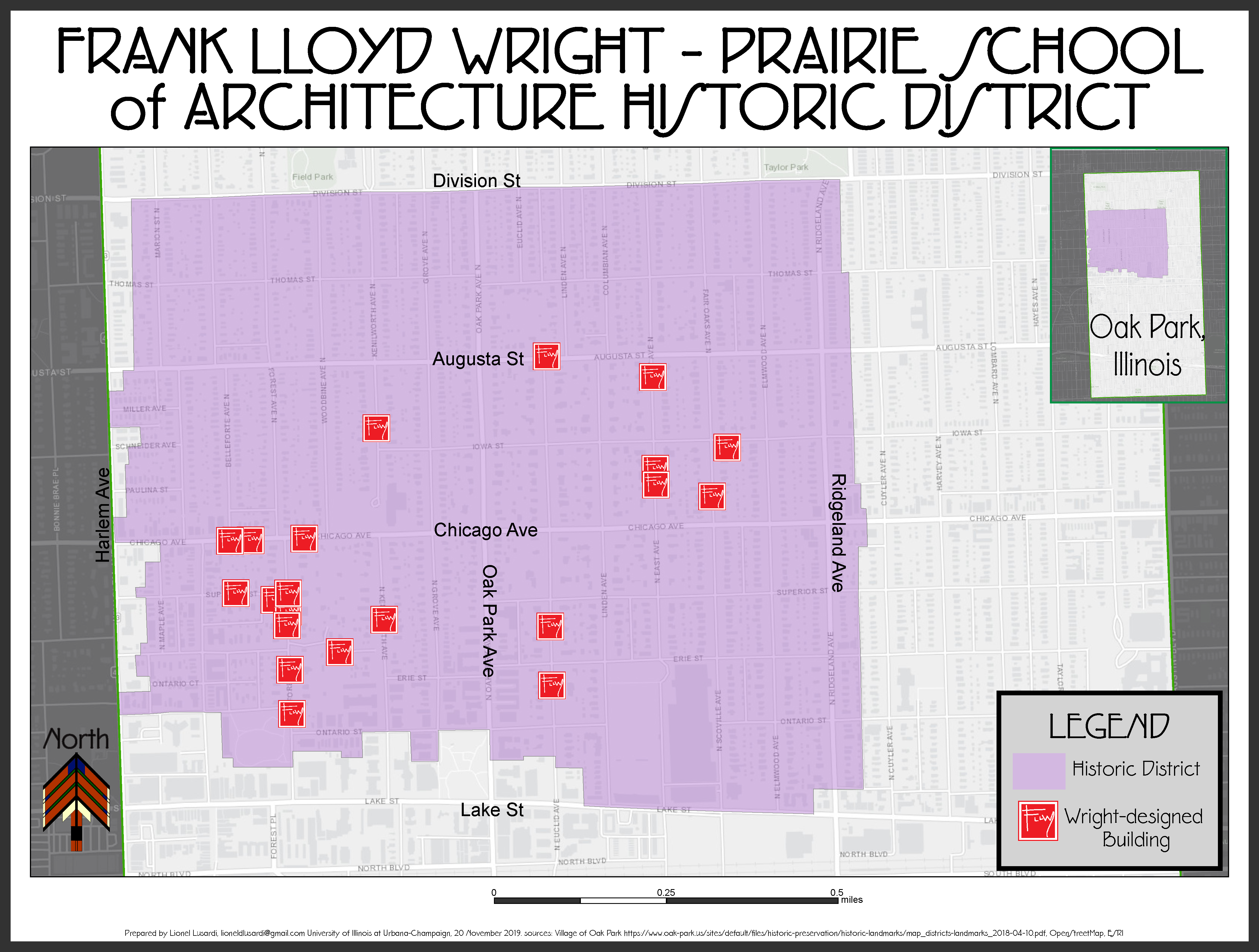
Map of the local boundaries of the Frank Lloyd Wright-Prairie School of Architecture Historic District

The Frank Lloyd Wright Historic District's boundaries for its National Register listing is roughly the Oak Park roads of Clyde Street, Division Street, Lake Street and a combination of Harlem Avenue. The district's local boundaries are irregular but more specifically it is bounded by Division Street on its north, Lake Street on its south, Ridgeland Avenue on its east, and Marion Street and Woodbine Avenue on its west.

== Architecture ==
Over 80 of the houses and buildings within the boundaries of the federal historic district were designed by Frank Lloyd Wright and other adherents to his early modern Prairie style architecture. Besides the Prairie structures there are examples of 1860s Italianate and 1920s Tudor Revival and Classical Revival in the district as well.

=== Structures ===
There are approximately 1,500 buildings within the boundaries of the local Frank Lloyd Wright Historic District. Of that number about 1,300 contribute to the historic character of the district. The federally designated Frank Lloyd Wright historic district is less encompassing including only 80 structures, all of which are listed as contributing properties. The Frank Lloyd Wright designs include the Mrs. Thomas H. Gale House, Nathan G. Moore Residence, Arthur Heurtley House, Frank Thomas House, Edwin H. Cheney House, George Furbeck House, Oscar B. Balch House, and nearly twenty others.

== Significance ==
The historic district is of the highest significance on a national level for its residential architecture. Of the buildings within the historic district, over 20 of them were designed by Frank Lloyd Wright. Besides the structures designed by Wright, there are 60 other buildings designed by colleagues, students, followers and other adherents of Wright's Prairie School of architecture. The National Register of Historic Places form called the district "undoubtedly the largest concentration of early modern architecture to be found anywhere in the world." It was added to the National Register on December 4, 1973.

== See also ==
- List of Frank Lloyd Wright works
- National Register of Historic Places listings in Cook County, Illinois
