= Mamah Borthwick =

American translator (1869–1914)

Mamah Bouton Borthwick
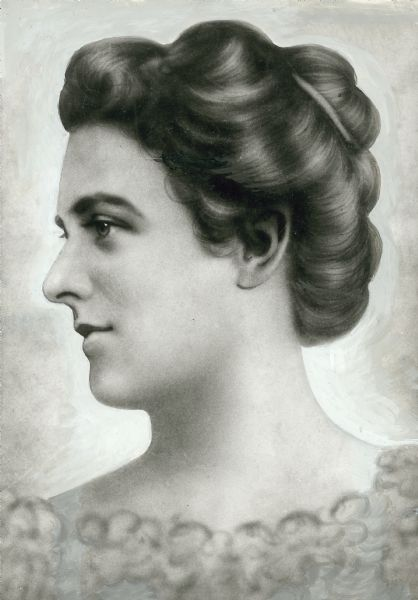
- Mamah Borthwick, c. 1911
- Born: Martha Bouton Borthwick; June 19, 1869; Boone, Iowa, U.S.
- Died: August 15, 1914 (aged 45); Spring Green, Wisconsin, U.S.
- Cause of death: Murder
- Other name: Mamah Borthwick
- Spouse: Edwin Cheney (m. 1899; div. 1911)
- Partner: Frank Lloyd Wright
- Children: 2

Martha Bouton "Mamah" Borthwick (June 19, 1869 – August 15, 1914) was an American translator who had a romantic relationship with architect Frank Lloyd Wright, which ended when she was murdered. She and Wright were instrumental in bringing the ideas and writings of Swedish feminist Ellen Key to American audiences. Wright built his famous settlement called Taliesin in Wisconsin for her, in part, to shield her from aggressive reporters and the negative public sentiment surrounding their non-married status. Both had left their spouses and children in 1909 in order to live together and were the subject of relentless public censure. In 1914, a member of the staff at Taliesin murdered Borthwick, her two children and others. Wright was away at the time.

== Early life and education ==
She was born as Martha (or Mary or Mariah Martha) Bouton Borthwick to Marcus Smith Borthwick (November 24, 1838 – April 1900) and his wife Almira (November 30, 1838 – January 28, 1898) in Boone, Iowa.

She had two sisters: Jessie Octavia Borthwick Pitkin (1864–1901) and Elizabeth Vilitta Borthwick (1866–1946). Borthwick earned her BA and MA at the University of Michigan in 1892 and 1893. She later worked as a librarian in Port Huron, Michigan.

== Marriage and family ==
In 1899, Borthwick married Edwin Cheney, an electrical engineer from Oak Park, Illinois. They had two children: John (1902–1914) and Martha (1905–1914). Before their children, they adopted Mamah Borthwick's niece, Jessie Borthwick Pitkin, when Mamah's sister (Jessie Octavia Borthwick Pitkin) died during childbirth in 1901.

== Relationship with Wright ==
Borthwick met Frank Lloyd Wright's wife, Catherine, through a social club. Soon after, Edwin commissioned Wright to design them a home in Oak Park, now known as the Edwin H. Cheney House. Mamah's sister, Elizabeth Vilitta Borthwick, lived in an apartment on the lower level of the house.

In 1909, Borthwick and Wright left their spouses and traveled to Europe. Wright returned to the United States around a year later in October 1910. Meanwhile, Borthwick remained in Europe so that she could obtain a divorce from her husband for the reason of abandonment. During her time in Europe, she began translating the works of the Swedish feminist thinker and writer Ellen Key, whom she admired. In April 1911, Wright's mother purchased land in her family's valley near Spring Green, Wisconsin so that her son could begin designing a home in which to live with Borthwick after her planned divorce. He named the home Taliesin (Welsh for "Shining Brow").

Borthwick returned to the United States in June 1911. She spent time with her children in Canada through the summer waiting to divorce Edwin Cheney, which she did on August 5, and legally returned to her maiden name. Borthwick joined Wright at Taliesin that month, which was then being constructed.

The press became aware of the couple living together at Taliesin shortly before Christmas 1911. The editor of the Spring Green newspaper (the Weekly Home News) condemned Wright for bringing scandal to the village. The press, which reported the European trip as a "spiritual hegira", called Borthwick and Wright "soul mates" and also referred to Taliesin as the "love castle" or "love bungalow". Chicago newspapers criticized Wright, implying that he would soon be arrested for immorality, despite statements from the local sheriff that he could not prove that the couple was doing anything wrong. Most of their friends and acquaintances considered their open closeness to be scandalous, especially since Catherine had refused to agree to a divorce. The scandal affected Wright's career for several years; he did not receive his next major commission, the Midway Gardens, until 1913.

== Murder ==
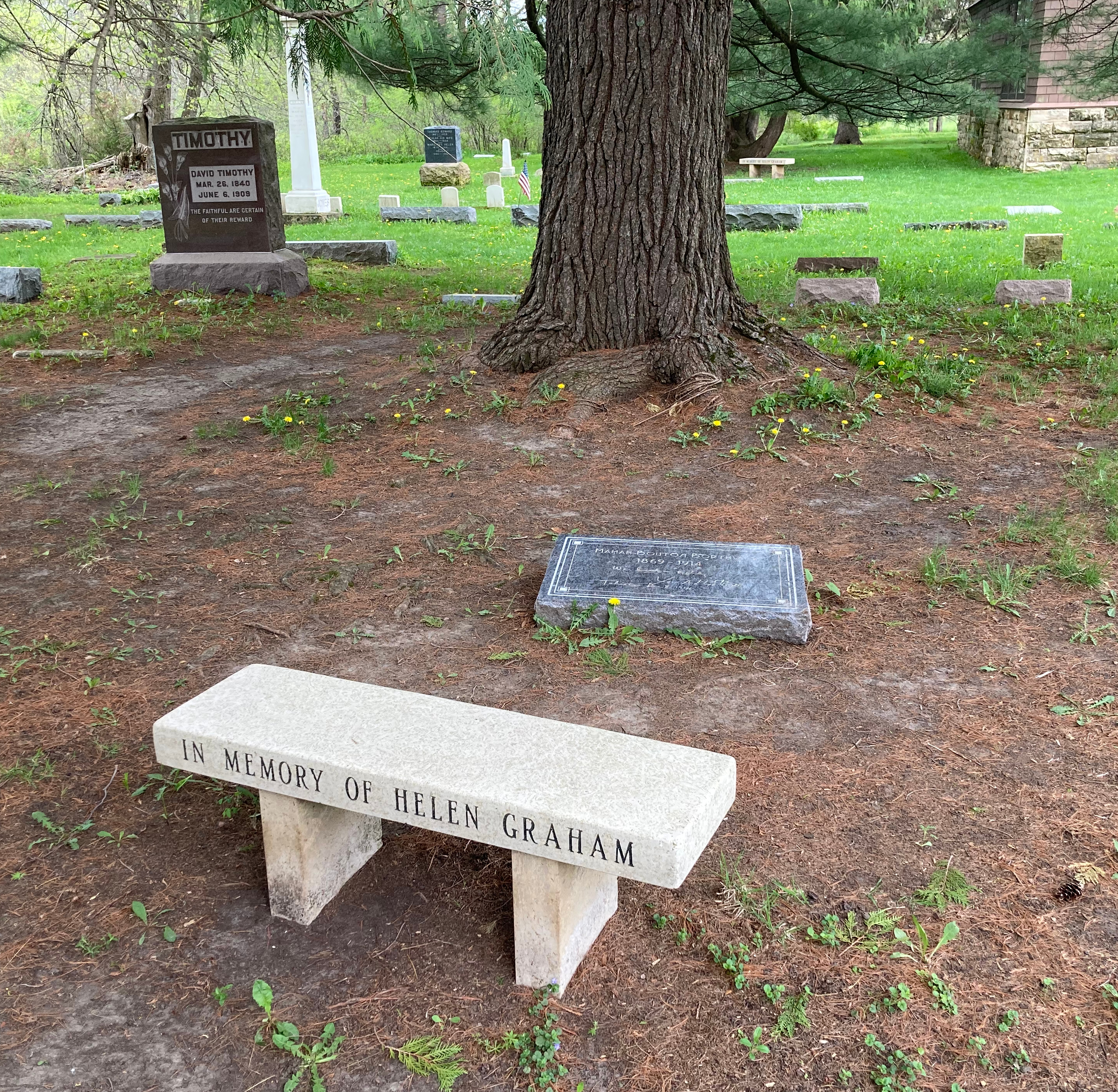
Borthwick's grave at Unity Chapel Cemetery

On August 15, 1914, Julian Carlton, a male servant who had been hired several months earlier, set fire to the living quarters of Taliesin and murdered seven people with a roofing hatchet, or some other type of shingling tool, as they fled the burning structure. The dead included Borthwick and her two children, twelve-year-old John and eight-year-old Martha; David Lindblom, a gardener; Emil Brodelle, a draftsman; Thomas Bunker, a workman; and Ernest Weston, the 14-year-old son of Wright's carpenter William Weston, who himself was injured but survived. Thomas Fritz also survived the mayhem, and Weston helped to put out the fire that almost completely consumed the residential wing of the house. Found hiding in the basement furnace, Carlton had swallowed hydrochloric acid immediately following the attack in an unsuccessful attempt to kill himself. He was nearly lynched on the spot, but was instead taken to the Dodgeville jail. Carlton refused all food in jail and died from starvation seven weeks after the attack, despite medical attention. At the time of the attack, Wright was overseeing work on Midway Gardens in Chicago.

Borthwick was buried in the cemetery at Unity Chapel near Taliesin. Wright was later buried there in 1959, but in 1985 his remains were cremated and reinterred at Taliesin West in Arizona.

== In popular culture ==
A detailed nonfiction account of the tragedy at Taliesin is provided in Death in a Prairie House: Frank Lloyd Wright and the Taliesin Murders by William R. Drennan, published in 2007. A Brave and Lovely Woman: Mamah Borthwick and Frank Lloyd Wright by Mark Borthwick, a distant relative, is a biography of Borthwick published in 2023.

Borthwick's time with Wright is the basis of Loving Frank, a novel by Nancy Horan. Mamah is also a subject of T. C. Boyle's twelfth novel, The Women, published in 2009. The death of Borthwick is described in the book The Rise of Endymion by Dan Simmons in a back-story of the persona of Frank Lloyd Wright.

The opera Shining Brow covers the story of the Cheneys and the Wrights, from when they meet in Wright's office, through the aftermath of Borthwick's death. The opera premiered in 1993 with music by American composer Daron Hagen and a libretto by Paul Muldoon.

A song on Conor Oberst's album Ruminations is named after Borthwick.
