= Frank W. Thomas House =

Historic house in Oak Park, Illinois

- U.S. National Register of Historic Places
- U.S. Historic district – Contributing property
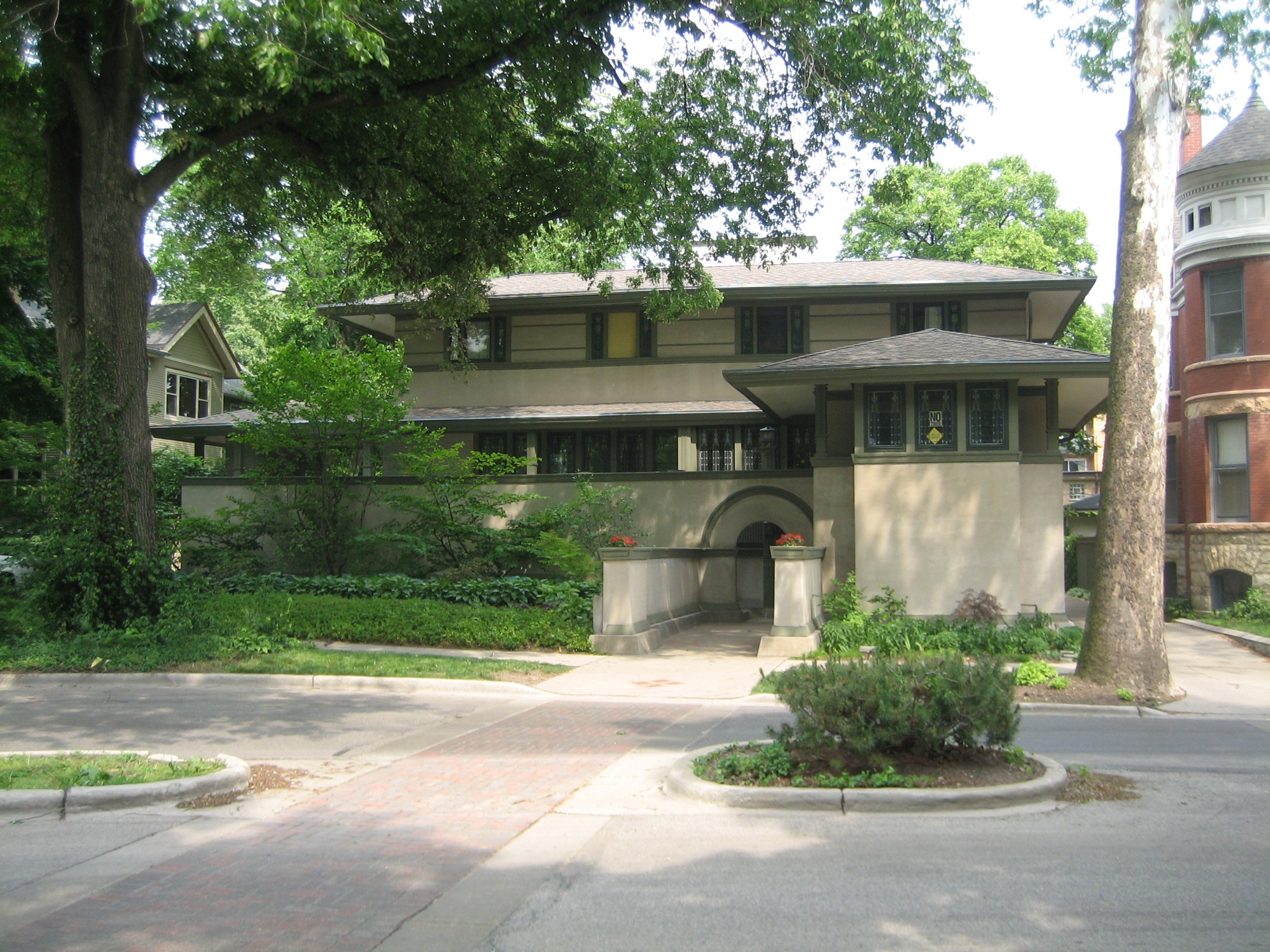

- Location within Illinois Location within the United States
- Location: 210 Forest Ave., Oak Park, Illinois
- Coordinates: 41°53′26″N 87°48′00″W
- Area: 0.3 acres (0.12 ha)
- Built: 1901
- Architect: Frank Lloyd Wright
- Architectural style: Prairie style
- Part of: Frank Lloyd Wright-Prairie School of Architecture Historic District (ID73000699)
- NRHP reference No.: 72000455
- Added to NRHP: September 14, 1972

The Frank W. Thomas House is a historic house located at 210 Forest Avenue in Oak Park, a suburb of Chicago in Illinois, United States. The building was designed by architect Frank Lloyd Wright in 1901 and cast in the Wright-developed Prairie School of Architecture. By Wright's own definition, this was the first of the Prairie houses - the rooms are elevated, and there is no basement. The house also includes many of the features which became associated with the style, such as a low roof with broad overhangs, casement windows, built-in shelves and cabinets, ornate leaded glass windows and central hearths/fireplaces. Tallmadge & Watson, a Chicago firm that became part of the Prairie School of Architects, added an addition to the rear of the house in 1923.

On September 14, 1972, the Frank Thomas House was added to the U.S. National Register of Historic Places.

== Gallery ==
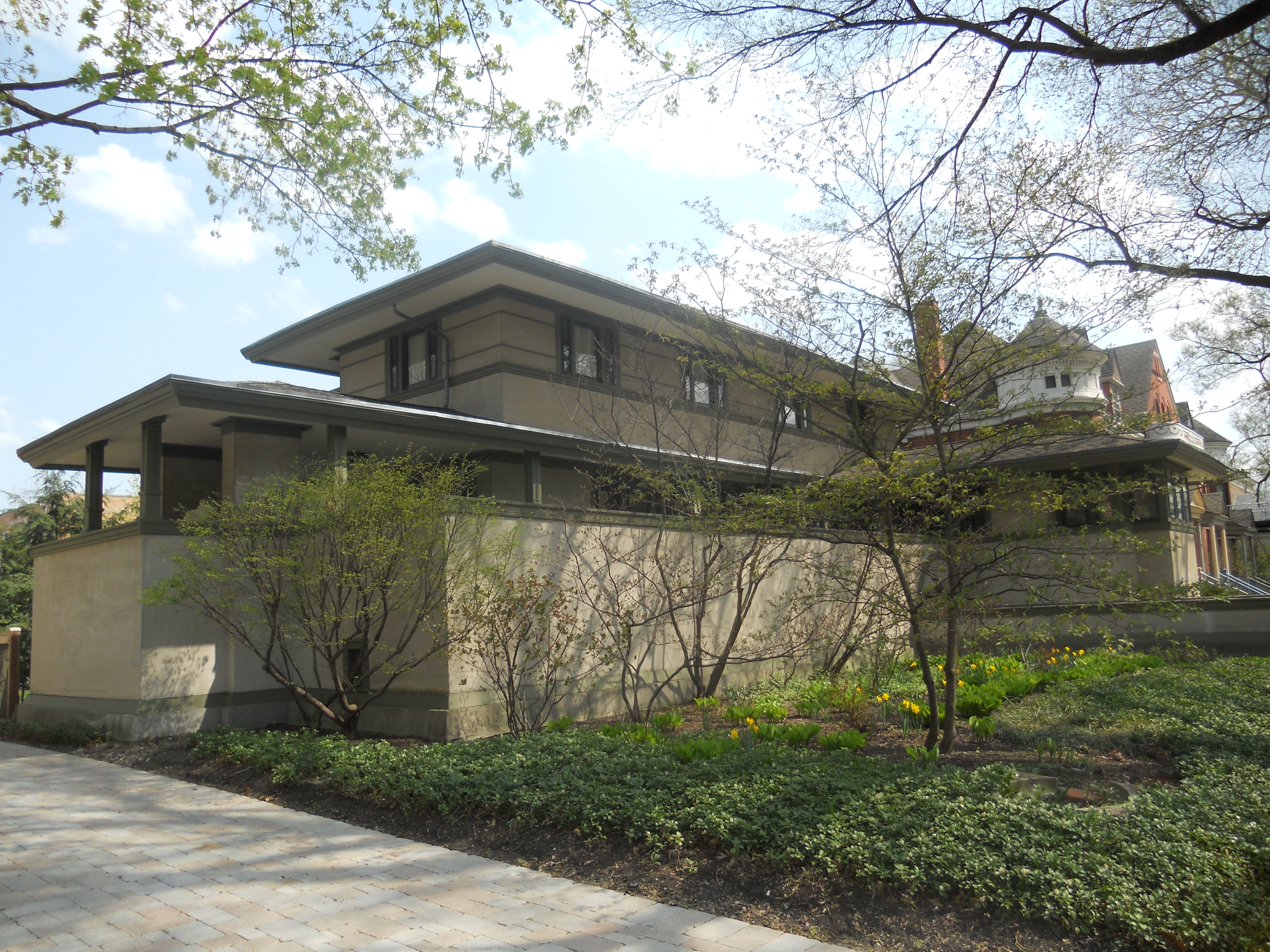
Frank W. Thomas House (1901), by Frank Lloyd Wright

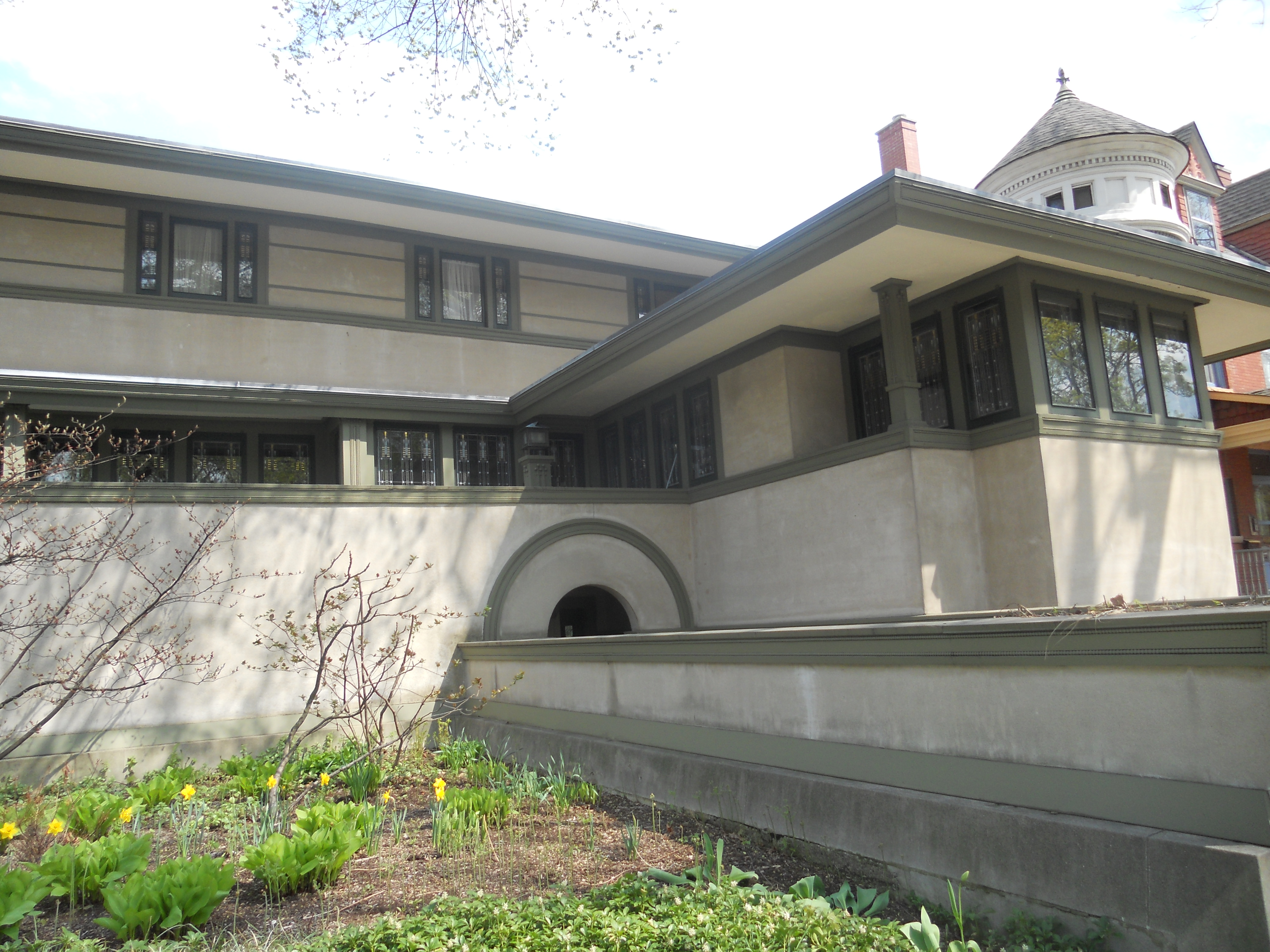
Frank W. Thomas House (1901)

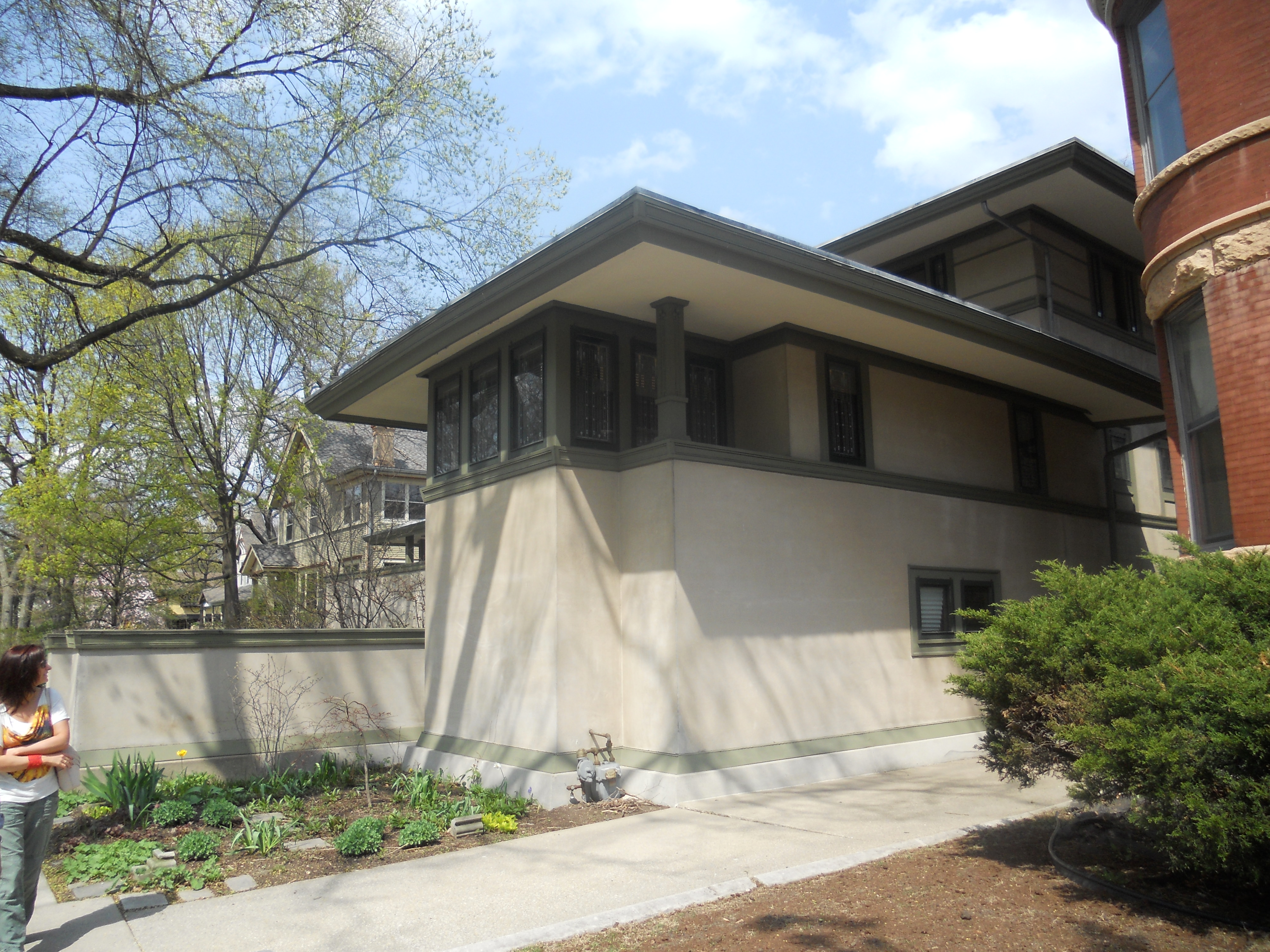
Frank W. Thomas House (1901), 210 Forest Avenue, Oak Park, IL

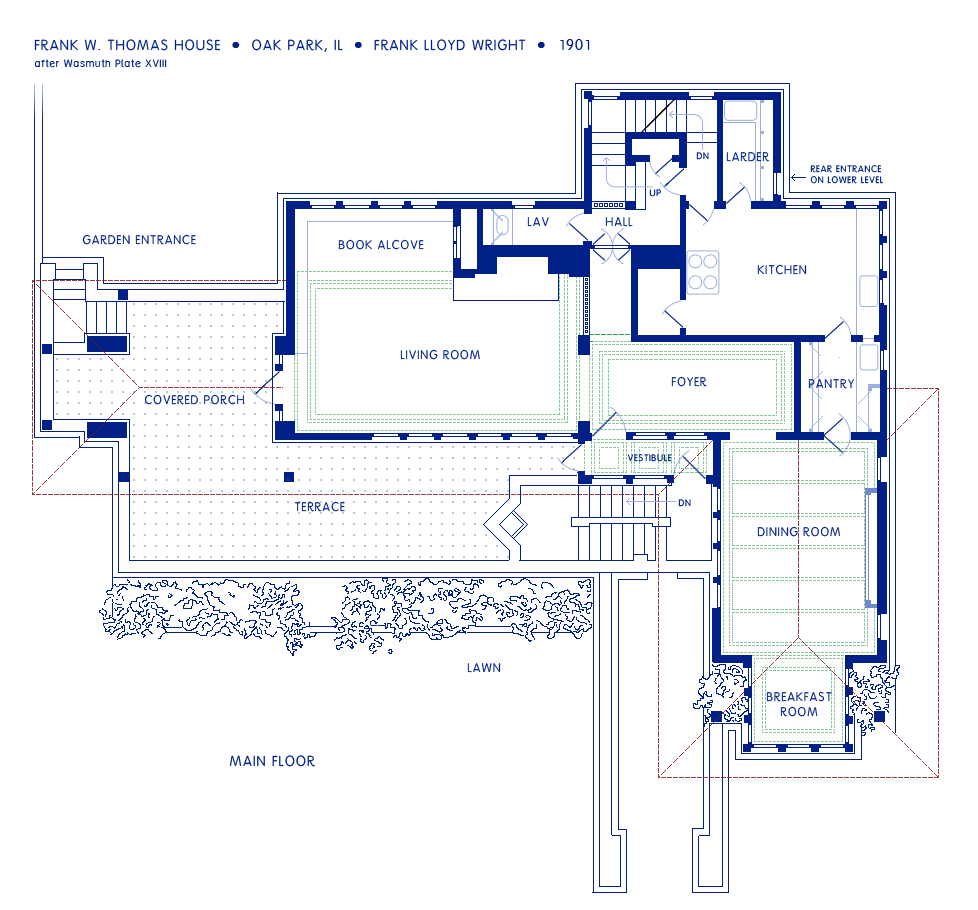
Main floor plan

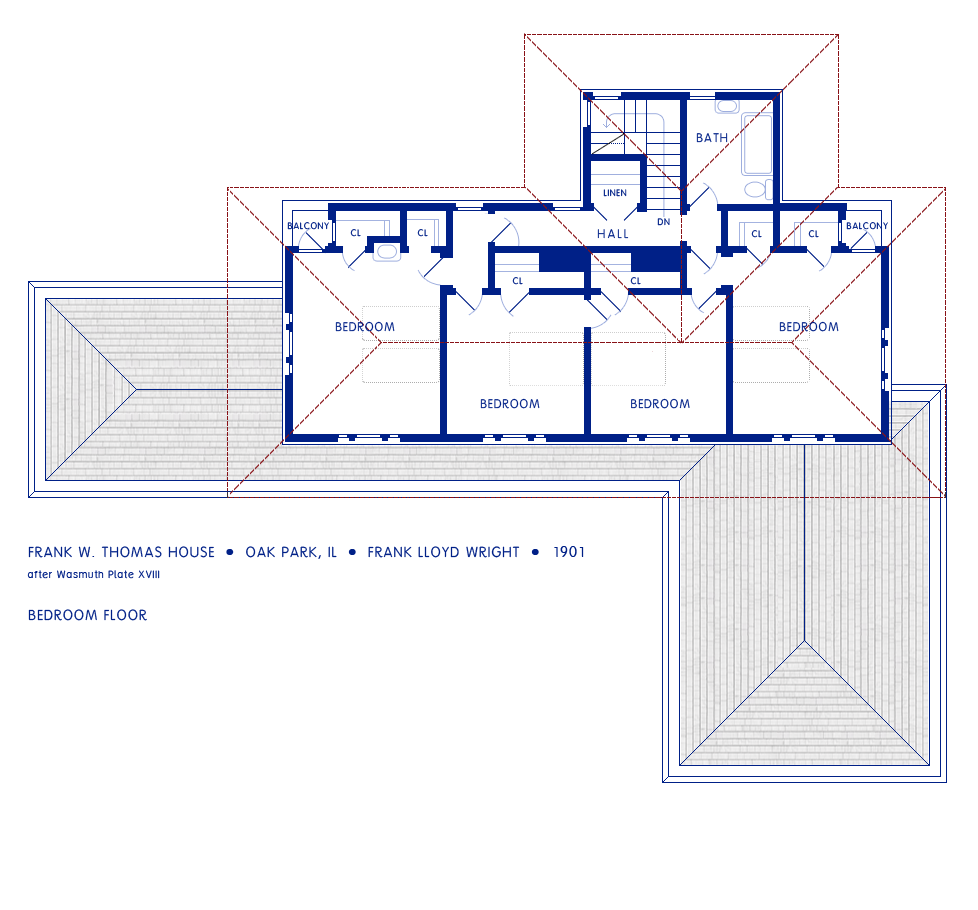
Bedroom floor plan

== See also ==
- List of Frank Lloyd Wright works
- National Register of Historic Places listings in Cook County, Illinois
