= Edwin H. Cheney House =

Historic house in Oak Park, Illinois

- U.S. Historic district – Contributing property
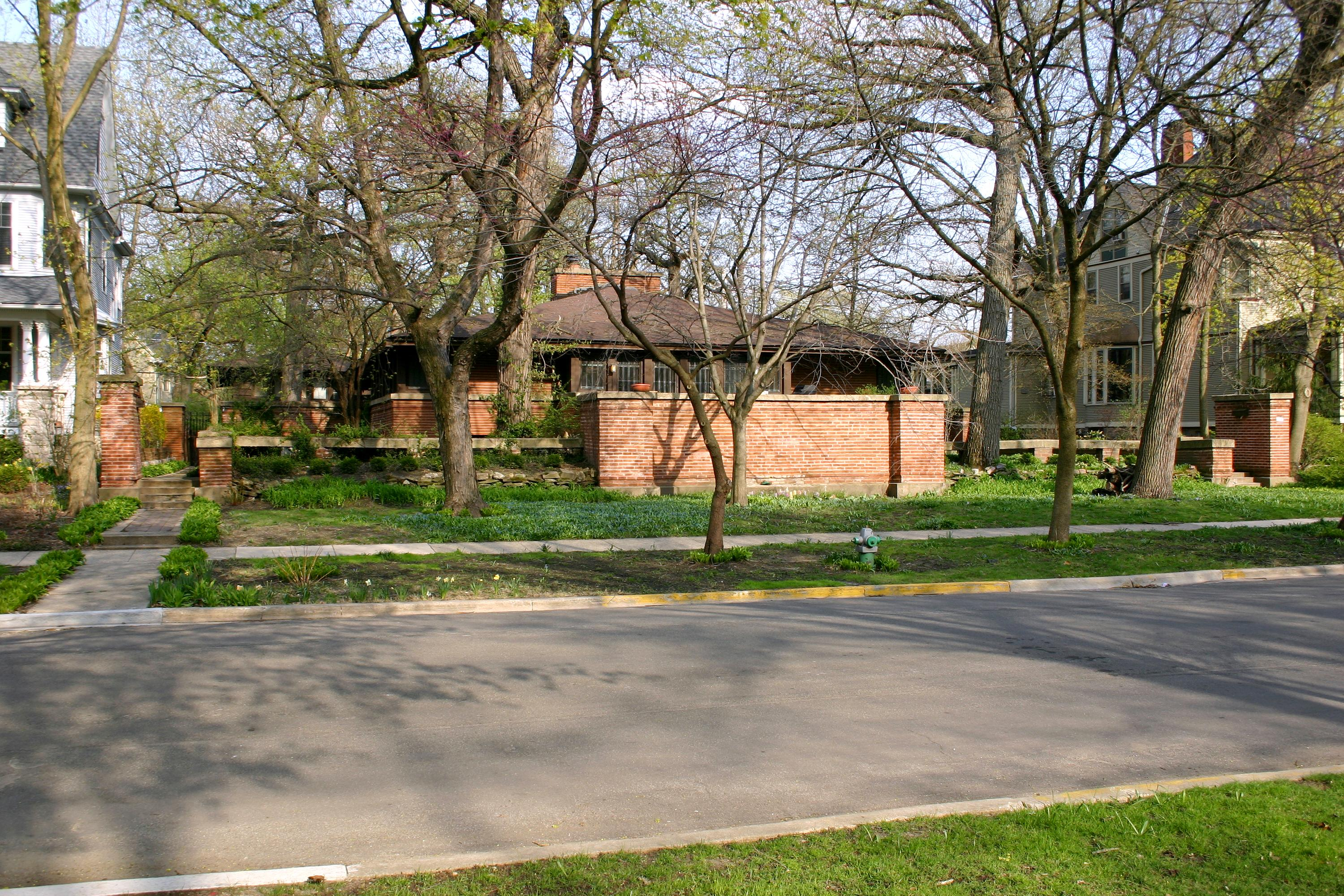

- Location within Illinois Location within the United States
- Interactive map showing the location of Edwin H. Cheney House
- Location: 520 North East Avenue, Oak Park, Illinois
- Coordinates: 41.895072°N 87.789585°W
- Architect: Frank Lloyd Wright
- Architectural style: Prairie School
- Part of: Frank Lloyd Wright-Prairie School of Architecture Historic District (ID73000699)
- Added to NRHP: December 4, 1973

Edwin H. Cheney House is a home in Oak Park, a suburb of Chicago, Illinois, United States. Built in 1903, it was designed by Frank Lloyd Wright for electrical engineer Edwin Cheney. The house is part of the Frank Lloyd Wright–Prairie School of Architecture Historic District. A brick house with the living and sleeping rooms all on one floor under a single hipped roof, the Cheney House has a less monumental and more intimate quality than the design for the Arthur Heurtley House. The intimacy of the Cheney house is due to the building not being a full story off the ground and being sequestered from the main street by a walled terrace. In addition, its windows are nestled between the wide eaves of the roof and the substantial stone sill that girdles the house.

The living rooms, which take up the entire front of the house and open onto the walled terrace at the center, are trimmed in fir. Together they form a single longitudinal space under a continuous ceiling carried up in the form of a hip roof, the whole subdivided into dining room, living room, and library by wooden posts and cabinets. The basement features a large in-law suite.

It was this commission that precipitated the love affair between Wright, and Edwin's wife, Mamah Cheney (née Borthwick), the climax of which occurred in 1909 when Wright abandoned his architectural practice and left with Mrs. Cheney for a year in Europe. This era of Wright's life ended in 1914 when the former Mrs. Cheney (by then divorced, and legally Mamah Borthwick), her children, and four others, were murdered at Taliesin by an insane servant.

== See also ==
- List of Frank Lloyd Wright works
