= Paul Gapp =

American journalist

- Born: June 26, 1928; Cleveland, Ohio
- Died: July 30, 1992 (aged 64); Chicago, Illinois
- Education: Ohio University (BA)
- Occupation: Architecture critic

Paul Gapp (June 26, 1928 – July 30, 1992) was an architecture critic for the Chicago Tribune. He won the Pulitzer Prize for criticism in 1979.

== Early life and education ==
Born in Cleveland on June 26, 1928, Gapp graduated from Ohio University in 1950 with a Bachelor of Science degree in journalism.

== Professional career ==
From 1950 until 1956, Gapp worked for The Columbus Dispatch. From 1956 until 1966, Gapp was a reporter and editor for the Chicago Daily News.

Between 1966 and 1972, Gapp worked as an account executive for a Chicago public-relations firm and directed the Urban Journalism Fellowship Program at the University of Chicago. He also served as the executive director of both the Chicago Chapter and the Illinois Council of the American Institute of Architects.

In 1972, Gapp joined the Chicago Tribune as its assistant city editor for urban affairs. In 1974, he became the paper's architecture critic, a post he held until his death in 1992.

== Work as architecture critic ==
Gapp's stock in trade was reporting on and analyzing urban architecture, both as a design form and also as a political and social force in the life of Chicago. He described the city as "a sprawling, muscular, free-wheeling, big-spending, bragging, bustling, exciting go-to-hell town." He also termed Chicago "the last of the great American cities, a city of great elegance and great charm."

In his criticism, Gapp called Water Tower Place, a Chicago skyscraper, "an animated mausoleum," and he used the term "lakefront marauders" to characterize the combination of politicians, engineers and developers that threatened to convert the renovated Navy Pier in Chicago into a commercial collection of "fern bars, cookie stores and bourgeois boutiques." "I do not challenge the integrity of any of these people, who will soon begin quietly stacking one informal decision on top of another," Gapp wrote about Navy Pier in 1989. "I fear, however, that some of them have no comprehension of the old-fashioned value system that gave Chicago and other cities their great parks, waterfront promenades and other centers of summertime entertainment. Furthermore, too many people have been brainwashed into believing that big business is unfailingly capable of enhancing urban life if it is allowed to build enough colorful bazaars offer fancy consumer goods and services. Developers of property in picturesque locations seem to be regarded as selfless candidates for beatification."

In his later years, Gapp offered up generous praise for several new skyscrapers constructed in Chicago. In 1989, he called Chicago's NBC Tower "the best-looking masonry-clad skyscraper constructed in Chicago since the 1930s," and noted that its "crisp, shimmering, almost mesmerizing presence on the skyline is a triumph of good taste, skillful detailing and a mature respect for architectural history that sidesteps the tiresome cosmetics of Postmodernism." Gapp also called the AT&T Corporate Center in Chicago "equally resplendent." However, he generally criticized Chicago's building boom of the 1980s, writing just before his death that "large numbers of nondescript, mediocre, and uncomely buildings dominated the rest of the boom, including most of the late additions to the banal Illinois Center complex east of Michigan Avenue....Reviewing the burst of downtown growth in the last decade, then, one can only declare that the unevenness of design quality has been sharply disappointing."

== Pulitzer Prize ==
On April 16, 1979, Gapp won the Pulitzer Prize for "distinguished criticism" for columns written during 1978. In one September 1978 column, Gapp noted that despite Chicago's broad assortment of architecturally significant buildings, no tour existed that covered all 46 of Chicago's official landmarks and historic sites. So, Gapp took readers on such a tour, on paper. In another column during 1978, Gapp visited Chicago hotel lobbies, where visitors often receive their first impression of a city. He called the then-new Marriott Hotel "a touch of crass" whose four-story atrium lobby contained "enough jammed-in furniture to accommodate the 82d Airborne Division in full battle dress."

== Death ==
Gapp spent three years battling cancer and emphysema before his death in Chicago on July 30, 1992.

== Personal life ==
Gapp's first wife, the former Florence Mraz, died in 2012. He is survived by their children, Leslie Sharp and Steve Gapp, and three grandchildren. His second wife, Mary Joan, died in February, 2021. app.

Gapp was an avid philatelist, and from 1973 until 1981 wrote a column on stamp collecting for the Tribune under the pseudonym Helmuth Conrad. He discontinued the column in 1981, the Tribune wrote, "because of other obligations and demands on his time."
