= Laura Gale House =

Historic house in Oak Park, Illinois

- Mrs. Thomas H. Gale House
- U.S. National Register of Historic Places
- U.S. Historic district – Contributing property
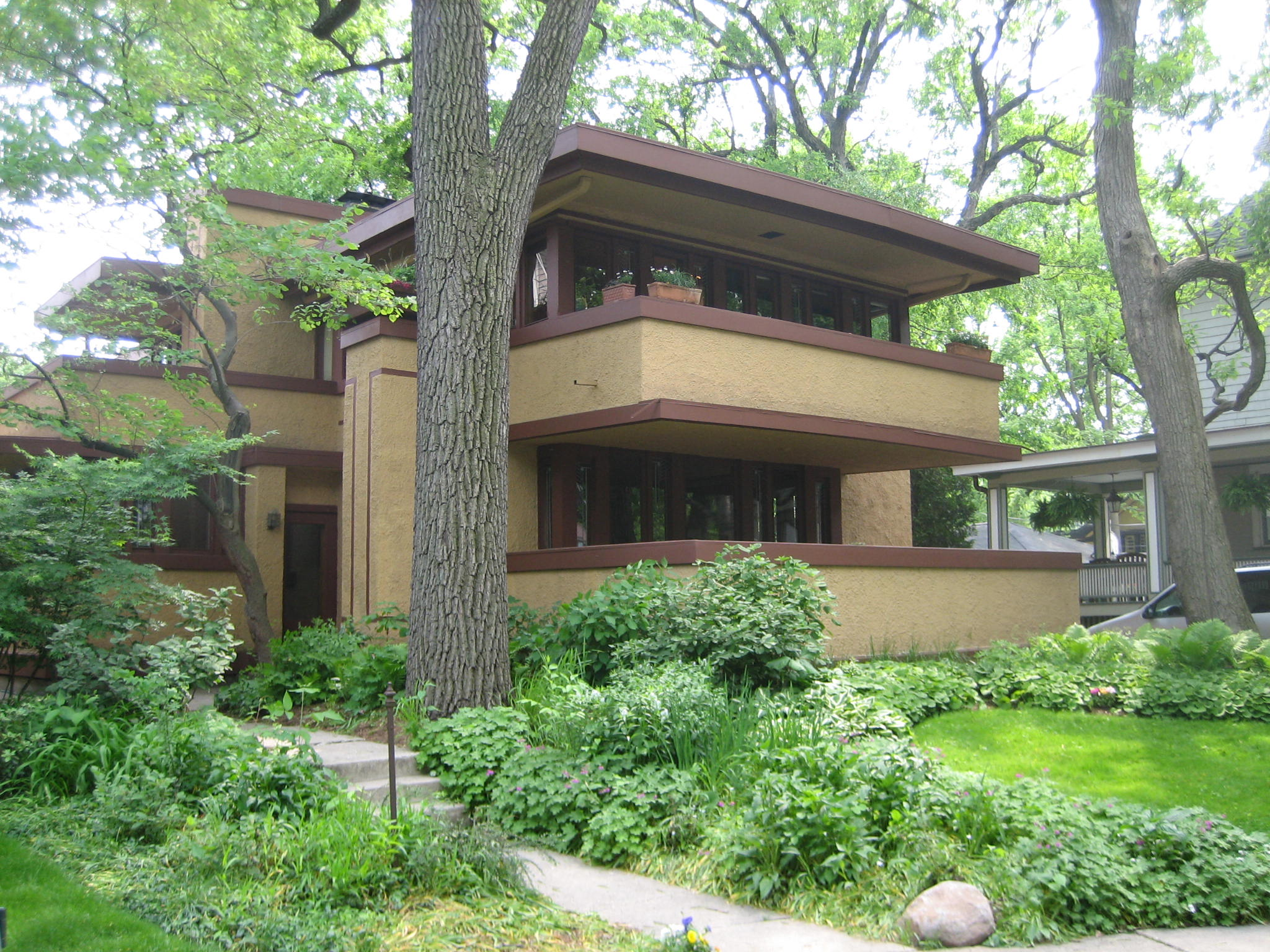

- Location within Illinois Location within the United States
- Location: 6 Elizabeth Court, Oak Park, Cook County, Illinois
- Coordinates: 41°53′30″N 87°47′56″W
- Area: 0.1 acres (0.040 ha)
- Built: 1909
- Architect: Frank Lloyd Wright
- Architectural style: Prairie
- Part of: Frank Lloyd Wright-Prairie School of Architecture Historic District (ID73000699)
- NRHP reference No.: 70000239
- Added to NRHP: March 5, 1970

The Laura Gale House, also known as the Mrs. Thomas H. Gale House, is a home in Oak Park, a suburb of Chicago, Illinois, United States. The house was designed by master architect Frank Lloyd Wright and built in 1909. It is located within the boundaries of the Frank Lloyd Wright-Prairie School of Architecture Historic District and has been listed on the U.S. National Register of Historic Places since March 5, 1970.

== History ==
Laura R. Gale, widow of realtor Thomas Gale, commissioned Frank Lloyd Wright to design the house on Elizabeth Court in 1909. This was not the first time that the Gale family utilized Wright. The architect had designed two houses on Chicago Avenue in Oak Park, two of Wright's "bootleg" houses, for the Gales. The Gale House was designed during Wright's most productive Prairie style period and has been cited by architectural "authorities" as a milestone in the development of early modern architecture. The house was occupied by its original owner until 1962 when architect Howard Rosenwinkel purchased it and undertook a meticulous restoration. The current owners of the house are Andrea Kayne and Andrew C. Mead.

== Architecture ==
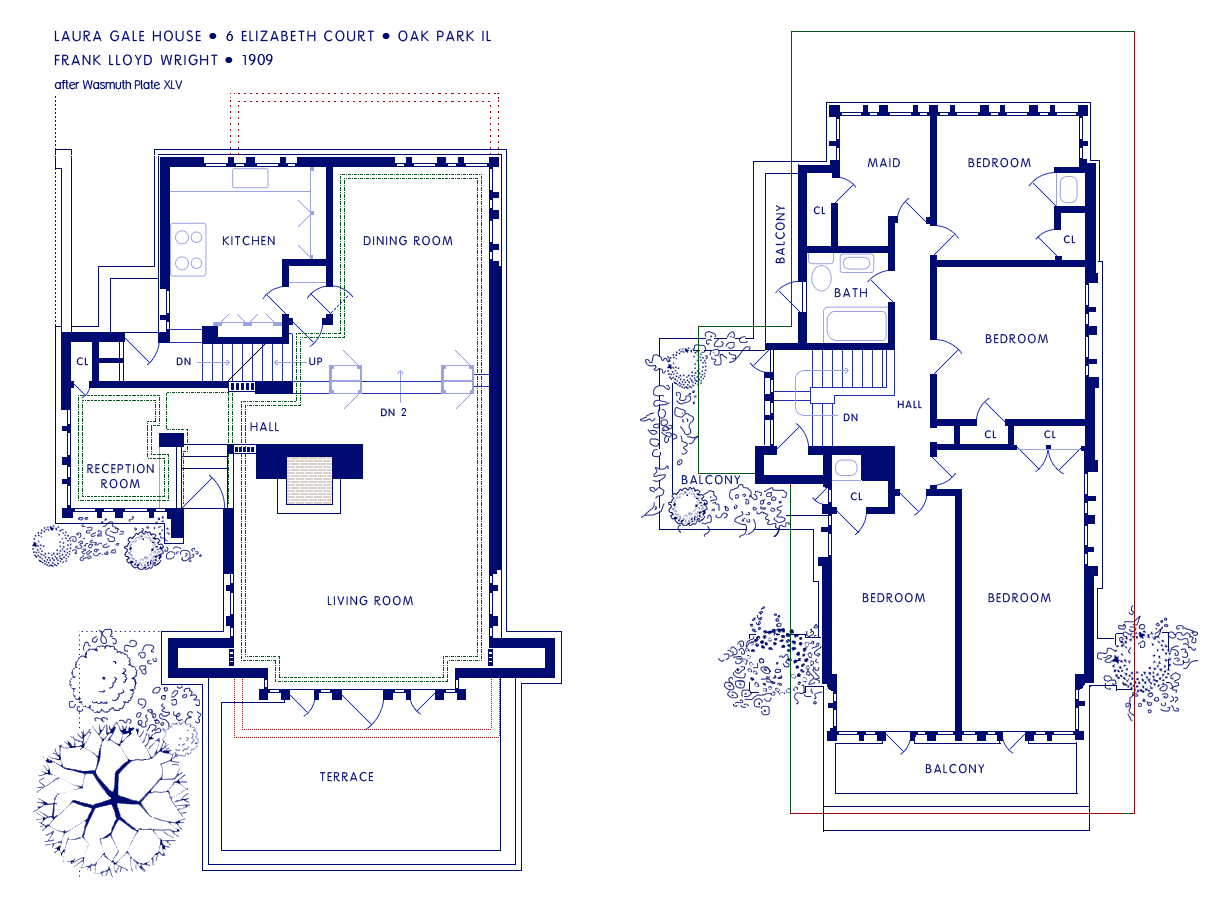
Floor plan.

The house was designed by the American architect Frank Lloyd Wright in his own Prairie style. Through his use of abstract geometrical shapes in the detail and mass of the house Wright may have anticipated and inspired the modern European architects of the 1920s. The house is considered one of Wright's most unusual designs from his years in Oak Park, Illinois. It is compact and made up of interlocking rectilinear forms which surround a fireplace at its center. The extreme rectilinear shapes and masses on the home's exterior are represented in none of Wright's other works either before or after the completion of the Gale House. However, the home's interior was similar to that of the Walser House in Chicago and the Barton House in Buffalo, New York.

== Significance ==
The Mrs. Thomas H. Gale House is listed on the National Register of Historic Places as well as being listed a contributing property to the Frank Lloyd Wright-Prairie School of Architecture Historic District. The home is considered one of Wright's most successful small house designs and the forerunner to several other important Prairie style, Wright-designed homes which culminated with the completion of Fallingwater in Mill Run, Pennsylvania, in 1936.

== See also ==
- List of Frank Lloyd Wright works
