= Scoville Park =

Public park in Oak Park, Illinois

Coordinates: 41°53′22″N 87°47′42″W

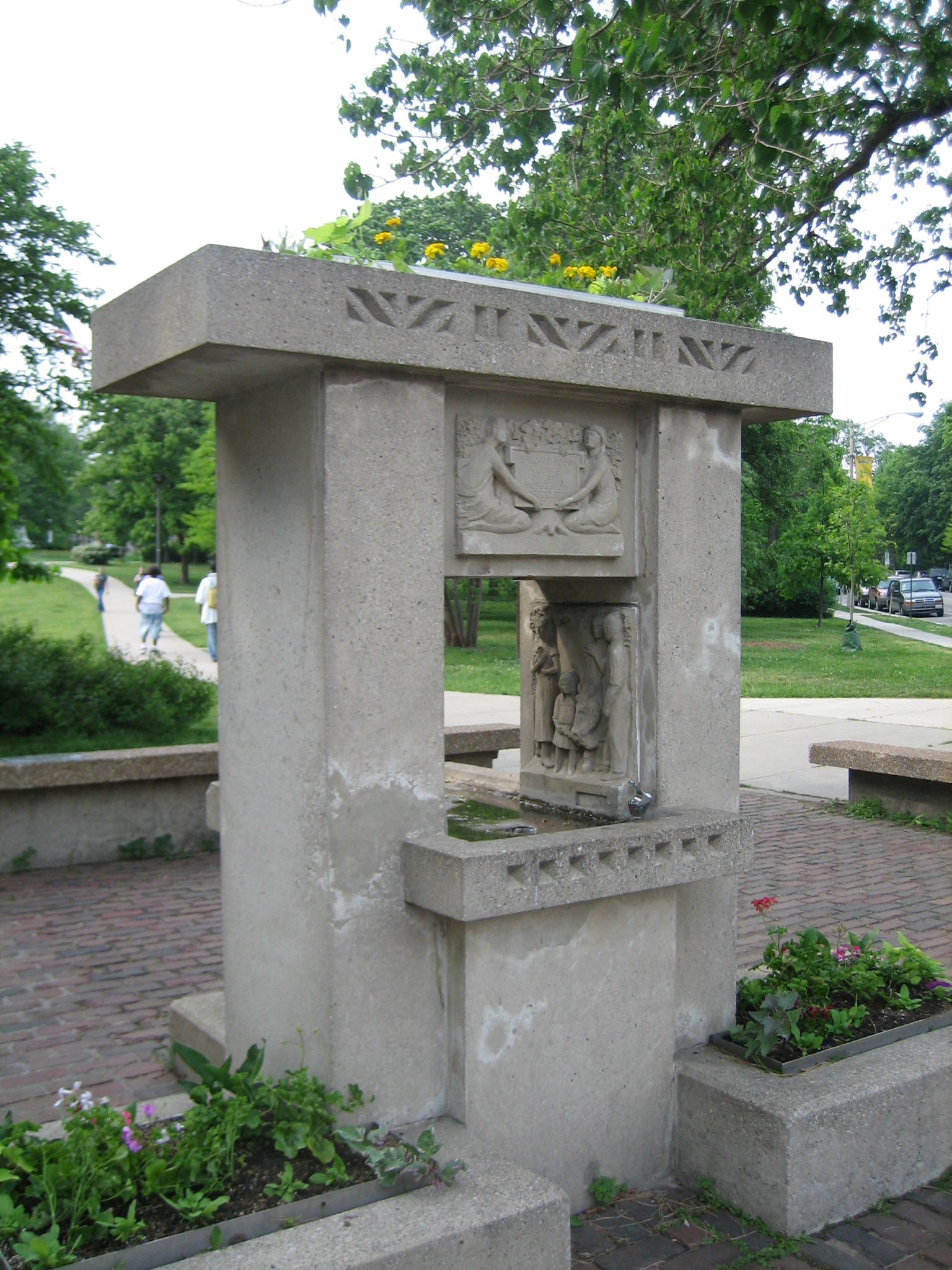
Horse Show Fountain replica in the southeast corner of the park

Scoville Park is a public park in Oak Park, Illinois. Designed by the Danish-American landscape architect Jens Jensen, the park is located at the corner of Lake Street and Oak Park Avenue in the town's central Hemingway District, next to the Oak Park Public Library. The park is home to a war memorial for local veterans of World War I titled Peace Triumphant, the replica Horse Show Fountain, a meadow that hosts summer concerts and other village events, and a playground and tennis courts. The park was added to the National Register of Historic Places in 2002.

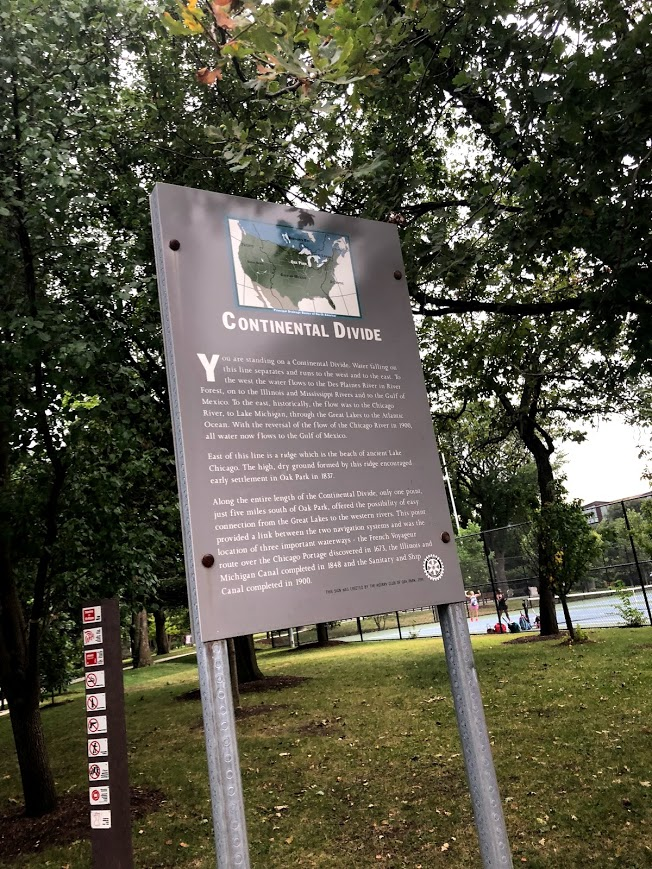
A historical marker signifying the St. Lawrence Divide, which runs through Scoville Park

== History ==
Joseph Kettlestrings, the first white settler in the area that became Oak Park, acquired 173 acres (70 ha) of land from the federal government in 1833, including the area that is now Scoville Park. A plaque marking the spot of his second home is located in Scoville Park's southwest corner, near the library, although recent research indicates the house may have been farther west, just south and east of the present-day intersection of Harlem Avenue and Lake Street.

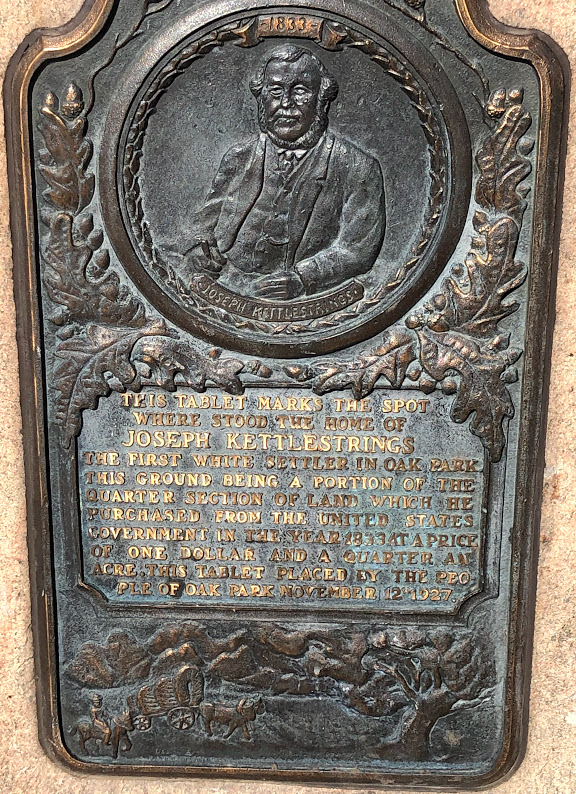
Monument to Joseph Kettlestrings

In 1855, James Scoville bought the land that would become the park from Kettlestrings. He built his estate, including a large white mansion, at the site of what is now the location of the park's Peace Triumphant statue, atop a ridge that marks a continental divide between the St. Lawrence River and Mississippi River basins. Scoville later donated money to create the Scoville Institute, which eventually became the Oak Park Public Library, on land immediately next door to his house.

Amid plans to convert Scoville's estate into a hotel, the Park District of Oak Park was created in 1912 and, as its first purchase, it bought the property for $135,637. In 1913, the Scoville home was demolished and Jens Jensen drafted plans for the park.

Scoville Park underwent piecemeal changes over the years. It was renovated in 2012–2013 to make the park more open and align it more closely with Jensen's original plan. In November 2018, developers announced plans for a 28-story high-rise immediately across the street from the park; the prospect of a high rise worried some that the building and its shadow would negatively impact both Scoville Park and the nearby Unity Temple, a Frank Lloyd Wright masterpiece. The plans were officially withdrawn in March 2019.

== Horse Show Fountain ==
The Horse Show Fountain, a 1969 replica of the 1909 original, is located at the park's entrance at the corner of Lake and Oak Park. The fountain is also known as the Wright-Bock Fountain, as the original is generally believed to be the product of sculptor Richard Bock and architect Frank Lloyd Wright. The fountain was built by the local Horse Show Foundation to serve not only people, but also horses and dogs.

The fountain was originally located 100 feet (30 m) to the west, on the curb at Lake Street, in front of the wrought-iron fence that surrounded the Scoville mansion and later served as the park boundaries. By the 1960s the fountain was deteriorating, so a replica was built with entirely new materials, and it was placed about 100 feet east, at the corner of the park. The fountain's original inscription was lost to history during the restoration. The new fountain was dedicated on June 8, 1969, on what was then believed to be the 100th anniversary of Frank Lloyd Wright's birth (he is now believed to have been two years older).

== Oak Park River Forest War Memorial ==
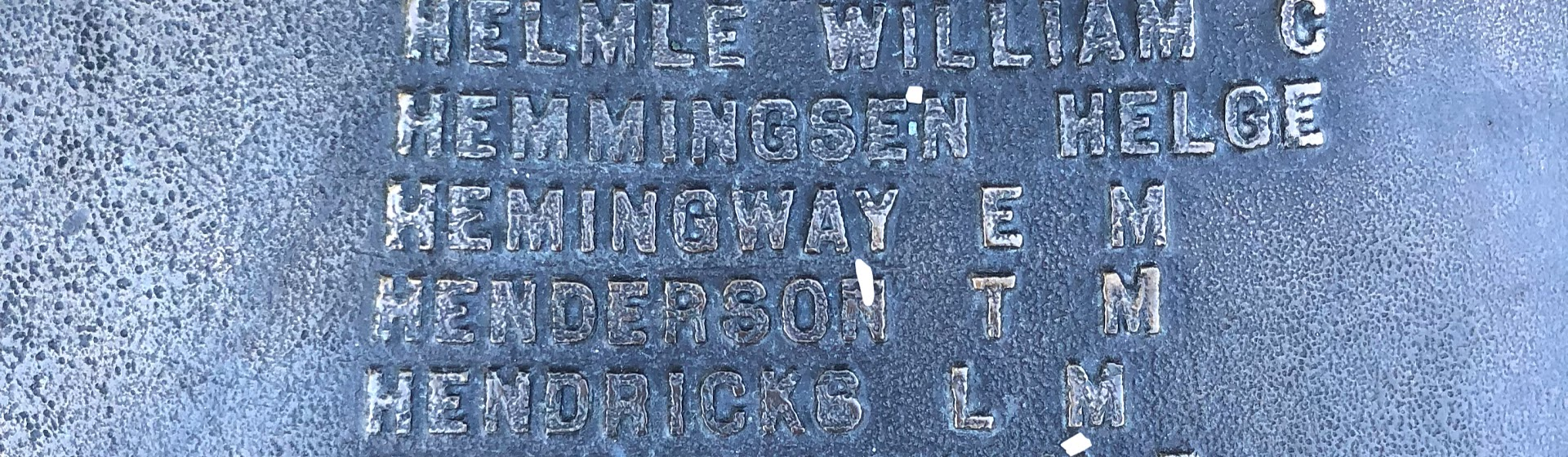
Ernest Hemingway's name on the Peace Triumphant statue

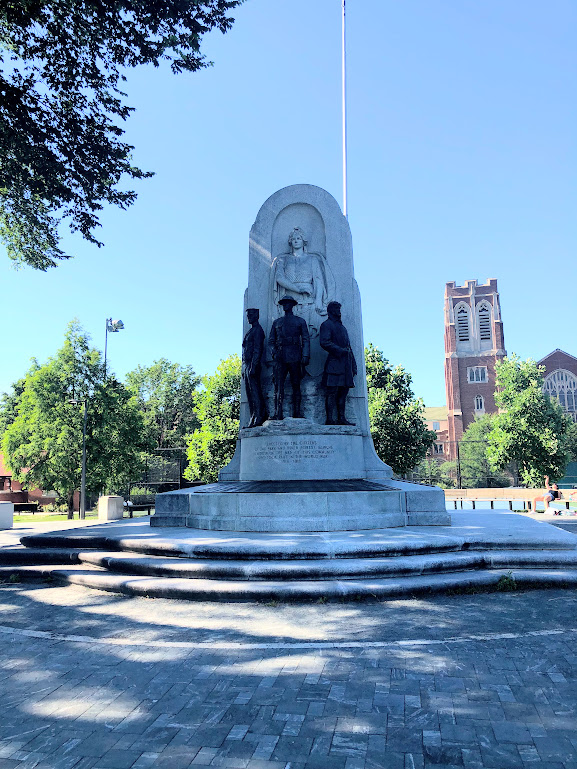
Peace Triumphant in 2018. The female figure in the center is Columbia.

The Oak Park-River Forest War Memorial, known as Peace Triumphant, is a memorial to the veterans of World War I located at the top of the hill on the park's north end. The monument was erected in 1925 by citizens of Oak Park and neighboring River Forest, who donated the $52,573.63 needed to build the granite and bronze monument to community members who fought in the war. The monument includes three bronze statues, representing the armed forces of land, sea, and air. The monument includes the names of 2,446 residents who served in World War I from Oak Park and River Forest, including Ernest Hemingway, who grew up nearby and sledded down the hill as a boy. Vice President Charles G. Dawes attended the dedication, on Armistice Day 1925.

Peace Triumphant was restored in 2009–10. The foundations of James Scoville's house were discovered beneath the statue during its restoration in 2010.

== Percy Julian Bust ==
A bust of Percy Julian, the chemist, humanitarian, and long-time Oak Park resident, was unveiled in 2003, close to the library on the park's west end. It was commissioned by the Institute for Science Education and Technology.
