= Horse Show Fountain =

Fountain in Oak Park, Illinois

Coordinates: 41.888757°N 87.794679°W

- Year: 1909
- Medium: Sculpture

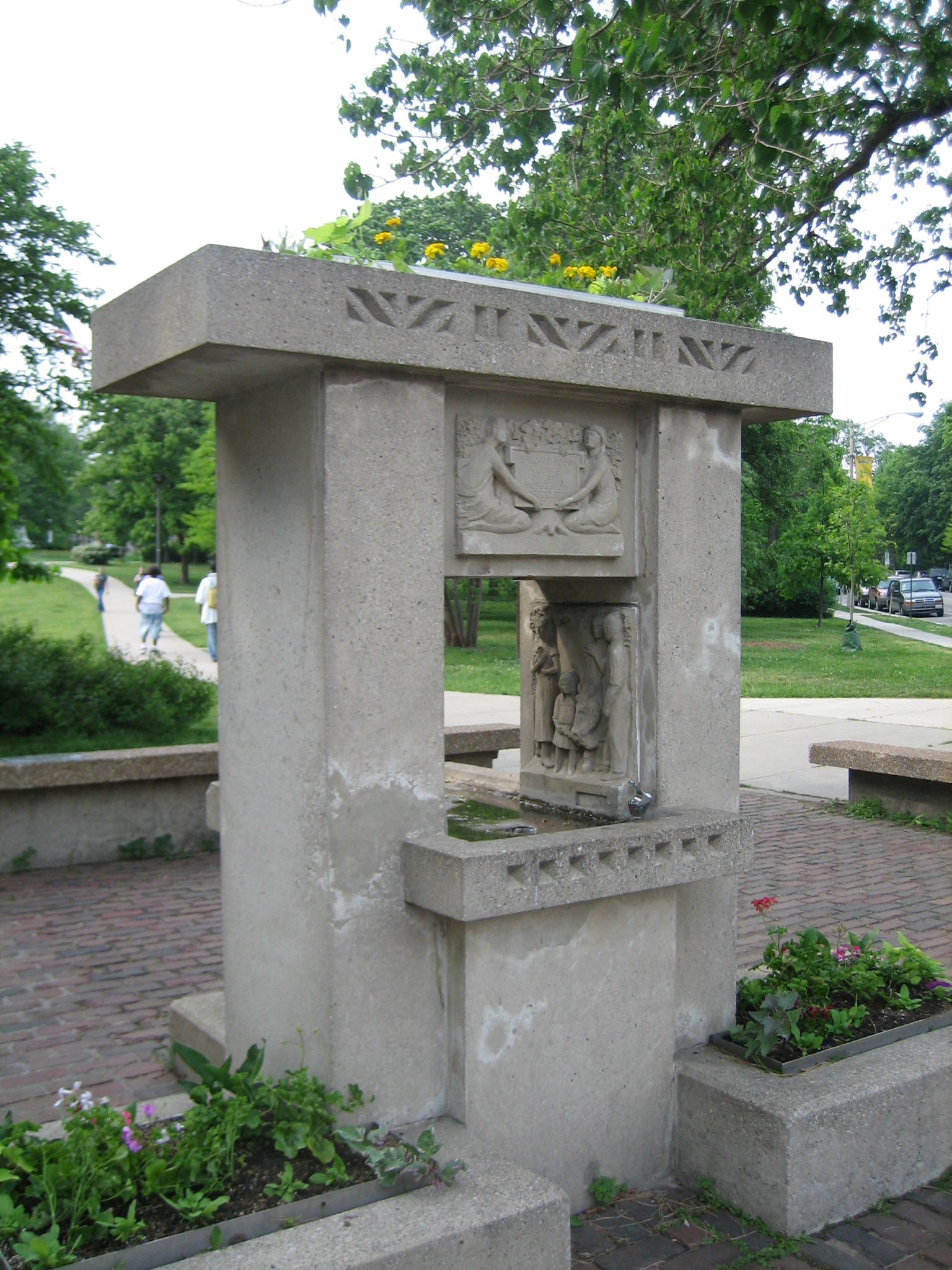
The replica Horse Show Fountain in Oak Park, Illinois

The Horse Show Fountain, also known as the Wright-Bock Fountain, is located in Oak Park, a suburb of Chicago, Illinois, United States. The fountain, first erected in 1909, has been widely attributed to both sculptor Richard Bock and architect Frank Lloyd Wright. Though the fountain currently stands at the corner of Oak Park Avenue and Lake Street within Scoville Park, neither the fountain nor the location is original. Its original location was 100 ft (30 m) from its present location, and the fountain was completely reconstructed in 1969 to replace the badly deteriorated original. The 4.6-acre (19,000 m^{2}) Scoville Park is listed as a historic district in the U.S. National Register of Historic Places, but the fountain – because it is a replica – is considered a non-contributing property to the listing.

== History ==
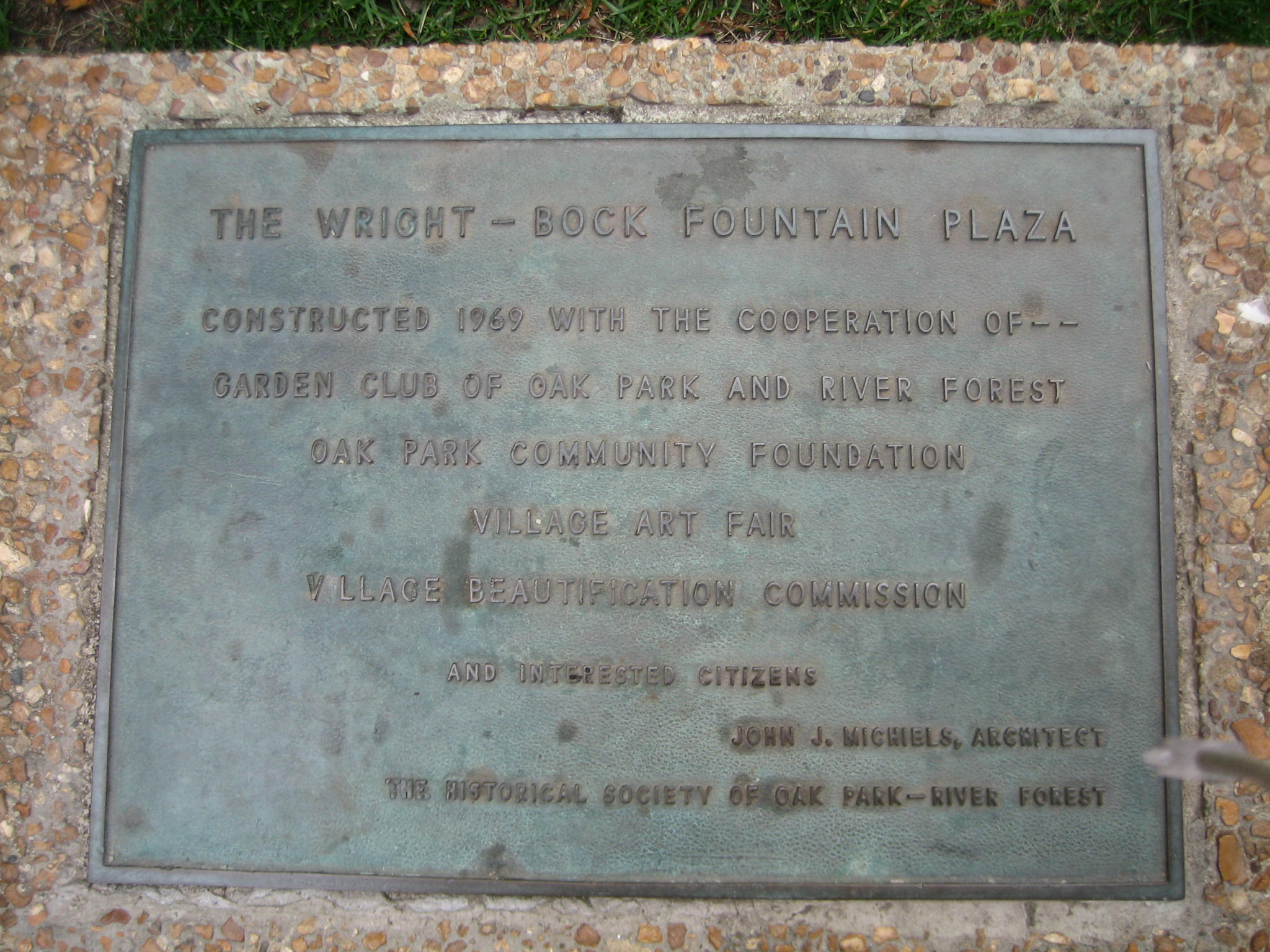
This plaque commemorates the reconstruction of the fountain in 1969.

The Wright-Bock Fountain was originally built by the Oak Park Horse Show Association in 1909 and located on the curb of Lake Street, 100 feet (30.48 m) from its present location. The fountain was built to serve not only people but horses and dogs as well. The fountain's design is generally believed to be a product of sculptor Richard Bock but the actual attribution is a bit fuzzy. Donald P. Hallmark, a Bock historian, stated the fountain was designed by Bock between 1907 and 1908 but with the help of famous architect Frank Lloyd Wright. Bock did much of Wright's architectural sculpture and worked, for a time, in Wright's studio in Oak Park as well. It was Bock himself who suggested that it was Wright who pushed for the central opening in the fountain, and thus he "began to lay claim to the whole project." The Frank Lloyd Wright Foundation claims the work as a Wright design from 1903. The Frank Lloyd Wright Trust lists Wright as the architect and Bock as the sculptor.

In 1969 the badly deteriorated original fountain was reconstructed, with the replica placed in Scoville Park at the corner of Oak Park Ave. and Lake Street in Oak Park. Its new location was an area paved with brick and flanked by concrete benches. During the reconstruction the original materials that comprised the fountain were replaced in their entirety. The poured concrete elements of the fountain were replaced with a concrete that had a rough aggregate finish. The reconstruction work was overseen by the Oak Park Beautification Commission. John Michiels, an architect with Perkins and Will, designed the reconstruction while local sculptor Gerald Jaquard replicated Bock's relief work. Alterations on the original design included lining the planters with zinc and the installation of the recessed lights. During the reconstruction, the original inscription (from the original fountain on the facade that now bears the reconstruction-dedication panel) was lost to history.

== Design ==
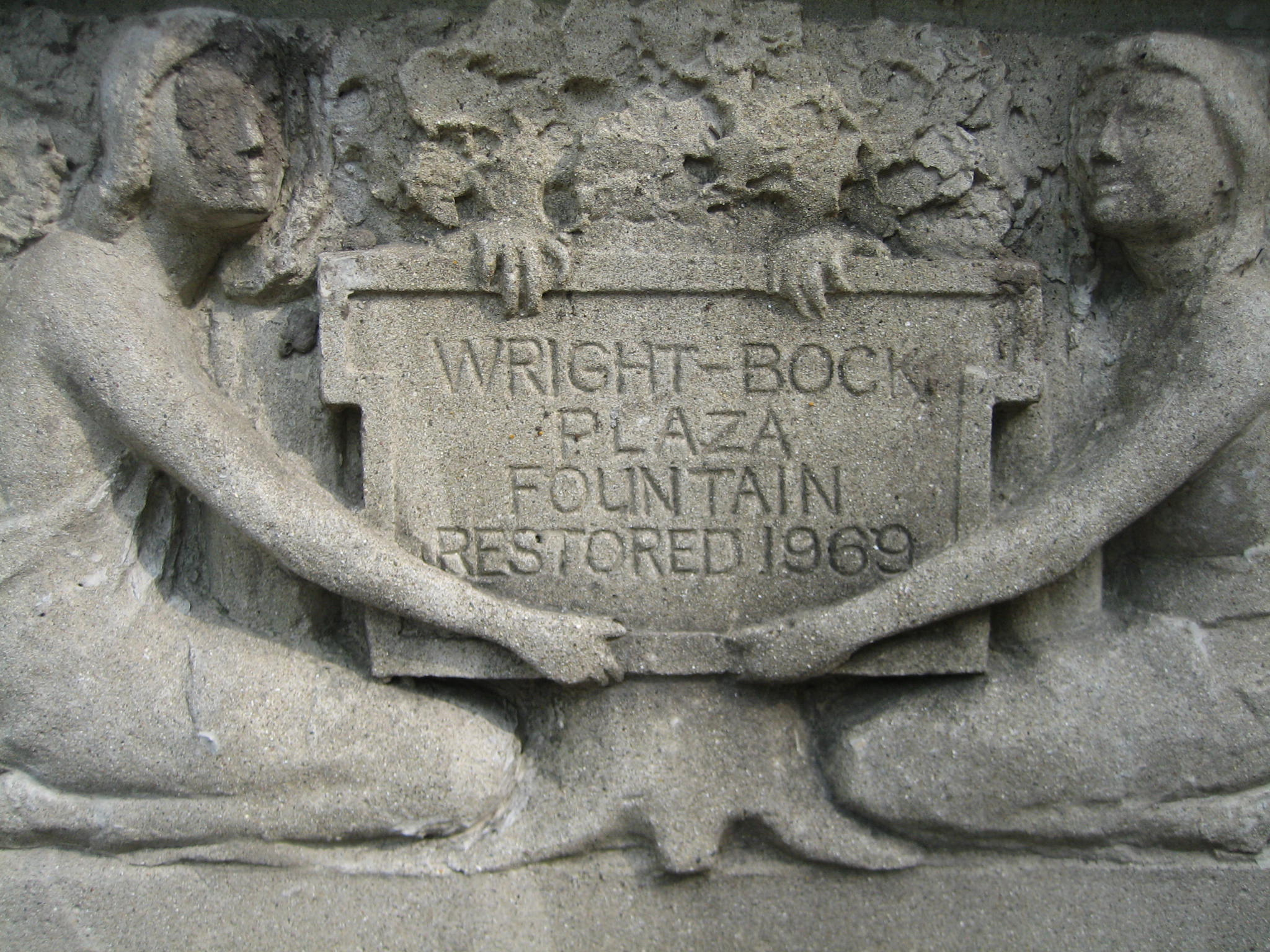
The fountain's replica relief sculpture which echoes original work by Richard Bock, c. 1906

The fountain's rectangular, concrete slab construction has a strong horizontal emphasis. Two vertical slabs act as posts that support a rectangular lintel above, which extends beyond the edges of the posts. The lintel itself acts as a planter. At the base of the fountain a concrete wall extends between the vertical posts. Above the wall is another horizontal slab which acts as the fountain and features the same design as the upper horizontal slab. To either side of the fountain, at its base, are two concrete pools which have since been converted into flower beds.

The center opening, above the fountain, is adorned with cast concrete panels which contain Bock sculpture and dedications. Ornamentation of the concrete slabs is rather limited and exists only in incised triangles and slanted rectangles at the rear and front of the lintel, and incised pyramids at the front and rear of the fountain tray. Above the fountain, are inscriptions and detailed ornamentation. The inscriptions are located on concrete panels above the fountain tray, one reads "Erected in 1909 Oak Park Horse Show Association" and the other reads "Wright-Bock Plaza Fountain restored 1969." The Horse Show Association inscription is on a sculpted plaque held by two kneeling female forms, below the plaque is a tree trunk and above it the tree's leaves. Beneath the dedication panels are recessed lights which illuminate the fountain tray and cast tablets on the inner portion of the vertical posts.

== See also ==
- List of Frank Lloyd Wright works
- Oak Park and River Forest High School
- Oak Park Conservatory
- Scoville Park
