= Frank Lloyd Wright Home and Studio =

House museum in Oak Park, Illinois

- U.S. National Register of Historic Places
- U.S. National Historic Landmark
- U.S. Historic district – Contributing property
- Seen in 2026

- Location within Chicago metropolitan area Location within Illinois Location within the United States
- Interactive map of Frank Lloyd Wright Home and Studio
- Location: 428 Forest Avenue (house) and 951 Chicago Avenue (studio); Oak Park, Illinois, United States
- Coordinates: 41°53′39″N 87°47′59″W
- Area: 0.4 acres (0.16 ha)
- Built: 1889
- Architect: Frank Lloyd Wright
- Architectural style: Shingle Style
- Part of: Frank Lloyd Wright-Prairie School of Architecture Historic District (ID73000699)
- NRHP reference No.: 72000456

Significant dates
- Added to NRHP: September 14, 1972
- Designated NHL: January 7, 1976

The Frank Lloyd Wright Home and Studio is a historic house museum in Oak Park, Illinois, United States. It was built in 1889 by the American architect Frank Lloyd Wright, who lived there with his family for two decades and expanded it multiple times, and consists of two interconnected structures. The house to the south was designed in either the Shingle style or the Queen Anne style, while the studio to the north was designed in the Prairie style. The museum is managed by the Frank Lloyd Wright Preservation Trust, which has restored the building to its appearance in 1909, the year Wright moved out. The building is listed on the National Register of Historic Places as a National Historic Landmark, and it is a contributing property to the Frank Lloyd Wright–Prairie School of Architecture Historic District.

Wright bought the site in 1889, shortly after marrying Catherine "Kitty" Tobin, and developed a cottage there, where they raised six children. Wright added rooms to the house in 1895, and he built the studio annex in 1898, where he and his associates designed dozens of buildings. Wright moved out of the house in 1909, and the home and studio sections were divided into separate residences two years later. Kitty lived in the studio until 1918. After Frank sold the building in 1925, the house and studio became an apartment building and was resold multiple times in the mid-20th century, being split into six residences by the 1940s. The Oak Park Development Corporation bought the building in 1974 and resold it the next year to the National Trust for Historic Preservation. The Frank Lloyd Wright Home and Studio Foundation renovated the building over the next decade. The foundation later became the Frank Lloyd Wright Preservation Trust, which bought the house in 2012 and continues to operate it as a museum.

In designing the building, Wright often experimented with various architectural features, and he generally used details that were functional rather than purely decorative. The facades are made of brick, stone, battens, and shingles. Both sections of the building are wood-frame structures arranged around central fireplaces. The sparsely ornamented rooms contain objects designed by Wright. The house's first floor includes an entry hall, living room, dining room, study, and kitchen, the latter three of which date from 1895. The attached studio has a reception hall, library, office, and double-height drafting room on the same story. The second floor has several bedrooms, a dayroom, and a children's playroom, while the basement was built during the 1980s. The building has received extensive architectural commentary over the years, and it has been the subject of many media works, including books and films.

== Site ==
The Frank Lloyd Wright Home and Studio complex is located in Oak Park, Illinois, United States. The house and studio occupy a plot measuring 88.3 by 165 feet (26.9 by 50.3 m), bounded by Chicago Avenue to the north and Forest Avenue to the west. The house carries the address of 428 Forest Avenue, while the studio is located at 951 Chicago Avenue. Despite the relatively large size of the lot, the house is placed near the southern end, away from Chicago Avenue. A driveway east of the studio leads to a two-car garage, and a driveway south of the house leads to a one-car garage. Both garages were added in 1911. A concrete wall on Forest Avenue, and a taller brick wall on Chicago Avenue, were also built after 1911.

When the American architect Frank Lloyd Wright built the house and studio, there was a ginkgo tree east of the house, as well as a tulip tree and Kentucky coffeetree in its front yard. The original ginkgo tree, planted in the early 19th century, was still there as of 2014. The property also contained a black willow and may have also included butternut, walnut, sugar maple, and honey locust trees, in addition to forsythia bushes. The building is surrounded by a low garden wall, which was designed to blend in with the surrounding trees. There are also various planters, urns, and vegetation.

Just east of the Wright Home and Studio is a house that belonged to Wright's mother Anna, which is located at 931 Chicago Avenue. The house was built c. 1866 in the Gothic Revival style. Also on the same block to the south are the William H. Copeland House and Arthur Heurtley House, along the east side of Forest Avenue. The Walter Gale House, Francis J. Woolley House, and Robert P. Parker House are located on the block to the west, while the Nathan G. Moore House and Edward R. Hills House are on the west side of Forest Avenue, one block to the south.

== Residential and studio use ==
=== Wright use ===
==== Development ====
Frank Lloyd Wright was born in Richland Center, Wisconsin, in 1867 and moved to Illinois in 1887 to pursue an architectural career. Wright first worked for Joseph Lyman Silsbee before joining the Chicago–based architectural firm of Adler & Sullivan in early 1888. Soon after, he moved to Oak Park (then part of the town of Cicero) in Chicago's suburbs. Wright initially lived alone before his mother Anna and two sisters joined him. In June 1889, the 21-year-old Wright married the 18-year-old Catherine Lee "Kitty" Tobin, whom he had met at a local church. With his mother's assistance, Wright obtained a house and barn at the southeast corner of Chicago and Forest avenues in Oak Park. This site was occupied by a gardener named John Blair, who had obtained the site from the developer John Austin. At the time, most of Oak Park's residents lived further south, and the site overlooked a prairie to the north. Wright's mother moved to an adjacent house on Chicago Avenue.

Wright borrowed $5,000 from one of his bosses, Louis Sullivan, (Note: Equivalent to $158,000 in 2024 (Note: Johnston, Louis; Williamson, Samuel H. (2023). "What Was the U.S. GDP Then?". MeasuringWorth. United States Gross Domestic Product deflator figures follow the MeasuringWorth series.)) who took title to the land. In exchange, Wright had to repay the loan within five years. Excluding the land cost, Wright eventually spent $5,300, which included $1,200 from his own savings and $3,500 from Sullivan's loan. (Note: The amount from his savings is equivalent to $38,000, while the amount from the loan is equivalent to $110,000, in 2024) Wright designed the house without regard to what anyone else thought; for example, he carved adages into the walls despite his wife's opposition. Wright was 22 years old when the house was finished in 1889. As built, the house was little more than a cottage, with five rooms on the first floor (including an entry hall) and three rooms on the second floor. The original design included a large gable roof inspired by two of Bruce Price's cottages in Tuxedo Park, New York. Wright also designed clothing for Kitty so it would match the interior color scheme.

==== Initial modifications ====
Wright began modifying the house almost immediately after its completion, when he replaced the windows. Six of his children were born in the Oak Park house: Frank Jr. (better known as Lloyd; 1890), John (1892), Catherine (1894), David (1895), Frances (1898), and Robert (1903). Kitty bemoaned the fact that her husband focused more on the house's design than on his own family, and Wright himself reflected that he did not feel like a father figure to his children. Additionally, the family frequently spent outside their means while living in Oak Park. They hosted extravagant dinner parties and musical performances, and in the meantime Wright fell into debt. To support his family, Wright took on additional jobs, even though his employment contract with Adler & Sullivan forbade it. Wright worked in the second-floor studio–bedroom, creating ten "bootleg houses" without his bosses' authorization from 1891 to 1893. When Sullivan learned of Wright's secondary jobs, Wright was either fired or quit. Sullivan's partner Dankmar Adler transferred ownership of the Oak Park house to Wright, who started his own architectural practice.

The house was first expanded in 1895. On the first floor, the original kitchen was expanded into a dining room, and the original dining room became a study. In addition, a kitchen was added at the rear. On the second floor, Wright's studio–bedroom was split into two rooms (one each for the Wrights' sons and daughters), while the nursery became a dayroom and was expanded. Kitty used the dayroom for reading, sewing, and taking care of the children, A playroom was also built on the second floor, where Kitty hosted a Froebel-game kindergarten class. Though the playroom was ostensibly built for the children, the historian Brendan Gill writes that the space probably would have been constructed in some other fashion even if the Wrights had had no children. After a house was built to the south in 1897, Wright filled in parts of the dining-room windows for privacy.

==== Studio expansion ====
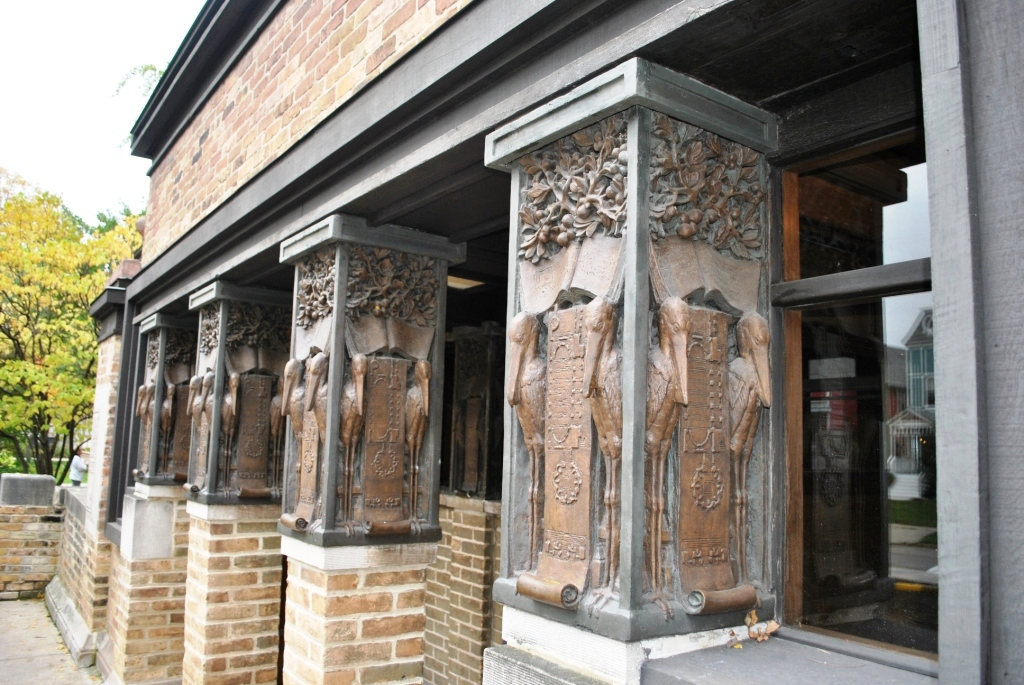
The studio wing's loggia

After Wright moved his firm's Chicago headquarters to the top story of Steinway Hall in 1897, he drew up plans for an architectural studio at his own house. He did not have money to build the studio until the Luxfer Prism Company hired him to design a building. Construction was finished by February 1898, when Wright's official letterhead was changed to mention his Oak Park studio, and Wright and his associates began working out of the studio that year. The building advertised Wright's architectural practice, and he frequently showed the interiors to potential clients.

Wright's firm designed Prairie style buildings en masse after the studio's completion, though sources disagree on how many buildings they designed. (Note: Kalec 1982 gives a figure of 120 residential buildings and 42 other structures, while Weil 2001 gives a figure of over 200 buildings.) Their designs included the Dana-Thomas House, Darwin D. Martin House, Coonley House, Willits House, Laura Gale House, Thomas H. Gale House, Robie House, Unity Temple, and Larkin Building. Typically, Wright had five to seven associates, some of whom worked on designs of their own while working for him. These associates included Richard Bock, Barry Byrne, William Eugene Drummond, Walter Burley Griffin, Marion Mahony Griffin, George Mann Niedecken, Isabel Roberts, John S. Van Bergen, and Charles E. White Jr. Generally, many of Wright's associates stayed only a few years before founding their own firms. Many of the architects were members of arts groups in Chicago, and they frequently traveled to the Art Institute of Chicago or relaxed in the house's playroom. Wright's Oak Park associates formed a close-knit group, in a similar manner to the Taliesin Fellowship decades later.

Even after the studio structure was completed, Wright continued to tinker with his design. He seldom removed things outright, instead adding decorations on top of existing ones. His assistants quipped that he made modifications to the house even when his other projects were behind schedule. In 1905, Wright added a low wall in front of the studio wing's entrance loggia. The rear wall of the studio's reception hall was remodeled, and skylights were added to the studio rooms' ceilings. More clerestory windows were added to the studio's drafting room and library during that time. In addition, Wright added ledges below the drafting room's balcony, and the studio was redecorated with branches and grasses collected by Wright's associates.

=== Subdivision of interiors ===
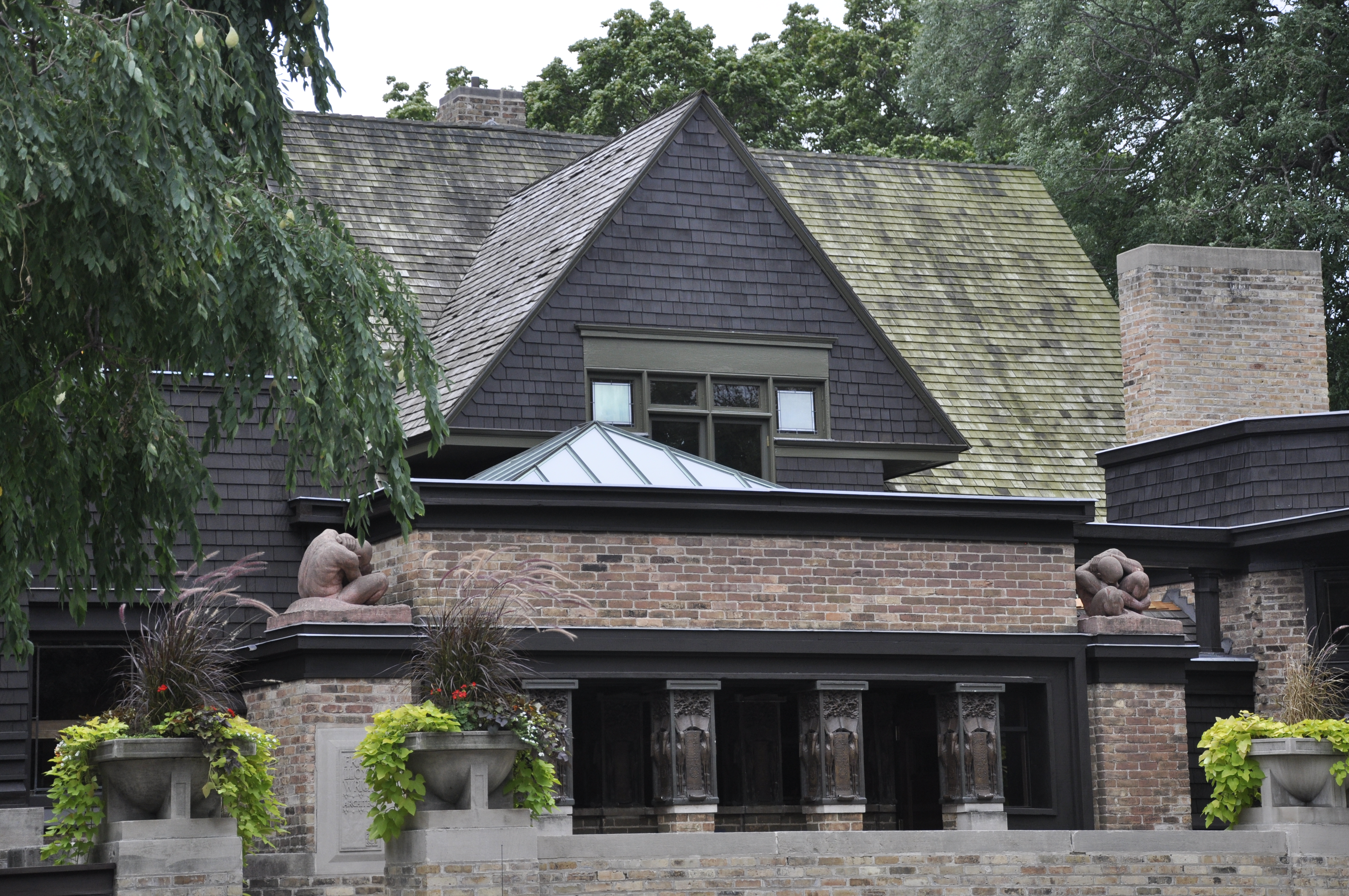
In 1911, Wright erected a high wall in front of the studio entrance to create a private porch.

By 1908, Wright had become disillusioned with the Oak Park studio, and his associates recalled that he was spending less and less time in the studio. Wright traveled to Europe in 1909 to work on his Wasmuth Portfolio, and he ran off with Mamah Borthwick, a client's wife. John Van Bergen and Isabel Roberts finished up his works-in-progress and then closed the Oak Park studio. This marked the end of what was known as his "Oak Park era". Upon his return to the U.S., Wright built his Taliesin studio in 1911 near Spring Green, Wisconsin. Kitty and the children remained in Illinois. A news article that Christmas reported that Wright "did not feel any regret he was not present in the Oak Park house where his lawful wife and their six children were spending their Christmas".

To augment his family's income, in 1911, he created a second residence within the studio, constructing a firewall between the studio and the original home. The house section's main entrance was relocated, and its living room was expanded north. The partition between the children's second-floor bedrooms was removed. In front of the studio's entrance, Wright erected a high wall, creating a private porch. The studio's drafting room, its office, and the passageway to the main house were respectively repurposed into a living room, a dining room, and a kitchen. The studio's Chicago Avenue entrance was remodeled, and bedrooms were constructed on the second floor, replacing the drafting room's balcony. Wright built a walled garden west of the studio, creating a private space for that residence. To the south and east of the building, he added two driveways, a two-car garage, and a one-car garage. Another rental apartment was then built above the garages. With the growing popularity of automobiles, Wright installed gasoline pumps in the garages.

After the modifications were completed, Kitty and her children moved into the studio. Wright borrowed $20,000 from the businessman Darwin D. Martin, (Note: Equivalent to $488,000 in 2024) for whom he had designed a house in Buffalo, New York. Though Wright's name remained on the property deed, Martin was his main creditor. Alfred MacArthur, one of Wright's tenants agreed in 1915 to pay $15,000 for the structure on Forest Avenue. (Note: Equivalent to $336,000 in 2024) However, Martin would allow the sale only if Wright agreed to several restrictive conditions, so Wright ultimately reneged on his sale agreement. Kitty, their son John, their youngest children, and multiple employees continued to live in the studio. The employees who lived there included Alfonso Iannelli, who lived there in 1914 while designing sculptures for the Midway Gardens, and Rudolph Schindler, who lived there in 1919 while designing Los Angeles's Hollyhock House and other buildings. Schindler recalled that the old studio was very leaky and unsuccessfully tried to upgrade the heating.

=== Relocation of the Wright family ===
Kitty and her youngest son moved out of the studio in 1918, after the remaining Wright children had already moved away. MacArthur moved out in 1920 because Wright had raised the monthly rent to $170, (Note: Equivalent to $2,732 in 2025 (Note: 1634–1699: McCusker, J. J. (1997). How Much Is That in Real Money? A Historical Price Index for Use as a Deflator of Money Values in the Economy of the United States: Addenda et Corrigenda (PDF). American Antiquarian Society. 1700–1799: McCusker, J. J. (1992). How Much Is That in Real Money? A Historical Price Index for Use as a Deflator of Money Values in the Economy of the United States (PDF). American Antiquarian Society. 1800–present: Federal Reserve Bank of Minneapolis. "Consumer Price Index (estimate) 1800–".)) far above the market rate for the area. Schindler convinced Wright to lower the rent, and he was able to re-rent the house to a factory manager and the studio to a United States Shipping Board manager. The servants' residence was split into additional apartments, and Schindler moved out in April 1920. At some point between 1918 and 1925, the four bedrooms above the studio were converted into a living room.

Wright's brother-in-law Andrew Porter, who lived in Anna Wright's house next door, drew plans for an expansion of the Wright house at the request of his wife, Frank's sister Jane. This expansion, which would have connected with Frank's studio, was never built because the Porters instead decided to buy the Arthur Heurtley House. Instead, Wright designed an overpass between the drafting room and the apartment above the two-car garage, so these rooms could be combined as needed. Wright still had not paid off his debt to Martin, who nonetheless allowed Wright to place the building for sale. By 1922, local artists had rented space in two of the complex's apartments, while Wright's family lived in the third apartment; an article from the next year cites five artists as living there. The Austin–Oak Park–River Forest Art League moved into the studio section of the complex in 1924.

=== Later ownership ===
==== Mid-1920s to mid-1940s ====
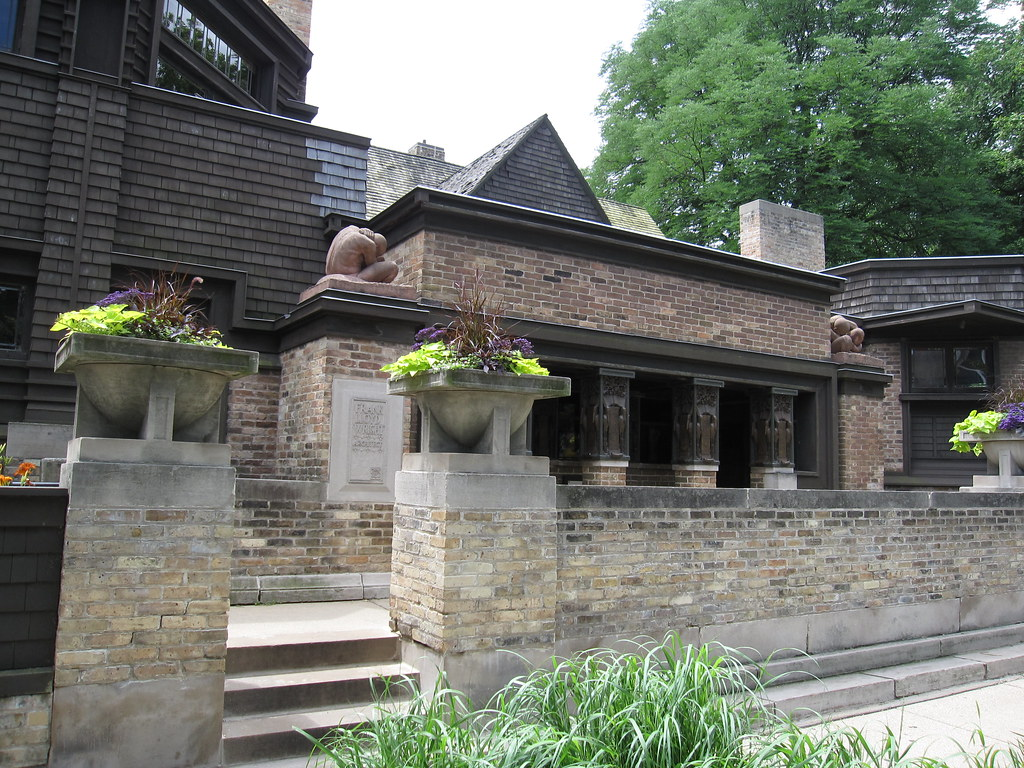
Exterior of Wright's studio as seen from Chicago Avenue

The studio and house were sold in 1925 to John O. Bastear and Alva Thomas. Bastear and Thomas are recorded as having paid $28,250 for the building, with a loan from Martin, (Note: Equivalent to $401,000 in 2024) while the Chicago Tribune reported the sale price as $33,250. (Note: Equivalent to $473,000 in 2024) The new owners were to pay Martin $250 a month through 1930, collecting rent revenue from the building. (Note: Equivalent to $4,018 in 2025) The Austin–Oak Park–River Forest Art League then expanded its space there. Oak Park's village government rejected the art organization's proposal to turn the studio into a teahouse, instead permitting the league to host art exhibitions there. The building housed the Art League until 1928 or 1929.

After Bastear and Thomas failed to repay their loan from Martin, the latter sued 20 defendants in 1930 to collect nearly $33,000 in debt. (Note: Equivalent to $492,000 in 2024) Martin won his lawsuit in 1933, initiating a foreclosure proceeding. His wife Isabelle acquired the house for $33,000. The next year, she transferred ownership to her husband's firm, Buffalo Phoenix Company, which continued to rent the house out. The Martin family also had difficulties renting out the Wright Home and Studio, so it again went into foreclosure in 1943. That year, Norman and Elizabeth Beggs paid $18,000 for the complex. (Note: Equivalent to $260,000 in 2024)

==== Nooker ownership ====
Clyde and Charlotte Nooker bought the building in 1946. During the mid-20th century, the building was divided into six apartments: (Note: Some sources claim that there may have been up to seven apartments.) three on the first floor, two on the second floor, and one above the two-car garage. The Nookers lived in the former studio. In 1956, Wright designed a bathroom, dressing room, and kitchen for the Nookers, and he restored the studio's library and office.

The Nooker family opened the house to the public for occasional tours in either 1965 or 1966. To allow visitors to see the drafting room and the original house, the Nookers relocated to the apartment at the rear of the first floor. The tours included the second dining room from 1895 and the second-floor bedrooms. Because of the various modifications over the years, the tours were conducted in two parts, and relatively few of the original decorations remained. The Chicago Tribune wrote that Charlotte Nooker often gave tours while wearing a replica of one of Wright's capes. The St. Louis Post-Dispatch described the building as "a run-down rooming house where worshipful architects would appear at the doorstep, on pilgrimage".

By the early 1970s, fourteen of the house's 25 rooms were open to the public five days a week between April and December. The two second-floor apartments were occupied by multiple women who shared a bathroom, a kitchen (within the master bedroom), and a dining room (within the playroom). Charlotte placed the house for sale in 1972 when her husband died. The director of Oak Park's Landmarks Commission said the Nooker family had declined an offer from local residents to purchase the house. Local residents formed the Committee for the Purchase of the Frank Lloyd Wright House and Studio in late 1973. Dawn Goshorn, who later became president of the Wright Home and Studio Foundation, led efforts to acquire the building. Goshorn asked several local banks for loans; they agreed to provide up to $150,000 to buy the building, although Charlotte wanted $400,000. Charlotte eventually reduced her asking price to $168,000.

== Museum use ==
=== 1970s sales ===
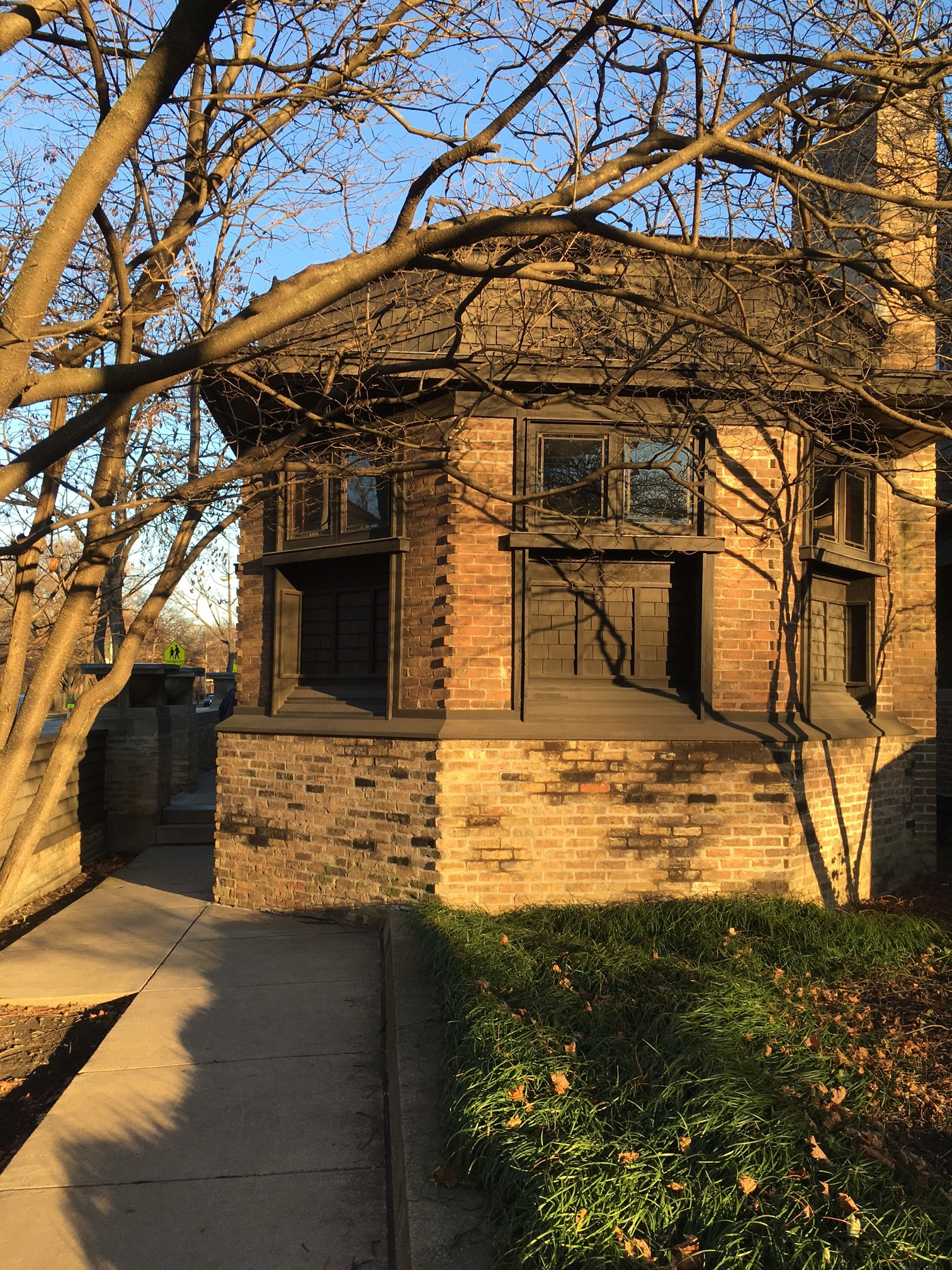
Exterior of the studio's library as seen from Forest Avenue

The Oak Park Development Corporation bought the house and studio in July 1974; it was the first project the corporation had ever undertaken. The purchase price was financed by a loan from Avenue State Bank, which provided $168,000. (Note: A 1986 Chicago Tribune article gives a conflicting figure of $165,000.) The corporation handed over operations to the Frank Lloyd Wright Home and Studio Foundation, which had been organized that June to care for the building. The home and studio opened as a museum on July 17, 1974, charging an admission fee to raise funds for preservation. Shortly afterward, Frank's eldest son Lloyd revisited the building, saying that "it's a miracle" that the house section's decorations remained largely intact. Lloyd regarded the building's sale as part of a "stupid" trend of selling off land for profit, though he expressed optimism about the complex's preservation. The trust hired dozens of "interpreters" or tour guides; within seven weeks, they had given tours to 1,600 visitors.

The Home and Studio Foundation requested a special permit from the village to host events, though local residents worried that this would increase noise pollution and congestion. The village's planning commission recommended that December that the special permit be granted. The foundation also asked the National Trust for Historic Preservation to buy the building and lease it back for a nominal fee. By early 1975, the National Trust had agreed to buy the building and provide a $106,500 matching grant if the foundation raised an equivalent amount before June 30. Although the trust usually distributed small grants, it made an exemption for the museum because of the urgency involved. The village approved a special permit that February, under the condition that the foundation buy the house back if the trust were to dissolve. The Home and Studio Foundation also requested $15,000 in federal community development funds for the building's purchase, The United States Department of Housing and Urban Development provided $22,500 in community development funds, including money diverted from other projects. With this money, the foundation was able to hire an executive director.

The Home and Studio Foundation raised funds from a variety of sources, from formal fundraising benefits to small-dollar donations. Funds came from individual donations, organizations, and various governments; the vast majority of the funds came from local residents. The donors included the actress Anne Baxter, one of Wright's grandchildren. To raise additional money, the foundation opened the Ginkgo Tree Shop in December 1974 or 1975. After sufficient funding had been raised, the National Trust finalized its acquisition in mid-1975. The price was variously cited as $168,000 or $190,000. The Home and Studio Foundation leased the building for 40 years at $10 annually, and a local teacher was hired as a live-in caretaker. By then, there were plans to raise $500,000 for renovation.

=== Renovation ===
==== Initial work and house renovation ====
The building had deteriorated extensively over the years, both because of a lack of maintenance and because it had been completed hastily; for instance, the library was tilting to one side. As such, the National Trust began emergency repairs, including fixes to the windows, walls, chimneys, and roof. Work began on February 28, 1976, when the wall in front of the studio's main entrance was demolished. By then, there were plans to have the National Park Service take over the building, and the renovation cost had increased to $1 million. The federal government had provided a $10,000 grant, and the Oak Park village government provided another $20,000. To raise further money, the foundation hosted tours of several Wright–designed houses in Oak Park. Ultimately, the foundation raised $250,000 between 1974 and 1980, all of which was spent on urgent repairs.

Ten to fifteen volunteers formed the building's primary restoration team, out of more than 300 people who volunteered for the Home and Studio Foundation annually. The restoration team was variously nicknamed the "Hole in the Wall Gang", because they had destroyed the wall between the home and studio, and the "Saturday Morning Strippers", because they removed old paint from the walls. The restorers sought to replicate the original design precisely. This was complicated by the fact that no blueprints of the entire complex existed. There had been many unrecorded alterations over the years, and certain aspects of the original design, such as the paint colors, had to be analyzed several times. The Home and Studio Foundation conducted archeological studies of the original architectural details, and it also commissioned studies of the building's history. The foundation obtained documents about the building and interviewed several of the Wrights' surviving children, who often disagreed over the historical details. Wright's descendants also helped with fundraising efforts. The museum remained open during the restoration, accommodating 7,500 annual visitors by the late 1970s.

In late 1977, the foundation presented four options for the building's restoration, which ranged from retaining the existing appearance to restoring a design from a certain year. Ultimately, the foundation decided to restore the house to its 1909 appearance. Lloyd coordinated with the Home and Studio Foundation until his death in 1978, and Lloyd's brother David was also active in the restoration process. The first phase of renovations cost $38,000 and included repairs to the roof, windows, walls, and decorative trim. The first room to be completed was the dining room, which was finished in 1977 with a budget of $30,000. During the late 1970s and early 1980s, the Home and Studio Foundation also made changes to the windows, woodwork, veranda walls, and lighting, and it updated the playroom, the dayroom, and the living room's inglenook. It also obtained some of the original furniture. A local bank donated funds to refurbish a mural in the house in 1979, and the Ginkgo Tree Shop relocated to one of the garages that year.

==== Studio renovation ====
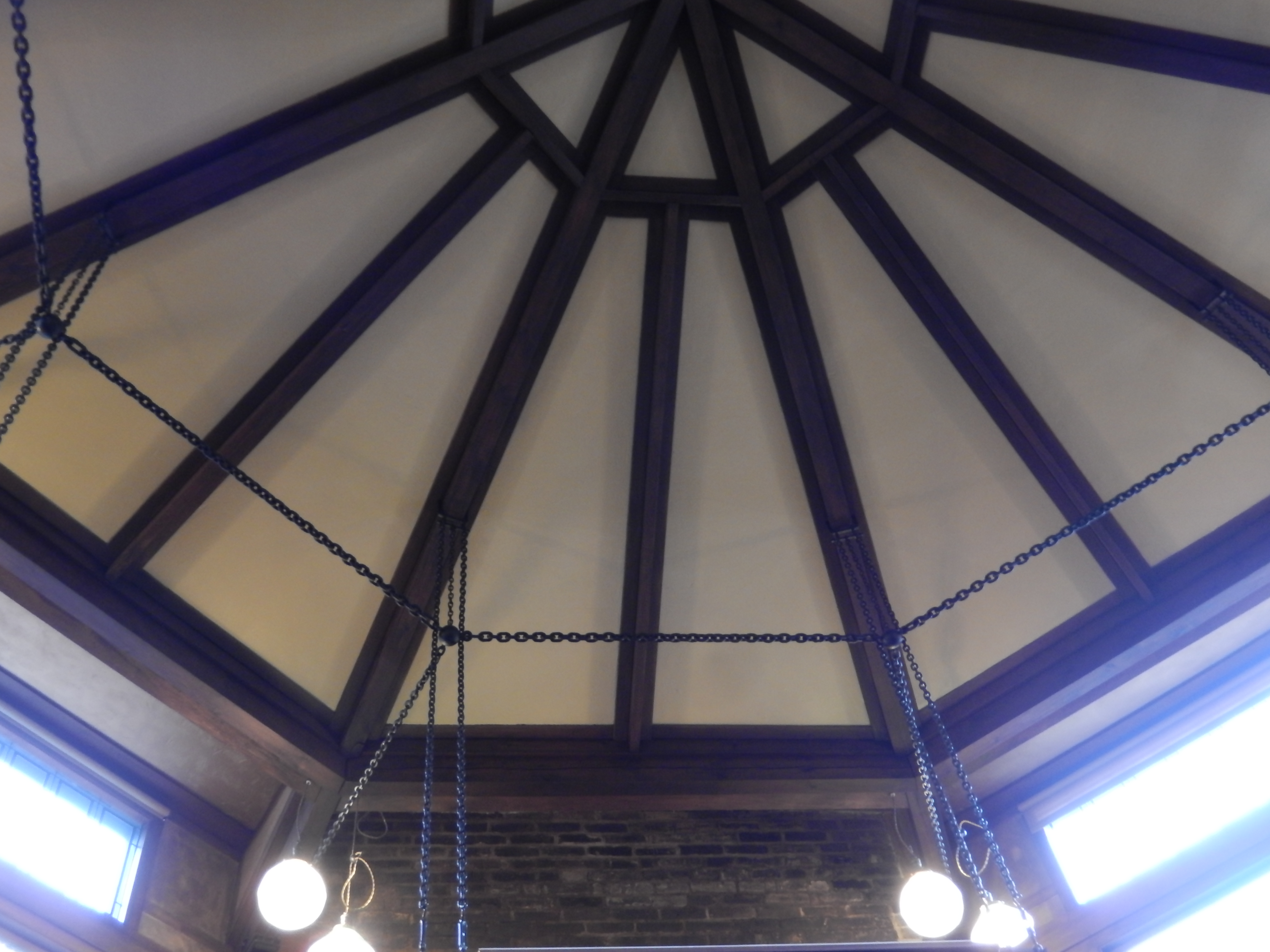
The drafting room ceiling, which was restored in the 1980s

From 1980 to 1981, another $180,000 was raised for the building's renovation, including some funds from auctions. The Home and Studio Foundation announced in October 1981 that it would raise $1 million for further renovations; at the time, the foundation had already raised more than $300,000. The studio's renovation began in September 1982, at which point that work was budgeted at $650,000. Unlike the home, the studio had to be fully reconstructed. Initial work on the studio included repairs to the structural foundation, floors, and walls. The Home and Studio Foundation received a $100,000 challenge grant from the National Endowment for the Arts the next month, which required the foundation to raise another $400,000 by January 1985.

The village of Oak Park bought the adjacent residence of Wright's mother in 1983 and agreed to renovate it. At that point, the Home and Studio Foundation had raised about $1.1 million. The foundation relocated to Wright's mother's house in 1985. As part of the studio's restoration, workers built a full basement, hiring an outside firm to shore up the building. The facade was restored to its 1911 appearance. The rooms above the office and drafting room were removed, and the office and the drafting room's balcony and storage areas were rebuilt. In addition, workers restored the library. Workers discovered pieces of the original design and furnishings that had remained in the house over the years. The foundation received a grant from Steelcase in early 1984, which covered much of the remaining restoration cost.

The building recorded 35,000 to 40,000 annual visitors by the mid-1980s. The Globe and Mail wrote that the increasing visitation "is another example of a steadily growing interest" in Wright's work. Workers restored the house's murals in 1986, and American Express financed the restoration of two sculptures above the studio's entrance. By the middle of that year, the project was finished except for furnishings. The Home and Studio Foundation borrowed Wright–designed objects from other buildings due to the high cost of these objects.

=== Late 1980s to 2000s ===
The museum was officially rededicated in May 1987 after all remaining work was finished. The studio's renovation alone had cost $1.25 million, and the overall project had cost about $2 million. (Note: Forest Leaves and the Associated Press give a figure of precisely $2 million. Several other sources give varying estimates of $1.8 million, $2.1 million, or $2.2 million.) The museum had 67,000 annual visitors by the 1980s, and gift-shop revenue increased as well. The increased visitation caused its own problems: Two faucets and a brick were stolen soon after the renovation was finished. Additionally, David Wright had insisted that the house's original staircase had been much narrower than what had been built during the renovation. As such, workers rebuilt the staircase again in 1991 with funds from David and his wife Gladys. The same year, the Home and Studio Foundation landscaped the garden for $5,000, adding plants that had existed when Wright lived there. To pay for maintenance and promotion, the Home and Studio Foundation continued to host tours and sell merchandise.

The museum accommodated at least 74,000 annual visitors by the 1990s. (Note: Sources from 1996 give differing figures of 74, 75, or 77 thousand visitors.) Local residents were increasingly frustrated with the popularity of the museum and its walking tours, claiming that tourists invaded their privacy, though museum officials tried to limit the sizes of their tours. In addition, residents of Forest Avenue claimed that the increase in tourism was making it harder for them to sell their houses. By 2000, the museum's annual visitation had increased to 115,000. The Home and Studio Foundation, which became the Frank Lloyd Wright Preservation Trust that year, sold engraved bricks to finance the renovations of the Robie House and Wright's Oak Park compound. In 2007, the museum's Ginkgo Tree Bookshop became the Home and Studio Museum Shop.

=== 2010s to present ===
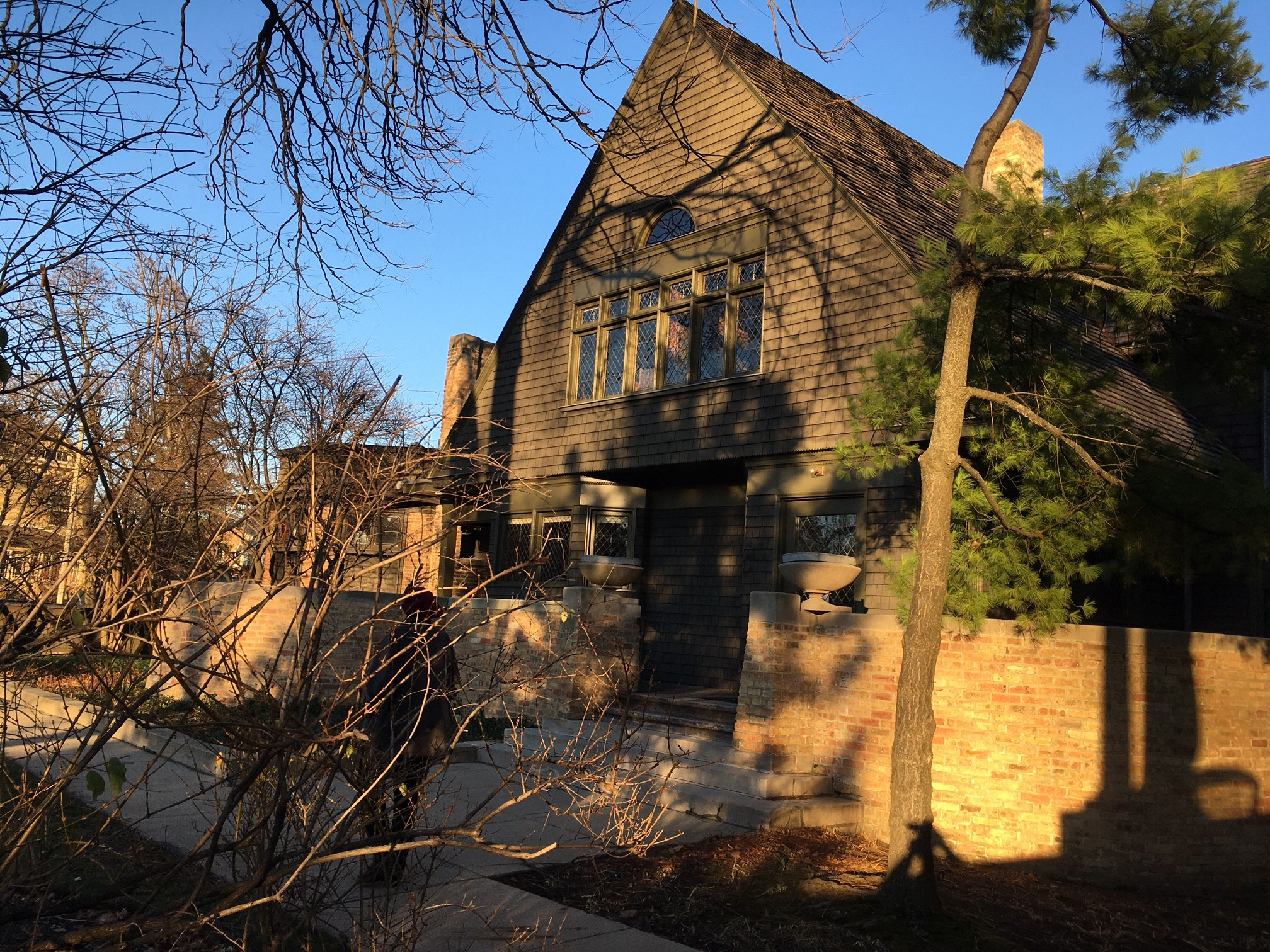
Exterior of the house as seen from Forest Avenue

After Celeste Adams became the Wright Trust's president in 2010, she began making plans to repaint the home and studio, and the trust also devised plans for the building's maintenance. The trust began raising funds to buy the home and studio the following July, and it obtained the building in May 2012 after paying off its lease. Afterward, it continued to raise funds for the building's maintenance. After one of the windows was damaged in a storm in 2013, the trust repaired that window. Additionally, due to narrow stairs, the restored balcony in the studio's drafting room was originally closed to the public. The Wright Trust opened the balcony in 2014, although only the first and last tour groups of the day were allowed onto the balcony. The museum had 92,000 annual visitors by the mid-2010s.

The Wright Trust purchased a neighboring house at 925 Chicago Avenue in December 2017 for $340,000. Although Wright had not had any connection to the house, the trust wished to use it for future investment. In June 2019, the trust proposed demolishing 925 Chicago Avenue and modifying 931 Chicago Avenue to accommodate a visitor center. John Ronan was hired to design the one-story visitor center, which would have included a store, an information center, a reception hall, and a plaza connecting it to the main home. The visitor center would have covered 8,000 to 9,000 square feet (740 to 840 m^{2}) and accommodated 90,000 annual visitors. Ronan's proposal had beaten out designs from four other firms. The Historic Preservation Commission of Oak Park rejected Ronan's plans in August 2019 after several commissioners opposed the plans. The Wright Trust then announced that it would not proceed with Ronan's design.

Tours of the home and studio were suspended in March 2020 due to the COVID-19 pandemic in Illinois. The building reopened that June. Next door, 925 Chicago Avenue remained vacant for two years, and its exterior became rundown. The trust announced in 2022 that it would renovate that building. The trust devised an alternate plan to convert 925 Chicago Avenue into an art resource center and a library for Wright's archives. Ronan designed plans for a new building that would house a visitor center. During late 2023, the trust replaced the building's roof, installed replacement shingles, and restored the two chimneys. The next year, the village of Oak Park approved the revised visitor-center plans.

== Architecture ==
Wright's Oak Park home and studio was the first house that he designed without a partner. The house is variously cited as having been designed in the Shingle style or the Queen Anne style, and the studio is cited as being in the Prairie style. At the time of the building's construction, architects did not frequently have combined house–studios, though artists did. Wright used the building as a testing ground, frequently adding features only to remove them later. He used geometric shapes throughout the building, as well as details such as art glass and organic motifs. Wright generally used architectural features that were functional (such as built-in furniture and seating niches), rather than purely decorative.

=== Exterior ===
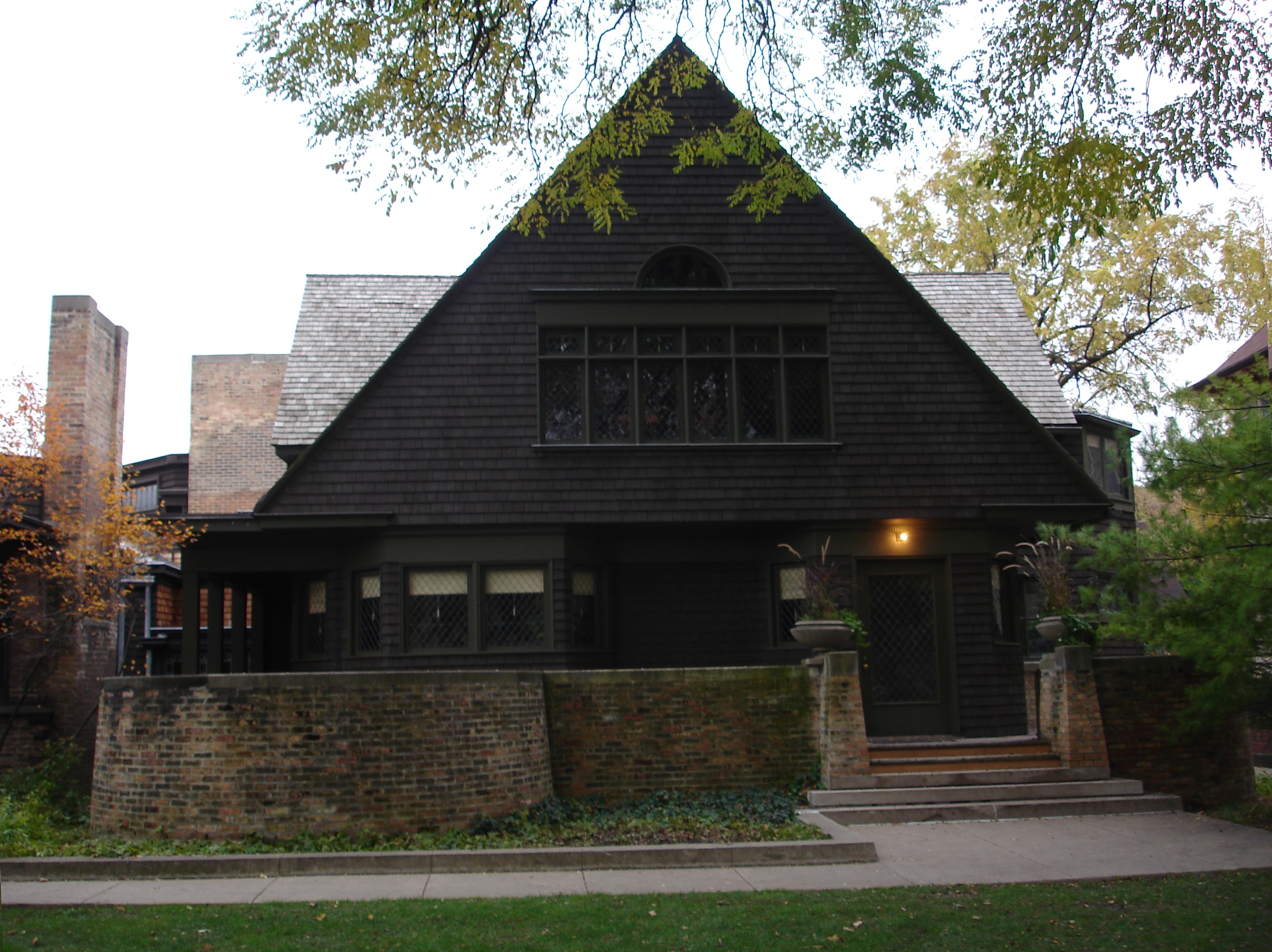
The house's western facade

The facades of both the house and studio are made of brick, stone, battens, and shingles, all of which were used to blend in with the forested areas nearby. The foundation walls are made of rubblestone, atop which the base of the facade is clad in a brick veneer. The rest of the facade is made of green wood shingles (later repainted olive) and thin sheathing boards, while the roof is made of cedar shingles. The exterior includes geometric design features such as rectangular windows, semicircular lunettes, rhombus-shaped glass panes, and sawtooth-shaped shingles. Both sections also have veranda walls made of brick and topped by a limestone coping. Wright, who did not like curtains, instead used art glass and clerestory windows to illuminate the complex and give its occupants privacy. The high roofs of the exterior contrasted with those of Wright's later buildings, which were generally lower to the ground, with protruding eaves.

==== House ====
The house consists of a stone base and a gable roof that slopes down to just above the doors and windows. The National Park Service cites the roof's shape as an allusion to Wright's predilection for "picturesque" architectural details. He also included design details like inglenooks and protruding polygonal bays, in addition to Shingle-style elements like rectangular windows and circular verandas.

In contrast to Wright's later buildings, which often had circuitous entrances, the house's entrance is visible right from the street. The main entrance faces Forest Avenue to the west. The entrance was originally from a Dutch door, which opened onto a veranda to the west. This door, which was restored in the 1970s, is asymmetrically placed on the south or right side of the facade. Two polygonal bays protrude from the living room onto the veranda, and another polygonal bay on the living room's north wall was added in 1895. The polygonal bays are interspersed with large windows to create curtain walls; Wright described the exterior walls as "light screens" because they did not "box in" the interior spaces. The second-story windows are recessed from the triangular gables in the roof.

==== Studio ====
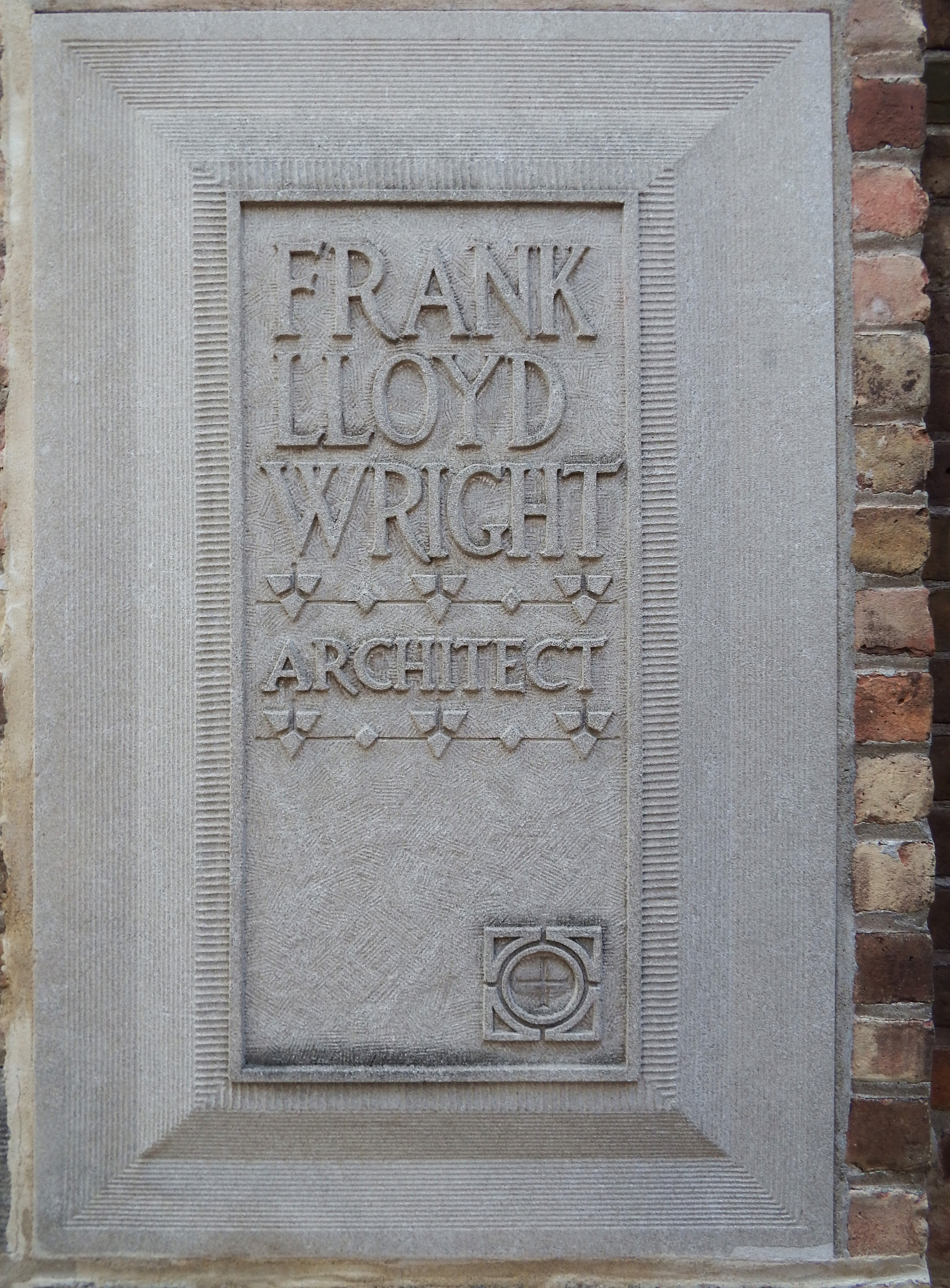
Limestone plaque on the studio's facade, proclaiming Wright's name and occupation. This is a replica of the original plaque, which was moved in 1911 to Taliesin.

The studio occupies the house's former northern yard, along Chicago Avenue. The northern elevation of the studio's facade is asymmetrical and measures 75 feet (23 m) wide. As seen from the north, the studio consists of a rectangular hall with a two-story octagonal drafting room to the east and a one-and-a-half-story octagonal library to the west. The massing of the studio reflected the interior layout, an example of the "form follows function" principle. The studio was built very cheaply; it rested on brick piers, which were connected to each other by wooden joists and girders. When the studio's basement level was constructed in the 1980s the piers were replaced with caissons. The base of the studio's facade is wainscoted, visually linking it with the house.

At the center of the studio's northern facade is an entrance loggia. It was accessed by a wide stoop until 1905, when a low partition wall flanked by stairs was installed in front of it. Next to the entrance is a limestone plaque proclaiming Wright's name and occupation, in addition to a pair of limestone urns. The current plaque is a replica of the original, which was moved in 1911 to Taliesin. The columns in the loggia have bronze-colored plaster casts designed by Richard Bock. The loggia's columns depict the tree of life, a book of knowledge, an architectural scroll, and two storks. A cantilevered canopy was installed above the loggia in 1911 and was removed in the 1970s. Between the drafting room's clerestory windows were figures designed by Bock, which were replaced in the 1970s with replicas of sculptures that Wright himself designed.

=== Interior ===
Both sections of the building are wood-frame structures. Wright did not adhere to a Victorian–style floor plan, in which the interior is divided into clearly defined rooms. Instead, the building's layout partly resembles an open plan, and many spaces lack doors, a feature shared with Wright's later commissions, Though the home and the studio are internally connected, both sections of the building have distinct designs. Both the house and the studio are arranged around central fireplaces. Instead of an attic, the house's second floor has high ceilings. Wright used a gold and green color scheme throughout the building, and he also selected all the materials used inside. Some of the house's other features, such as running tap water, flush toilets, and central heating, were not common at the time of its construction.

The rooms had sparse ornamentation, being furnished with objects that Wright had obtained at auction. These included Japanese silk prints, Oriental rugs, Ancient Greek sculpture, Victorian lamps, and Chinese and Jacobean furniture. Wright also designed some of his own furniture for the house. By 1905, the original classical artwork had been removed, and Wright had added art by painters from the Midwestern United States. There are also three murals designed by Orlando Giannini, one of Wright's associates. Some decorative details, like ceiling panels and the original floor plan, were inspired by Japanese architecture. Wright also designed other objects for the building, such as lights, toys, and kitchenware. The modern-day museum includes objects similar to those belonging to the Wrights. These include furniture and Froebel gifts, as well as a display of Lincoln Logs, a toy invented by Wright's son John.

==== House first floor ====
The original first floor consisted of five rooms arranged around a chimney, in a variation of the then-popular "four square" floor plan. These rooms included an entry hall to the southwest, a living room to the northwest, a dining room to the northeast, a pantry to the east, and a kitchen to the southeast. The rooms to the east originally overlooked a rear porch, and the original kitchen and pantry were the only first-floor rooms with doors. With the 1895 modifications, the overall floor plan was changed to a cross-axial plan, which was also adopted in many of Wright's later designs. A horizontal wooden band runs just above each room's doorways or archways. Wright tested out various decorations, including Oriental runners that visually separated the rooms. The entry hall has a plaster frieze, whose design was copied from the ancient Greek Pergamon Altar. A stair, with a wide landing protruding into the entry hall, ascends to the second floor. Wright narrowed the stairs between 1905 and 1907, a subsequent restoration maintained the narrowed width.

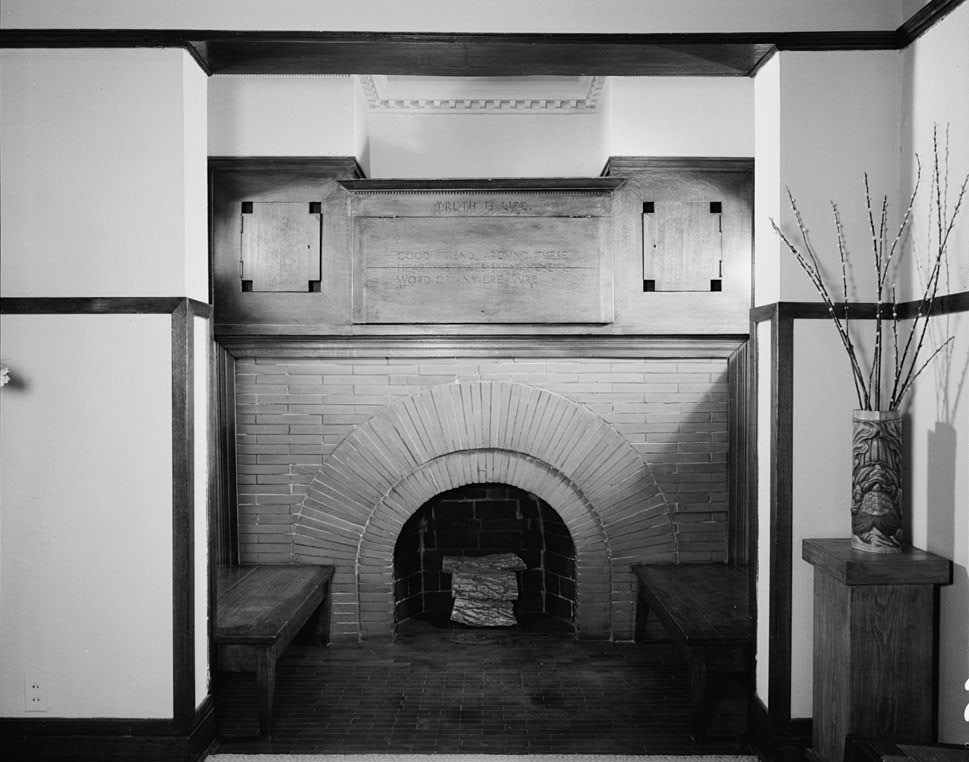
Fireplace in the living room. There is a mirror above the mantel.

The living room, an early example of Wright's organic architecture, contrasted with the Victorian–style living rooms that predominated in contemporary homes. The living room had wide openings without doors, allowing people to see diagonally across to the study. At the center is an inglenook with a round-arched brick fireplace and built-in seating. The fireplace's mantelpiece contains an inscription that begins with the adage "Truth Is Life", which was installed despite Kitty Wright's objections. A mirror is installed above the fireplace, and openings on either side overlook the dining room and study. The octagonal bays to the north and west had further seating and form a continuous window around the northwest corner. The living room's ceiling has plaster beams and a cornice patterned after those of the Auditorium Theatre's second-story lobby. The modern-day living room has armchairs, East Asian furniture, and artwork by Wright's friends William Wendt and Charles Abel Corwin.

The 1895 dining room replaced the original kitchen. It has a red-tile floor, golden walls, and oak trim, which were intended to emphasize the house's earth-toned color palette. In contrast to Wright's earlier rooms, which had wallpaper, the walls are covered with burlap. A partially-octagonal, five-sided bay with art-glass windows extends to the south; it contains built-in cabinets with radiators inside. The dining room has a table and high-backed chairs; Wright intended these to give the dining room an intimate feel, creating a "room within a room". The furniture, which included a custom-made high chair, was among the first Wright ever designed. The dining room has indirect-lighting fixtures covered by wooden grilles. Additionally, there is a fireplace at the northern wall, with a high mantelpiece made of red tile.

The study replaced the original dining room. After its 1895 renovation, the study had tall cabinets and a sculpture by Hermon Atkins MacNeil. The study contains a table and chairs salvaged from Wright's other buildings, as well as a replica of a cabinet. The adjacent pantry was also expanded during the 1895 renovation and has a sink, maple floors, and cabinets. A secondary stair to the second floor, extending off the pantry, dates from that renovation. To the east is a maid's room and kitchen, both added in 1895. The kitchen has a cast-iron stove, casement windows, and a rear door for ice and coal deliveries.

==== Studio first floor ====
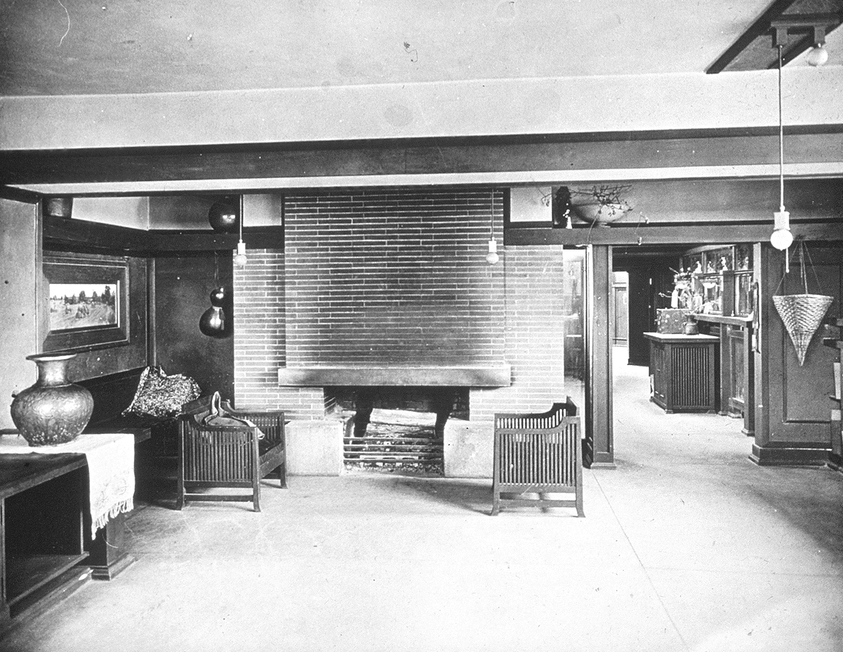
Drafting room

The studio's Chicago Avenue loggia leads to a reception hall with three gold-and-green art glass skylights, separated by deep wooden beams. The south wall of that room was originally angled but was remodeled in the mid-1900s, creating a rectangular reception hall. The modern-day reception hall has a magnesite floor and replicas of a desk and chairs. Doorways lead south from the reception hall to the office, west to the library, and east to the drafting room. Like the original house, the studio's rooms are arranged around a central fireplace. Underneath these rooms is a full basement, which was built in the 1980s for the Frank Lloyd Wright Preservation Trust's research center.

The double-height drafting room was originally 22 feet (6.7 m) or 23 feet (7.0 m) high. The drafting room's first floor is a square with 27-or-28-foot (8.2 or 8.5 m) sides, as well as plaster moldings and wood carvings. The drafting room floor is made of magnesite, and the first floor has small windows on two sides. Wright designed the original furniture, including backless wooden stools, tables, and cabinets. Lamps were suspended from the balcony and above desks. The west wall has an arched fireplace mantel, with plaster decorations adapted from the Heller House. The corners of the drafting room originally had closets, since the octagonal balcony above it was smaller than the main drafting-room floor. Architectural drawings were stored in a vault to the south, and there were heating and wooden cabinets as well. Ledges were suspended from the balcony in 1905, and brick piers and a rectangular fireplace mantel were added in 1911. When the house was restored in the 1970s, the original mantel was restored, and replicas of the original furniture were added.

Leading off the drafting room is a corridor with a pitched wooden ceiling and a short flight of stairs ascending to the house. The corridor was positioned to avoid a willow tree that predated the house's construction; the original tree has since been replaced. The office, which connects directly to the drafting room, was shared by Wright's staff. It had poplar and basswood furniture, which he designed himself, in addition to a round-arched brick fireplace. The office originally had an art-glass ceiling, which was removed in 1911. An art glass door on the west wall, dating from the same era, replaced a set of windows on that wall. Following the 1970s renovation, the original ceiling and windows were restored. The modern office includes replica furniture and a plaster cast of a sculpture by Luca della Robbia. A staircase descends from the office to a bathroom and storerooms in the basement.

The connection to the library is via a short, low corridor lined with cabinets. A bathroom was added next to the library corridor in 1911. The library itself is an octagonal room with bookshelves and cabinets on its walls. There are no windows at ground level, as Wright did not want visitors to be distracted. Instead, the room is illuminated by globes, and the tops of the walls have clerestory windows with wooden grilles. The plaster ceiling is pitched upward, matching the slope of the roof; it is concealed above a skylight with frosted glass. In addition to replicas of the original cabinets, the library is furnished with a table and chairs.

==== Second floor ====
The second floor originally included a studio–bedroom to the west, a master bedroom to the northeast, and a nursery (later dayroom) to the southeast. The studio–bedroom has a high ceiling and built-in cabinets. The studio–bedroom is bisected by a partition, which separated the Wrights' sons' and daughters' bedrooms; it displays a table and a bed salvaged from Wright's other buildings. (Note: Though some sources give the partition's height as 6 feet (1.8 m), David Wright recalled that the partition was 7 feet (2.1 m) high.) The master bedroom has two Giannini murals of Native Americans, in addition to a frieze, inspired by another in the Auditorium Theatre. There are amphora-shaped chandeliers on the ceiling and a replica of the original birchwood bed. The dayroom has built-in closets and a polygonal bay at its southern end, which has a lower ceiling than the rest of the room. The rooms were separated from each other by a bathroom to the east, a closet to the north, and a stair to the south. The bathroom and two additional closets to the east were cantilevered off the facade. Unusually for bathrooms of the 1890s, the second-floor bathroom has board-and-batten walls.

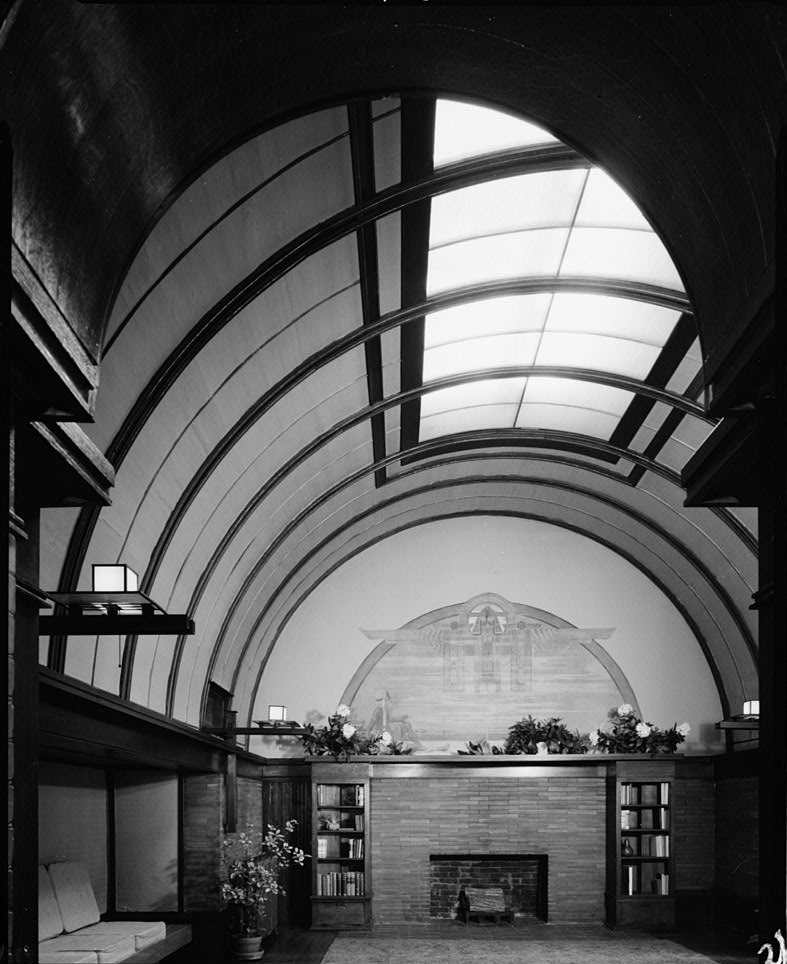
Playroom

A low passageway north of the dayroom extends east to the playroom, built in 1895. The playroom has a high barrel-vaulted ceiling, a feature that Wright never used in any other building. The ceiling's skylight had four ornate oak grilles, which were reproduced in the 1980s. The lowest portions of the playroom's walls are made of brick. Within the dayroom's attic, a gallery overlooks the playroom. The north and south walls have bay windows with benches, and there are toy boxes underneath the benches. The walls are decorated with Japanese prints, while the doorway is topped by a sculpture of the Winged Victory of Samothrace. Geometric shapes are used throughout the playroom, including on the floors. Reflecting Wright's love of music, he installed a piano in the playroom, which could be retracted into a stairwell. The room also had a fireplace with a bust depicting Venus de Milo. The mural above the fireplace, depicting a story from The Arabian Nights, was painted by Giannini.

Above the drafting room was an octagonal balcony with clerestory windows, which was accessed by a narrow stair. The balcony was supported by a "harness" of chains extending up to the ceiling rafters and outward to the clerestory walls. Adjoining the balcony were a darkroom and workrooms, where Wright's associates worked on art glass, sculptures, paintings, and photography. In 1911, five additional bedrooms were built above the drafting room and the studio office, replacing the drafting room's balcony. These were accessed by a separate stair leading to the drafting room. Also dating from this era was another apartment above the garages, which included four rooms accessed by their own stairway. During the 1970s and 1980s, the drafting room's balcony was restored, and the rooms above the studio were demolished. The balcony's railing has a quote by Rudyard Kipling, surrounding a 13-by-13-foot (4.0 by 4.0 m) square opening. In contrast to the original balcony, there are steel beams under the modern-day balcony.

== Management ==
The Wright Home and Studio is owned by the Frank Lloyd Wright Preservation Trust, a 501(c)(3) organization established in June 1974. It preserves the house and educates visitors. The trust was originally known as the Frank Lloyd Wright Home and Studio Foundation but was renamed after taking over the Robie House in 2000. The trust also maintains the Rookery Building in Chicago. Until it acquired Wright's Oak Park house and studio in 2012, the Wright Trust leased the building from the National Trust for Historic Preservation for a nominal fee.

=== Tours ===
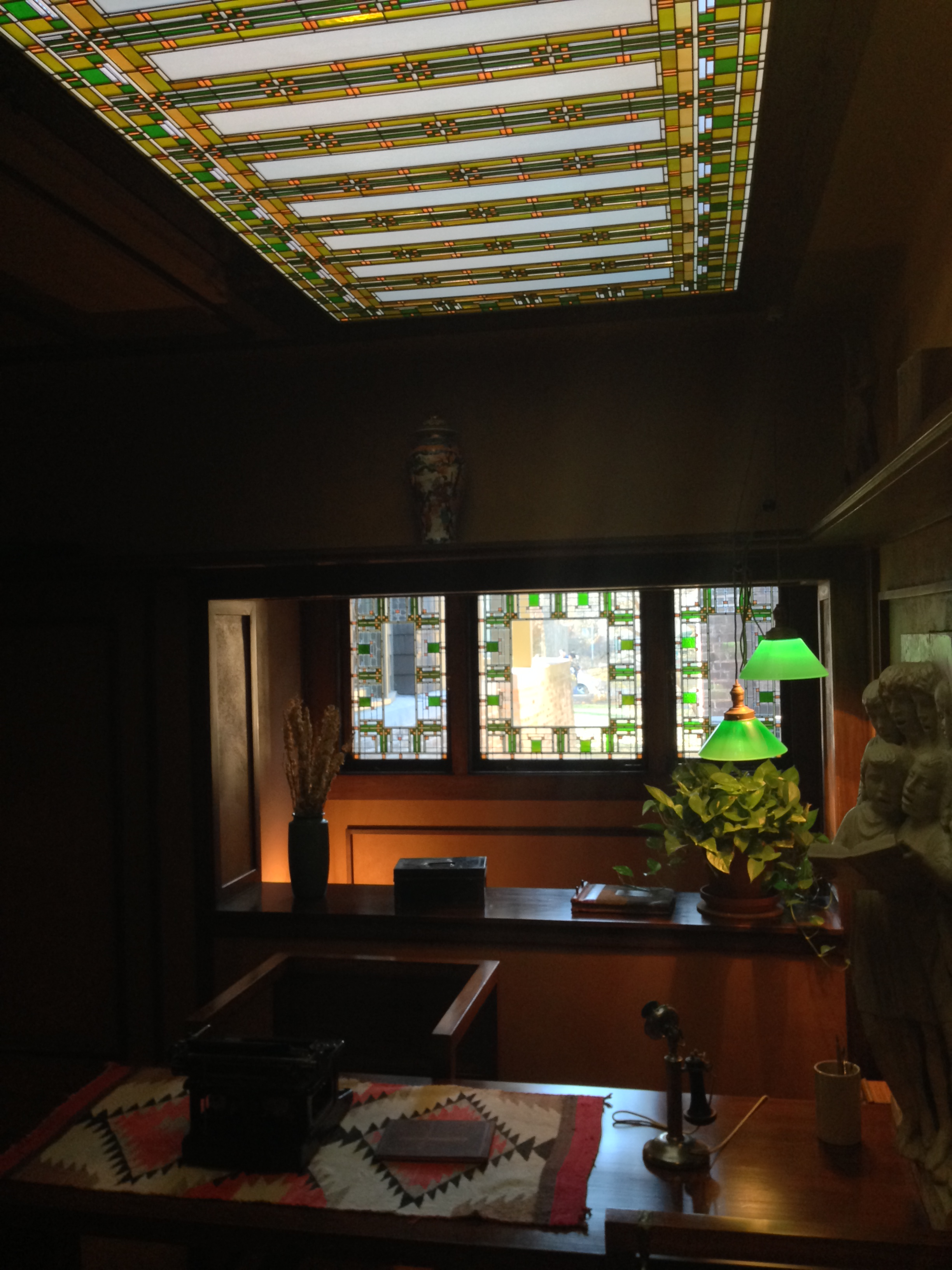
A desk in Wright's office

Tours of the building are given by a group of volunteer guides known as interpreters. Though most interpreters are adults who have undergone interviews or training, the trust has also allowed local students to lead some tours. In addition to guided 60-minute tours of the interior, the Preservation Trust hosts "restoration tours" that discuss aspects of the building's restoration.

Since 2018, the Frank Lloyd Wright Home and Studio has been part of the Frank Lloyd Wright Trail, a collection of 13 buildings designed by Wright in Illinois. The trust also began hosting tours of local buildings in February 1975. These included the annual Wright Plus walking tour, which began that year and is hosted one Saturday each May. The Wright Plus tours cover several buildings designed by Wright and contemporary architects; though the route of the tour is changed every year, the tours have always included the home and studio. There are also self-guided audio tours of other Wright buildings in Oak Park, most of which are privately owned, aside from the museum and the nearby Unity Temple. During the COVID-19 pandemic, the trust began hosting outdoor guided tours of these buildings.

=== Programs, events, and other initiatives ===
Over the years, the Home and Studio Foundation has hosted various programs, including educational workshops for youth, an architecture camp for adults, and the annual "Wright Places" tour and conference. During the Christmas holiday season, the foundation has hosted Christmas–themed events, and it has redecorated parts of the house. In addition, the foundation has assisted owners of other historic houses designed by Wright, and it has also sponsored trips to other buildings that Wright designed. Objects such as books, puzzles, and clothing are sold through the Home and Studio Museum Shop (formerly the Ginkgo Tree Bookshop). The trust holds the copyright to several pieces of merchandise, and it collects licensing fees and royalty payments from these items.

When the Wright Home and Studio Foundation was established, it acquired photographs of, and documents about, the building. By 1978, the foundation's Research Center owned 180 photographs, 275 drawings, and records of communications between different members of the Wright family. The collection expanded to include 12,000 colorized images of the building, including the renovation process.

== Impact ==
=== Architectural influence ===
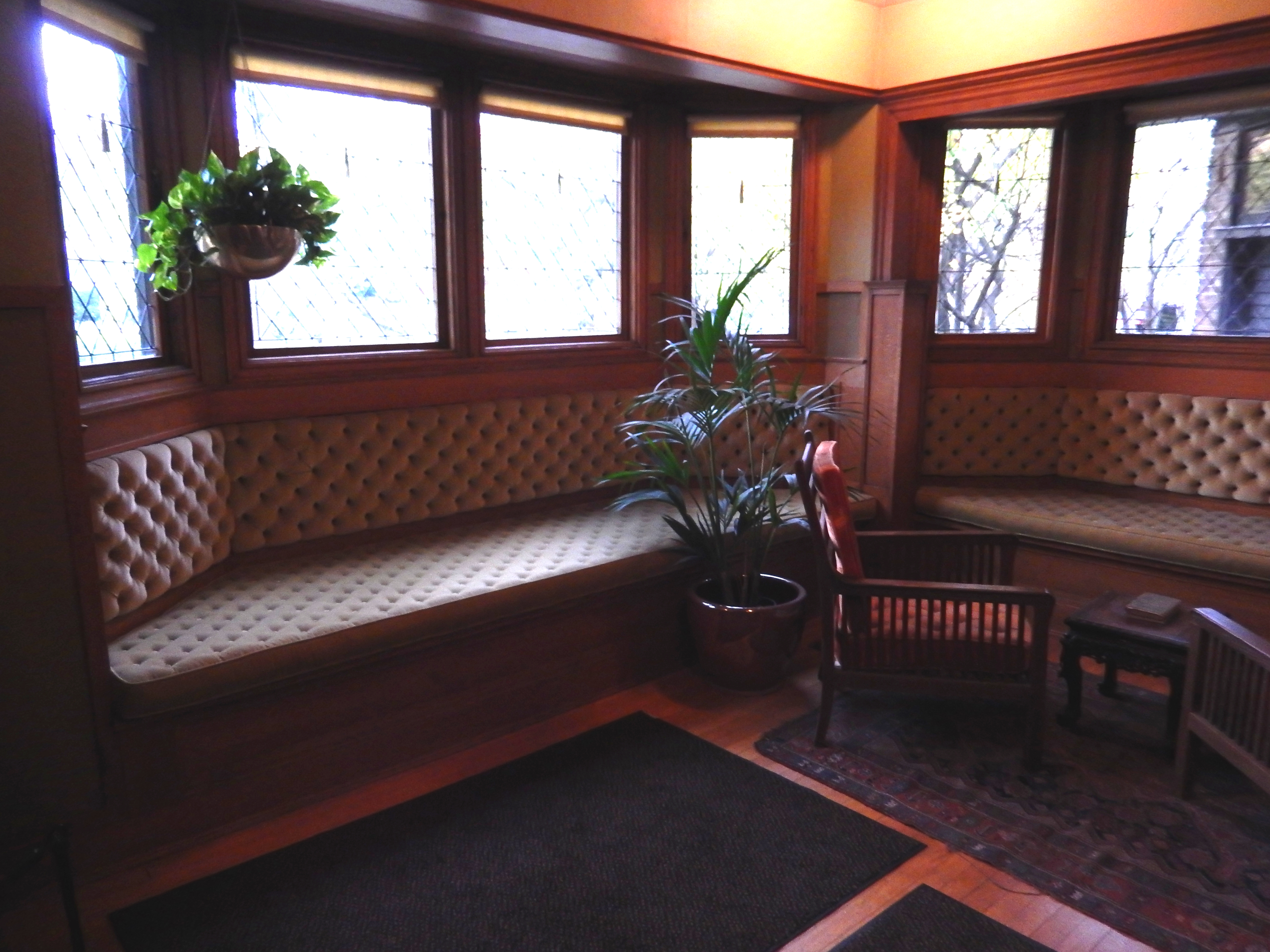
Built-in furniture was incorporated into Wright's later work. Shown here are the built-in living-room benches.

The architects at Wright's Oak Park studio are credited with having helped refine the Prairie style of architecture. One writer said that the building "became in itself an architectural model for his prairie school", while another writer state that the house and studio's design had inspired the Prairie style, similarly to how Wright's Robie House had inspired aspects of modern architecture. Many of the building's decorative details were incorporated into Wright's later work. The house's decorative details include earth-toned color palettes, open floor plans, built-in furniture, and casement windows, all of which became characteristics of his later work. His public buildings share similarities with the studio, whose design features include low entry halls leading to larger spaces, as well as mechanical systems embedded into the building's structure. The building's use of geometric motifs was also replicated in Wright's other buildings, as were design concepts such as "rooms within rooms" and indirect entryways.

The house's playroom was one of Wright's first designs with a skylight, and it marked the first time he used brick for interior walls. The playroom was the first purely-recreational space Wright ever designed; he went on to design theaters at his other studios at Taliesin and Taliesin West. The 1895 dining room was the first time Wright had designed both a room and everything inside it, as well as the first time he illuminated a room using indirect lighting. The drafting room's design predated the creation of large, naturally-illuminated rooms in other Wright buildings, such as the Solomon R. Guggenheim Museum, Johnson Wax Headquarters, Larkin Administration Building, and Unity Temple. Other features, such as built-in storage and large family rooms, became commonplace not just in Wright's work, but in American residential architecture. Conversely, after designing the barrel-vaulted ceiling in the home's playroom, Wright only ever designed one other barrel vault, in the Dana–Thomas House.

=== Reception ===
Wright's eldest son Lloyd recalled that, when he was growing up, children derided the building as "the crazy architect's house", although Lloyd could not sympathize with their perspectives. Russell Sturgis dubbed the studio "extremely ugly" and a "monster of awkwardness" in a 1904 critique of Wright's work. Local residents frequently talked about the house, which stood out from the Gothic Revival homes nearby. Though the building's design generally received positive acclaim by the late 20th century, Wright himself had regarded it as a "juvenile expression".

In 1976, a writer for The Christian Science Monitor said that Wright had "revolutionized the architecture of the world" when he was designing Prairie-style buildings at the Oak Park studio. A Wall Street Journal reporter described the building as "a rambling, marvelously varied structure" that incorporated many of the same features as Wright's later designs. Paul Goldberger wrote for The New York Times that the home and studio was "a laboratory—not a masterwork". A writer for the San Francisco Examiner said in 1982 that "the clarity of Wright's original plan is much obscured" due to the modifications over the years. After the 1980s renovation was completed, a Chicago Tribune reporter wrote that Wright's Oak Park residence "is almost quaint compared with later designs", and the Quad-City Times called the home and studio "a beautiful tribute to Wright and his revolutionary ideas". Various sources characterized the home and studio as a place where visitors could observe the beginnings of Wright's work, while other observers said that the building encapsulated Wright's style and personality.

The critic Paul Goldberger called the building "a remarkable synthesis of 19th-century Shingle Style and Wright's own developing style" in 1996, and the historian Robert McCarter said "the quality of its subtle yet unique presence" helped Wright's nascent architectural practice. In his biography of Wright, the author Brendan Gill said the building "continues to bear plausible witness to Wright's high spirits and inventiveness". A reporter for the Waterloo Region Record said in 2004 that the building "still looks like it is way ahead of its time" despite being over a century old. A New York Times reporter characterized the studio as "airy and regal" in 2015, noting that the exterior still blended in with the area around it.

=== Media and landmark designations ===
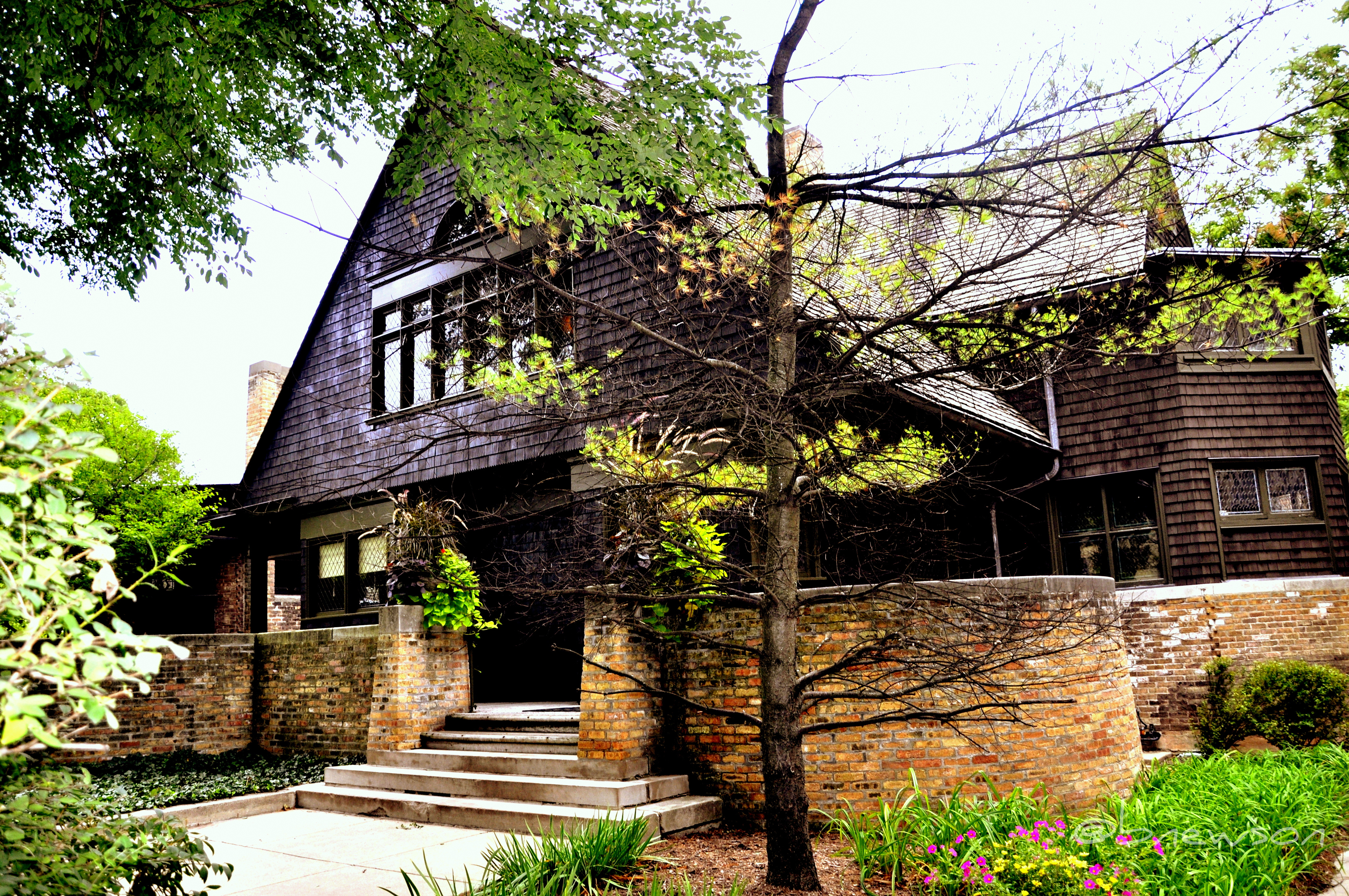
Entrance to the house

Several books have been written about the house and studio. A book about the plans for the building's restoration was published in 1979 through the University of Chicago Press, and a booklet about the structure was published in 1983. The Wright Trust took 1,500 photographs documenting the restoration itself, and the project was detailed in a 2000 book published by the Wright Trust. Other publications about the home and studio's history include a 1997 book by Kathryn Smith and a 2021 book by Lisa D. Schrenk. In addition, the building was detailed in Murray Grigor's 1982 documentary about Wright's Oak Park buildings, a 1984 episode of the PBS TV show The Old House, and a 1998 video biography by A&E Television Networks. Frank Lloyd Wright's Home and Studio, a 2009 video tour and documentary about Wright, was also set at the building, and it was used extensively as a setting for season 4, episode 5, of the TV series The Bear.

Oak Park officials considered including the Wright Home and Studio as part of a municipal historic district in 1971. The home and studio was nominated along with 54 other Prairie-style buildings in Oak Park, comprising most of the village's 61 Prairie-style structures. When the district was created the next year, the complex was located in the district's boundaries. The building is also part of the Frank Lloyd Wright–Prairie School of Architecture Historic District, a National Register of Historic Places (NRHP) district, which was established in 1973. The building was re-added to the NRHP in 1976 when it was declared a National Historic Landmark.

== See also ==
- List of Frank Lloyd Wright works
- List of National Historic Landmarks in Illinois
- National Register of Historic Places listings in Cook County, Illinois
- Frank Lloyd Wright Building Conservancy
- Frank Lloyd Wright-Prairie School of Architecture Historic District
