= Richard Bock =

American sculptor (1865-1949)

- Born: July 16, 1865; Schloppe, Germany (now Człopa, Poland)
- Died: June 29, 1949 (aged 83); Los Angeles, California, U.S.

Richard W. Bock (July 16, 1865 – June 29, 1949) was a German-born American sculptor known for his collaborations with the American architect Frank Lloyd Wright. He was particularly known for his sculptural decorations for architecture and military memorials, along with the work he conducted alongside Wright.

== Early years ==
Bock was born on July 16, 1865, in Schloppe, Germany (now Człopa, Poland), and emigrated to the United States with his family as a youth, where he grew up in German neighborhoods in Chicago.

Three years in school at the Berlin Academy studying with Schaper was followed by more studying at the École des Beaux-Arts in Paris under Alexandre Falguière and then a tour of Florence, Italy. In 1891 he returned to his American hometown of Chicago to establish a permanent sculpture studio downtown. Almost immediately upon Bock's return to America, he received three major commissions. For the World's Columbian Exposition in 1893, he sculpted major architectural works for two of the event's primary buildings, the Mining and Electricity Exposition Halls. He took on a 14-year-old apprentice, James Earle Fraser, who would later design the famous sculpture The End of the Trail and the Buffalo nickel.

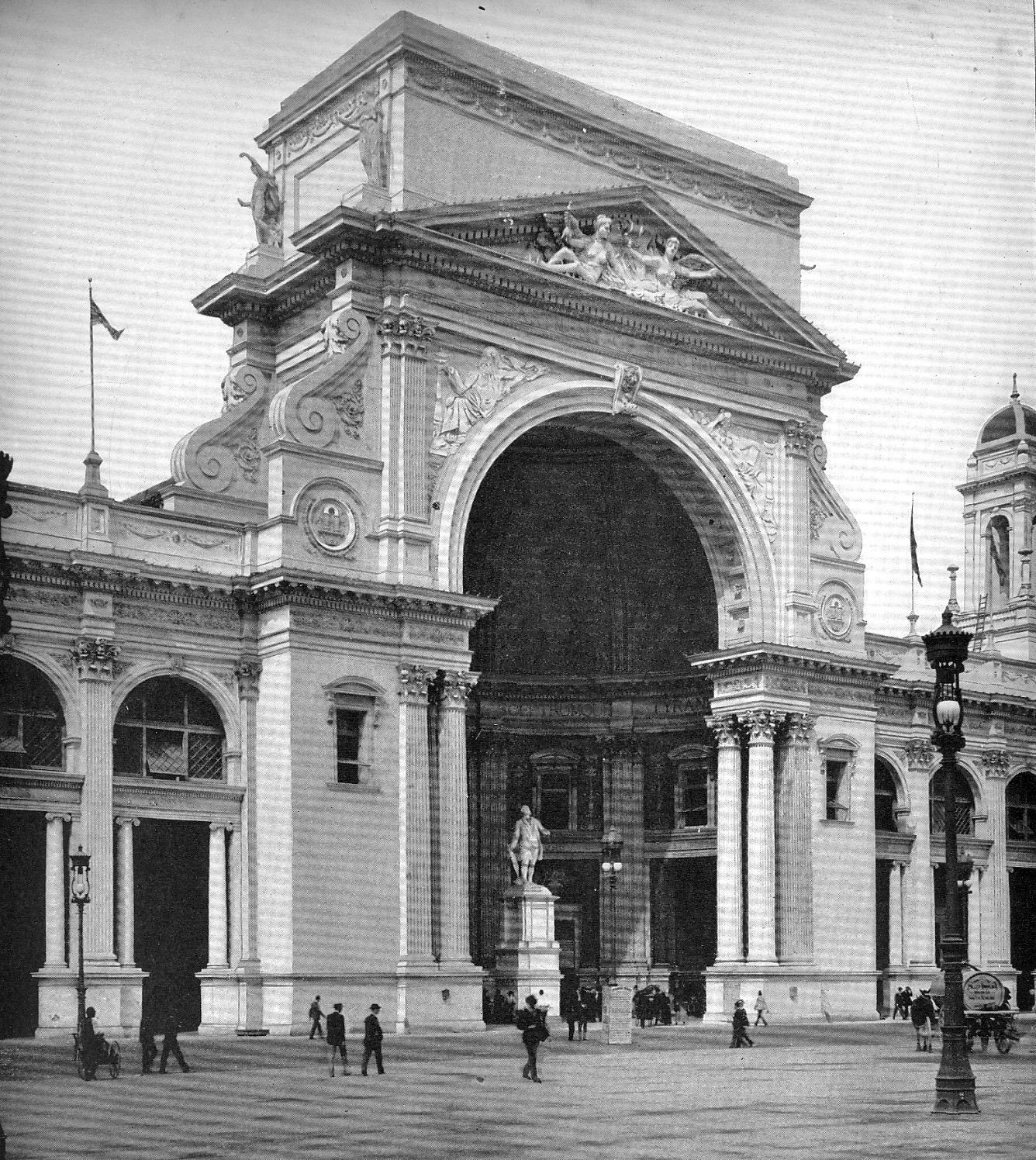
Columbian Exposition, Electricity Building

detail

Columbian Exposition Mining Building

detail

He also won a competition to execute an exterior sculpture at the Indianapolis Public Library in 1892.

He created interior bas-reliefs for Chicago's famous Schiller Building, during which time, in the winter of 1891 to 1892, Bock studied under its architect Louis Sullivan. It was in the Sullivan's office that Bock met Frank Lloyd Wright.

Missouri Building, St. Louis, 1904

Bock also created the Elijah P. Lovejoy Monument in Alton, Illinois, along with a bronze group of sculptures in Chickamauga, Georgia. For the Trans-Mississippi Exposition in Omaha, Nebraska, in 1898, Bock composed all the sculptures for the Machinery and Electricity Building, a centerpiece of the fair. At the same time, he made the pediments for Omaha's Burlington Train Station.

On November 1, 1899, Bock married Martha Higgins Methven, sister of his colleague Harry Wallace Methven. After returning from their honeymoon, Bock won a competition to help create the Illinois monument at the Shiloh Civil War battlefield. He also worked on sculptures for the Missouri State Building at the 1904 St. Louis World's Fair.

== Collaboration with Frank Lloyd Wright ==
Bock's first work for Frank Lloyd Wright was a frieze for the third floor of the Heller House in 1896. In 1898, Wright asked Bock to create sculptures for Wright's home in Oak Park, Illinois. A few years earlier, Bock had created a statue of Wright's son John. From 1903 to 1913, Bock worked almost exclusively with Wright on multiple projects, often making Wright's architectural sculptures. Wright requested Bock's assistance after a previous sculptor, Albert Louis Van den Berghen, was not working out as planned for a planned sculpture at the Dana–Thomas House. Charles E. White, Jr. wrote upon Bock's arrival at Wright's studio:

One late acquaintance, however, which gives me much pleasure, is Richard Bock, Sculptor, who has moved to Oak Park, and will occupy the balcony [of the studio]. He has decided to put himself under Mr. W[right]'s criticism for a period, as it is his ambition to become a solely Architectural Sculptor. He will do work for the Buffalo [Larkin] building ...

The two became close friends and their families often spent time together. Wright designed a sculpture studio for Bock in River Forest, Illinois, called "The Gnomes." The two worked together for over 20 years. Bock created two sculptures for the entrance to Wright's Office at his Home in Oak Park called "The Boulders" they are still visible from the street outside of Wright's House and Studio.

=== Works ===
Bock provided statues for the Dana–Thomas House in Springfield, Illinois, and a plaster frieze for the Wright-designed Heller House in Chicago. Bock also worked on Wright's Unity Temple, the integrated human figures on the 1906 Larkin Administration Building, two statues for the Darwin D. Martin House in Buffalo, New York, and the sculptural program at the Midway Gardens in Chicago, which Bock supervised.

The Horse Show Fountain in Scoville Park in Oak Park, Illinois, sometimes called the Wright-Bock Fountain, is generally believed to be a product of Bock, but the actual attribution is a bit fuzzy. Donald P. Hallmark, a Bock historian, stated the fountain was designed by Bock between 1907 and 1908 but with the help of famous architect Frank Lloyd Wright. It was Bock himself who suggested that it was Wright who pushed for the central opening in the fountain, and thus he "began to lay claim to the whole project." The Frank Lloyd Wright Foundation claims the work as a Wright design from 1903. The Frank Lloyd Wright Preservation Trust lists Wright as the architect and Bock as the sculptor.

In 1969, the badly deteriorated original fountain was reconstructed and a replica of Bock's work placed in Scoville Park at the corner of Oak Park Avenue and Lake Street in Oak Park.

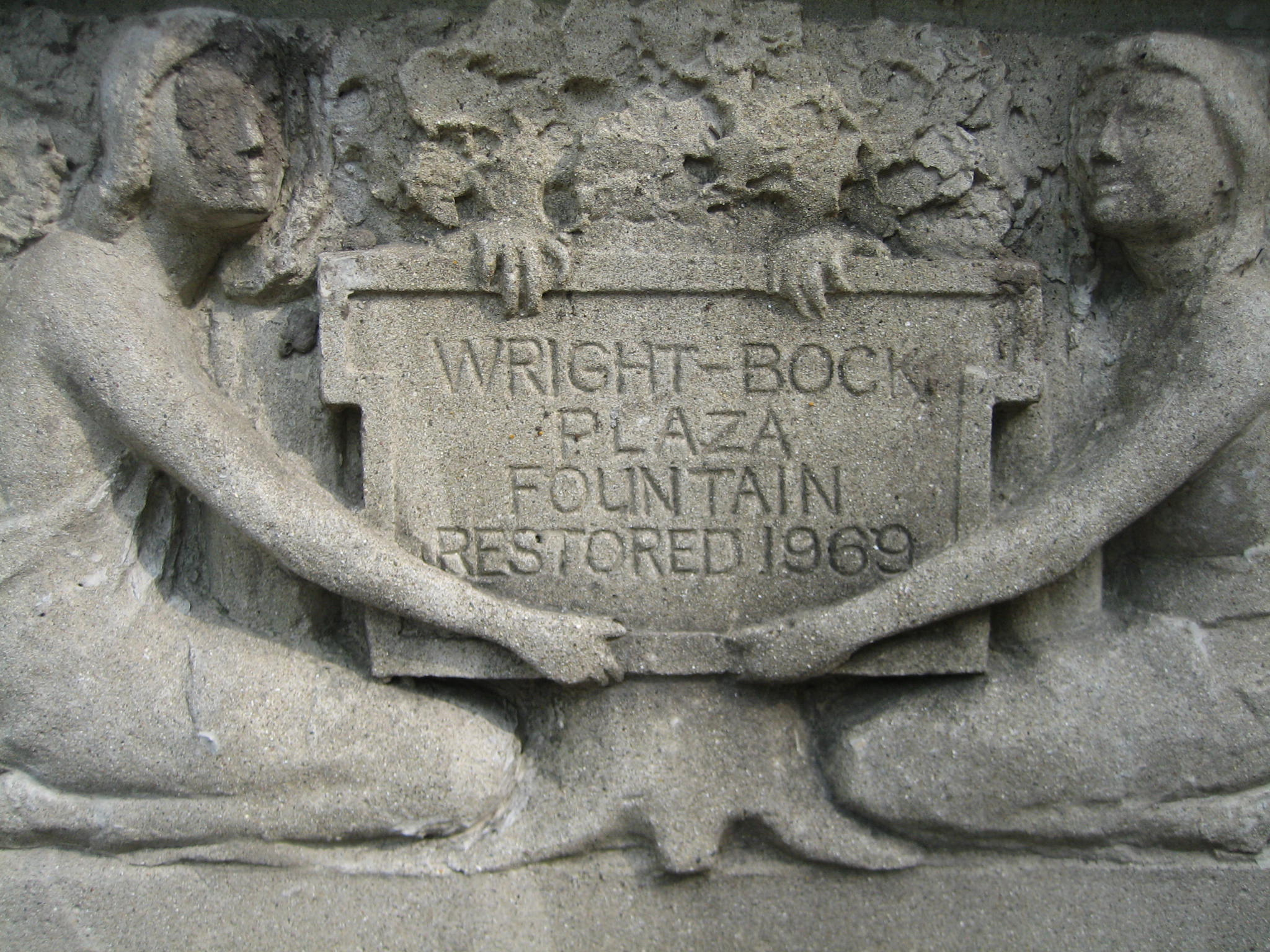
The Horse Show Fountain's replica relief sculpture which echoes the original work by Bock, c. 1906

== Later years ==
Bock spent three years creating the figures for the Hippach Chapel at Chapel Hill Gardens West in Villa Park, Illinois. In 1929, he became the head of the Sculptural Department at the University of Oregon. After retiring in 1932, he completed his career with a possible design for a colossus for the 1933 Century of Progress exposition in Chicago.

In the 1940s, Bock and his wife moved to California, where he completed his autobiography. He died at the age of 84 in 1949, of Parkinson's disease.

== Bock Museum ==
Dr. Donald Hallmark, a researcher at Greenville College in Greenville, Illinois, became interested in Bock and learned that his works did not have a permanent home in a museum. He contacted the sculptor's children, who remained in possession of the collection. The children, Thorwald Methven and Dorathi Bock Pierre, donated the collection to Greenville College in 1972 on the condition that the collection always remain on display. The Richard W. Bock Sculpture Collection includes more than 300 drawings, documents and photographs, and most importantly, over 300 bronze and plaster sculptures of Bock's. In addition, some of Frank Lloyd Wright's work which had never before been displayed became part of the collection. Renovated in 2007, the Bock museum has been redesigned as a more fitting home for Bock's masterpieces. The works include an outdoor sculpture, Spring; the Darwin D. Martin House in Buffalo, New York, commissioned a copy to be made of the sculpture in 2008, as part of its $50 million remodeling project.
