= National Register of Historic Places listings in Cook County, Illinois =

This is a list of the 141 National Register of Historic Places listings in Cook County, Illinois outside Chicago and Evanston. Separate lists are provided for the 62 listed properties and historic districts in Evanston and the more than 350 listed properties and districts in Chicago. The Chicago Sanitary and Ship Canal Historic District extends through the West Side of Chicago, DuPage County and Will County to Lockport.

This National Park Service list is complete through NPS recent listings posted November 13, 2026.

== Current listings ==
=== Other parts of Cook County ===
	Name on the Register	Image	Date listed	Location	City or town	Description
1	Mrs. Henry F. Akin House	Mrs. Henry F. Akin House	May 22, 1992 (#92000487)	901 S. 8th Ave. 41°52′46″N 87°50′31″W	Maywood	
2	American State Bank	American State Bank	October 5, 2000 (#00000951)	6801 W. Cermak Rd. 41°51′01″N 87°47′37″W	Berwyn	
3	Arcade Building	Arcade Building	March 8, 2016 (#16000055)	1 Riverside Rd. 41°49′38″N 87°49′10″W	Riverside	
4	Baha'i Temple	Baha'i Temple	May 23, 1978 (#78001140)	100 Linden Ave. 42°04′27″N 87°41′03″W	Wilmette	
5	Bailey–Michelet House	Bailey–Michelet House	August 12, 1982 (#82002533)	1028 Sheridan Rd. 42°04′52″N 87°41′40″W	Wilmette	
6	Frank J. Baker House	Frank J. Baker House	November 8, 1974 (#74000759)	507 Lake Ave. 42°04′42″N 87°41′40″W	Wilmette	
7	Hiram Baldwin House	Hiram Baldwin House	July 28, 1983 (#83000307)	205 Essex Rd. 42°05′12″N 87°42′34″W	Kenilworth	
8	Nathaniel Moore Banta House	Nathaniel Moore Banta House	May 20, 1998 (#98000465)	514 N. Vail Ave. 42°05′17″N 87°59′04″W	Arlington Heights	
9	Baptist Retirement Home	Baptist Retirement Home	October 26, 2017 (#100001765)	316 Randolph St. 41°53′04″N 87°50′14″W	Maywood	
10	Barrington Historic District	Barrington Historic District	May 16, 1986 (#86001047)	Roughly bounded by Chicago & Northwestern RR, S. Spring and Grove Sts., E. Hillside and W. Coolidge, and Dundee Aves. 42°09′02″N 88°08′13″W	Barrington	
11	Benda House	Benda House	August 21, 2023 (#100009252)	211 Southcote Rd. 41°50′20″N 87°48′48″W	Riverside	
12	Alfred Bersbach House	Alfred Bersbach House	September 17, 2003 (#03000941)	1120 Michigan Ave. 42°04′59″N 87°41′41″W	Wilmette	
13	Berwyn Health Center	Berwyn Health Center	November 21, 2002 (#02001352)	6600 W. 26th St. 41°50′36″N 87°47′17″W	Berwyn	
14	Berwyn Municipal Building	Berwyn Municipal Building	August 8, 2001 (#01000865)	6700 W. 26th St. 41°50′35″N 87°47′28″W	Berwyn	
15	Bloom Township High School	Bloom Township High School	June 3, 1982 (#82002527)	10th St. & Dixie Hwy; 41°30′52″N 87°38′37″W	Chicago Heights	
16	Jacob Bohlander House	Jacob Bohlander House	August 21, 1989 (#89001113)	316 N. 4th Ave. 41°53′27″N 87°50′18″W	Maywood	
17	Edmund D. Brigham House	Edmund D. Brigham House	December 27, 2016 (#16000900)	790 Sheridan Rd. 42°08′22″N 87°45′18″W	Glencoe	
18	Anita Willets Burnham Log House	Anita Willets Burnham Log House	June 2, 2005 (#04001297)	1140 Willow Rd. 42°06′02″N 87°44′51″W	Winnetka	
19	Burr Oak Cemetery Historic District	Burr Oak Cemetery Historic District	January 2, 2026 (#100012473)	4400 W. 127th Street; 41°39′45″N 87°43′47″W	Alsip	
20	Mr. James Kent Calhoun House	Mr. James Kent Calhoun House	June 7, 2010 (#09000780)	740 Greenwood Ave. 42°08′03″N 87°45′45″W	Glencoe	
21	Central Berwyn Bungalow Historic District	Central Berwyn Bungalow Historic District	August 18, 2015 (#15000521)	Roughly bounded by Cermak Rd., Home, Ridgeland & Cuyler Aves., 26th St. 41°50′47″N 87°47′22″W	Berwyn	
22	Chicago and Northwestern Depot	Chicago and Northwestern Depot	April 24, 1975 (#75000658)	1135-1141 Wilmette Ave. 42°04′39″N 87°42′20″W	Wilmette	
23	Chicago Portage National Historic Site	Chicago Portage National Historic Site	October 15, 1966 (#66000108)	S. Harlem Ave. at Chicago Sanitary and Ship Canal; 41°48′39″N 87°48′28″W	Forest View	
24	Chicago Sanitary and Ship Canal Historic District	Chicago Sanitary and Ship Canal Historic District	December 20, 2011 (#11000907)	Illinois Waterway miles 290.0-321.7; 41°50′05″N 87°41′42″W	Cicero, Stickney, Forest View, Summit, Willow Springs, Lemont	part of the Illinois Waterway Navigation System Facilities MPS; extends through the West Side of Chicago, DuPage County and Will County to Lockport
25	George Clayson House	George Clayson House	March 21, 1979 (#79000835)	224 E. Palatine Rd. 42°06′39″N 88°02′18″W	Palatine	
26	Richard Cluever House	Richard Cluever House	November 17, 1977 (#77000482)	601 N. 1st Ave. 41°53′35″N 87°50′01″W	Maywood	
27	Community House	Community House	August 30, 2007 (#07000854)	620 Lincoln Ave. 42°06′29″N 87°44′00″W	Winnetka	
28	Avery Coonley House	Avery Coonley House	December 30, 1970 (#70000243)	290 and 300 Scottswood Rd., 281 Bloomingbank Rd., and 336 Coonley St. 41°49′14″N 87°49′43″W	Riverside	
29	Dr. Joseph Carter Corbin Gravesite	Dr. Joseph Carter Corbin Gravesite	April 17, 2023 (#100008842)	863 Des Plaines Ave. (Forest Home Cemetery); 41°52′13″N 87°49′03″W	Forest Park	
30	Crow Island School	Crow Island School	October 27, 1989 (#89001730)	1112 Willow Rd. 42°06′01″N 87°44′47″W	Winnetka	
31	Dempster Street Station	Dempster Street Station	February 28, 1996 (#95001005)	5001 W. Dempster St. 42°02′25″N 87°45′08″W	Skokie	
32	Des Plaines Methodist Camp Ground	Des Plaines Methodist Camp Ground	May 22, 2005 (#05000429)	1250 Campground Rd. 42°02′00″N 87°53′21″W	Des Plaines	
33	Herbert A. Dilg House	Herbert A. Dilg House	September 30, 2009 (#09000781)	8544 Callie Ave. 42°02′13″N 87°47′02″W	Morton Grove	
34	Dohrmann-Buckman House	Dohrmann-Buckman House	January 24, 1995 (#94001598)	8455 W. Grand Ave. 41°55′45″N 87°50′16″W	River Grove	Misspelled as Dorhmann-Buckman House on the National Register
35	Robert and Suzanne Drucker House	Robert and Suzanne Drucker House	September 18, 2013 (#13000715)	2801 Iroquois Rd. 42°04′54″N 87°44′41″W	Wilmette	
36	William E. Drummond House	William E. Drummond House	March 5, 1970 (#70000241)	559 Edgewood Pl. 41°53′23″N 87°49′38″W	River Forest	
37	Arthur J. Dunham House	Arthur J. Dunham House	February 11, 1982 (#82002524)	3131 S. Wisconsin Ave. 41°50′06″N 87°48′01″W	Berwyn	
38	Edward Hines, Jr., Veterans Administration Hospital Historic District	Edward Hines, Jr., Veterans Administration Hospital Historic District	October 9, 2013 (#13000814)	5000 S. 5th Ave. 41°51′40″N 87°50′29″W	Hines	United States Second Generation Veterans Hospitals MPS
39	Emmanuel Episcopal Church	Emmanuel Episcopal Church	December 28, 2017 (#100001922)	203 S. Kensington Ave. 41°48′37″N 87°52′28″W	La Grange	
40	First Congregational Church, Des Plaines	First Congregational Church, Des Plaines	August 27, 2019 (#100004310)	766 Graceland Ave. 42°02′21″N 87°53′30″W	Des Plaines	
41	First Congregational Church of Western Springs	First Congregational Church of Western Springs	August 8, 2006 (#06000673)	1106 Chestnut St. 41°48′53″N 87°54′11″W	Western Springs	
42	Flat Iron Building	Flat Iron Building	September 13, 2003 (#03000917)	1441-1449 Emerald Ave. 41°30′16″N 87°38′05″W	Chicago Heights	Demolished in 2009.
43	Ford Airport Hangar	Ford Airport Hangar	May 9, 1985 (#85001009)	Glenwood-Lansing Rd. and Burnham Ave. 41°32′32″N 87°32′18″W	Lansing	
44	William Frangenheim House	William Frangenheim House	May 22, 1992 (#92000488)	410 N. 3rd Ave. 41°53′29″N 87°50′14″W	Maywood	
45	Mrs. Thomas H. Gale House	Mrs. Thomas H. Gale House	March 5, 1970 (#70000239)	6 Elizabeth Ct. 41°53′31″N 87°47′54″W	Oak Park	
46	Walter Gale House	Walter Gale House	August 17, 1973 (#73000700)	1031 W. Chicago Ave. 41°53′38″N 87°48′07″W	Oak Park	
47	William and Caroline Gibbs House	William and Caroline Gibbs House	February 24, 1992 (#92000048)	515 N. 3rd Ave. 41°53′32″N 87°50′12″W	Maywood	
48	Gillson Park and Wilmette Harbor Historic District	Gillson Park and Wilmette Harbor Historic District	May 2, 2024 (#100009684)	Michigan Avenue and Sheridan Road; 42°04′42″N 87°41′18″W	Wilmette	
49	William A. Glasner House	William A. Glasner House	February 28, 2005 (#05000105)	850 Sheridan Rd. 42°08′29″N 87°45′19″W	Glencoe	
50	Dr. Paul W. and Eunice Greeley House	Dr. Paul W. and Eunice Greeley House	February 25, 2011 (#11000048)	545 Oak St. 42°06′17″N 87°43′31″W	Winnetka	
51	Gross Point Village Hall	Gross Point Village Hall	August 5, 1991 (#91001001)	609 Ridge Rd. 42°04′33″N 87°43′22″W	Wilmette	Home of the Wilmette Historical Museum; Gross Point Village Hall
52	Grossdale Station	Grossdale Station	June 15, 1982 (#82004912)	8820½ Brookfield Ave. 41°49′23″N 87°50′33″W	Brookfield	
53	Caroline Grow House	Caroline Grow House	May 22, 1992 (#92000489)	603 N. 6th Ave. 41°53′34″N 87°50′25″W	Maywood	
54	Gunderson Historic District	Gunderson Historic District	March 1, 2002 (#02000100)	Oldest section, 1000 and 1100 S. Home and Wenonah Avenues. Later section bounded by Madison St, Harrison, Gunderson, and Ridgeland Aves. 41°52′34″N 87°47′08″W	Oak Park	The first homes of steel-beamed construction and some of the first tract homes in the U.S., many historical occupants.
55	Hangar 1, Naval Air Station-Glenview	Hangar 1, Naval Air Station-Glenview	November 12, 1998 (#98001357)	1901 Fourth St. 42°05′26″N 87°49′26″W	Glenview	
56	Harrer Building	Harrer Building	February 17, 1983 (#83000310)	8051 N. Lincoln Ave. 42°01′39″N 87°45′14″W	Skokie	
57	William H. Hatch House	William H. Hatch House	September 5, 2007 (#07000898)	309 Keystone Ave. 41°53′12″N 87°49′05″W	River Forest	
58	Haymarket Martyrs' Monument	Haymarket Martyrs' Monument	February 18, 1997 (#97000343)	863 S. Des Plaines Ave. 41°52′12″N 87°49′20″W	Forest Park	
59	Craig and Estella Hazelwood House		April 17, 2024 (#100010216)	16 Canterbury Court; 42°04′21″N 87°40′52″W	Wilmette	
60	The Richard E. and Charlotte Henrich House		December 27, 2023 (#100009685)	24 Brinker Road; 42°08′46″N 88°10′30″W	Barrington Hills	
61	Arthur Heurtley House	Arthur Heurtley House	February 16, 2000 (#00000258)	318 N. Forest Avenue; 41°53′35″N 87°48′01″W	Oak Park	
62	Dr. Robert Hohf House	Dr. Robert Hohf House	December 12, 2008 (#08001166)	303 Sheridan Rd. 42°05′31″N 87°42′25″W	Kenilworth	
63	Hofmann Tower	Hofmann Tower	December 22, 1978 (#78001139)	3910 Barry Point Rd. 41°49′14″N 87°49′19″W	Lyons	
64	John Humphrey House	John Humphrey House	August 1, 2005 (#05000114)	9830 W. 144th Pl. 41°37′48″N 87°51′34″W	Orland Park	
65	The Hunt Club		December 30, 2024 (#100011202)	6615 Roosevelt Rd. 41°51′55″N 87°47′23″W	Berwyn	
66	Illinois Industrial School for Girls	Illinois Industrial School for Girls	August 6, 1998 (#98000978)	733 N. Prospect Ave. 42°01′18″N 87°49′40″W	Park Ridge	Former home to the Illinois Industrial School for Girls; closed 2012; became Prospect Park
67	Kenilworth Club	Kenilworth Club	March 21, 1979 (#79000832)	410 Kenilworth Ave. 42°05′11″N 87°42′57″W	Kenilworth	
68	Kennicott's Grove	Kennicott's Grove	August 13, 1973 (#73000698)	Milwaukee and Lake Aves. 42°04′53″N 87°51′30″W	Glenview	
69	Louis B. Kuppenheimer Jr. House		December 4, 2017 (#98000980)	789 Burr Ave. 42°06′46″N 87°44′42″W	Winnetka	Designed by David Adler
70	La Grange Village Historic District	La Grange Village Historic District	August 8, 1979 (#79000834)	U.S. 12; 41°48′37″N 87°52′22″W	La Grange	
71	Mads C. Larson House	Mads C. Larson House	May 22, 1992 (#92000490)	318 S. 1st Ave. 41°53′05″N 87°50′05″W	Maywood	
72	The Leaning Tower of Niles	The Leaning Tower of Niles	April 17, 2019 (#100003645)	6280 W. Touhy Ave. 42°00′45″N 87°47′02″W	Niles	
73	Lemont Central Grade School	Lemont Central Grade School	March 7, 1975 (#75000656)	410 McCarthy Rd. 41°40′21″N 87°59′50″W	Lemont	
74	Lemont Downtown Historic District	Lemont Downtown Historic District	September 6, 2016 (#16000582)	Roughly bounded by Main, Stephen, Illinois, River and Front Sts. 41°40′28″N 88°00′01″W	Lemont	
75	Lemont Methodist Episcopal Church	Lemont Methodist Episcopal Church	May 5, 1986 (#86001031)	306 Lemont St. 41°40′23″N 88°00′00″W	Lemont	
76	Linden Avenue Terminal	Linden Avenue Terminal	February 8, 1984 (#84001002)	330 Linden Ave. 42°04′25″N 87°41′30″W	Wilmette	
77	Eli and Jeanne Lipman House		April 16, 2025 (#100011691)	2633 Kenilworth Avenue; 42°05′12″N 87°44′29″W	Wilmette	
78	Henry Demarest Lloyd House	Henry Demarest Lloyd House	November 13, 1966 (#66000320)	830 Sheridan Rd. 42°06′51″N 87°43′56″W	Winnetka	NHL name is The Wayside
79	Timothy J. Lynch House	Timothy J. Lynch House	February 24, 1992 (#92000047)	416 N. 4th Ave. 41°53′29″N 87°50′18″W	Maywood	
80	Lyons Township Hall	Lyons Township Hall	November 30, 1978 (#78001138)	53 S. LaGrange Rd. 41°48′50″N 87°52′09″W	La Grange	Known as the LaGrange Village Hall
81	George W. Maher House	George W. Maher House	March 21, 1979 (#79000833)	424 Warwick Rd. 42°05′24″N 87°42′47″W	Kenilworth	
82	Marshall Field and Company Store	Marshall Field and Company Store	January 21, 1988 (#87002510)	1144 W. Lake St; also 1136-1150 Lake Street; 41°53′21″N 87°48′16″W	Oak Park	Second set of addresses represent a boundary increase approved April 9, 20,255.
83	Masonic Temple Building	Masonic Temple Building	May 22, 1992 (#92000491)	200 S. 5th Ave. 41°53′09″N 87°50′22″W	Maywood	
84	Masonic Temple Building	Masonic Temple Building	February 11, 1982 (#82002532)	119-137 N. Oak Park Ave. 41°53′17″N 87°47′41″W	Oak Park	
85	Lola Maverick Lloyd House	Lola Maverick Lloyd House	February 1, 2006 (#05001606)	455 Birch St. 42°06′21″N 87°44′12″W	Winnetka	
86	Maywood Fire Department Building	Maywood Fire Department Building	May 22, 1992 (#92000492)	511 St. Charles Rd. 41°53′17″N 87°50′24″W	Maywood	
87	William McJunkin House	William McJunkin House	March 2, 2006 (#06000104)	151 Sheridan Rd. 42°05′44″N 87°42′43″W	Winnetka	
88	Caroline Millward House	Caroline Millward House	May 22, 1992 (#92000493)	502 N. 5th Ave. 41°53′31″N 87°50′22″W	Maywood	
89	John Rogerson Montgomery House	John Rogerson Montgomery House	September 15, 2004 (#04000974)	15 Old Green Bay Rd. 42°07′20″N 87°44′32″W	Glencoe	
90	J. Sterling Morton High School East Auditorium	J. Sterling Morton High School East Auditorium	May 9, 1983 (#83000312)	2423 S. Austin Blvd. 41°50′47″N 87°46′23″W	Cicero	
91	Muller House	Muller House	March 26, 1979 (#79000819)	500 N. Vail Ave. 42°05′15″N 87°59′04″W	Arlington Heights	
92	Arno and Verna Myers House		April 27, 2026 (#100012944)	1207 Whitebridge Hill Road; 42°07′30″N 87°44′25″W	Winnetka	
93	Harry H. Nichols House	Harry H. Nichols House	February 24, 1992 (#92000045)	216 S. 4th Ave. 41°53′08″N 87°50′17″W	Maywood	
94	Mr. J. William de Coursey O'Grady House	Mr. J. William de Coursey O'Grady House	December 12, 2008 (#08001167)	149 Kenilworth Ave. 42°05′29″N 87°42′43″W	Kenilworth	
95	Oak Circle Historic District	Oak Circle Historic District	June 21, 2001 (#01000668)	318-351 Oak Circle; 42°04′20″N 87°42′39″W	Wilmette	
96	Oak Park Conservatory	Oak Park Conservatory	March 8, 2005 (#04001298)	615 Garfield St. 41°52′18″N 87°47′23″W	Oak Park	
97	Oak Park Village Hall	Oak Park Village Hall	August 25, 2014 (#14000505)	123 Madison St. 41°52′46″N 87°46′44″W	Oak Park	
98	Octagon House	Octagon House	March 21, 1979 (#79000820)	223 W. Main St. 42°09′14″N 88°08′20″W	Barrington	
99	Olympia Fields Country Club	Olympia Fields Country Club	February 9, 2001 (#01000082)	2800 Country Club Dr. 41°30′57″N 87°41′06″W	Olympia Fields	
100	Orth House	Orth House	October 8, 1976 (#76000708)	42 Abbotsford Rd. 42°05′31″N 87°43′10″W	Winnetka	
101	Ouilmette North Historic District	Ouilmette North Historic District	December 6, 2005 (#05001370)	46 blocks: Chesnut Ave, Sheridan Road, Lake Ave. and 13th St. 42°04′55″N 87°42′03″W	Wilmette	Named for Antoine Ouilmette (1760–1841)
102	Pacesetter Gardens Historic District	Pacesetter Gardens Historic District	November 16, 2005 (#05001252)	13604-13736 S. Lowe Ave. 41°38′48″N 87°38′14″W	Riverdale	
103	Charles H. Patten House	Charles H. Patten House	November 8, 2006 (#06001018)	117 N. Benton St. 42°06′45″N 88°02′28″W	Palatine	
104	Pickwick Theater Building	Pickwick Theater Building	February 24, 1975 (#75000657)	5 S. Prospect Ave. 42°00′38″N 87°49′45″W	Park Ridge	
105	Pleasant Home	Pleasant Home	June 19, 1972 (#72000454)	217 Home Ave. 41°53′08″N 87°48′00″W	Oak Park	NHL name is John Farson House
106	George E. Purple House	George E. Purple House	August 12, 2005 (#05000845)	338 Sunset Ave. 41°48′36″N 87°53′02″W	LaGrange	
107	Charles N. Ramsey and Herry E. Weese House	Charles N. Ramsey and Herry E. Weese House	April 1, 2009 (#09000167)	141 Kenilworth Ave. 42°05′30″N 87°42′39″W	Kenilworth	
108	Ravisloe Country Club		September 1, 2021 (#100006865)	18231 Park Ave. 41°33′42″N 87°40′15″W	Homewood	
109	Ridgeland-Oak Park Historic District	Ridgeland-Oak Park Historic District	December 8, 1983 (#83003564)	Roughly bounded by Austin Blvd., Harlem, Ridgeland, and Chicago Aves., Lake and Madison Sts. 41°53′07″N 87°47′18″W	Oak Park	
110	River Forest Historic District	River Forest Historic District	August 26, 1977 (#77000483)	Between Harlem Ave. and Des Plaines River with 2 extensions N of Chicago Ave. and 2 extensions S of Lake St. 41°53′31″N 87°49′09″W	River Forest	
111	Riverside Landscape Architecture District	Riverside Landscape Architecture District	September 15, 1969 (#69000055)	Bounded by 26th St., Harlem and Ogden Aves., the Des Plaines River, and Forbes Rd. 41°49′39″N 87°49′15″W	Riverside	NHL name is Riverside Historic District
112	John Robertson Jr. House	John Robertson Jr. House	December 22, 2014 (#14001064)	145 W. Main St. 42°09′14″N 88°08′17″W	Barrington	
113	Robinson House	Robinson House	February 24, 1992 (#92000046)	602 N. 3rd Ave. 41°53′35″N 87°50′14″W	Maywood	
114	The Rockwell House		August 16, 2024 (#100010711)	20841 Oak Lane Dr. 41°30′36″N 87°42′14″W	Olympia Fields	
115	Root-Badger House	Root-Badger House	May 19, 1992 (#92000550)	326 Essex Rd. 42°05′18″N 87°42′46″W	Kenilworth	
116	St. James Catholic Church and Cemetery	St. James Catholic Church and Cemetery	August 16, 1984 (#84001047)	106th St. and Archer Ave. 41°41′55″N 87°55′57″W	Lemont	
117	Paul Schweikher House and Studio	Paul Schweikher House and Studio	February 17, 1987 (#87000098)	645 S. Meacham Rd. 42°00′51″N 88°02′36″W	Schaumburg	
118	Scoville Park	Scoville Park	November 21, 2002 (#02001351)	Jct. of Lake St. and Oak Park Ave. 41°53′23″N 87°47′42″W	Oak Park	
119	Shilling Building		September 28, 2026 (#100013441)	16074 South Park Avenue; 41°36′12″N 87°36′27″W	South Holland	
120	Mr. Robert Silhan House	Mr. Robert Silhan House	February 20, 2007 (#07000062)	3728 S. Cuyler Ave. 41°49′28″N 87°46′53″W	Berwyn	
121	Albert Soffel House	Albert Soffel House	May 22, 1992 (#92000494)	508 N. 5th Ave. 41°53′32″N 87°50′23″W	Maywood	
122	Jesse L. Strauss Estate	Jesse L. Strauss Estate	December 22, 2014 (#14001065)	110 Maple Hill Rd. 42°08′33″N 87°45′19″W	Glencoe	
123	Joseph P. O. Sullivan House	Joseph P. O. Sullivan House	May 22, 1992 (#92000495)	142 S. 17th Ave. 41°53′10″N 87°51′15″W	Maywood	
124	Sunderlage Farm Smokehouse	Sunderlage Farm Smokehouse	February 20, 1990 (#89001210)	1775 Vista Walk; 42°03′05″N 88°07′24″W	Hoffman Estates	
125	Sylvan Road Bridge	Sylvan Road Bridge	June 23, 1978 (#78001137)	Sylvan Rd. 42°08′40″N 87°45′48″W	Glencoe	Demolished.
126	Frank Thomas House	Frank Thomas House	September 14, 1972 (#72000455)	210 Forest Ave. 41°53′28″N 87°47′48″W	Oak Park	
127	Jennie S. Thompkins House	Jennie S. Thompkins House	May 22, 1992 (#92000496)	503 N. 4th Ave. 41°53′28″N 87°50′23″W	Maywood	
128	George R. Thorne House	George R. Thorne House	May 2, 1997 (#97000381)	7 Cottage Row; 41°37′58″N 87°45′03″W	Midlothian	
129	F.F. Tomek House	F.F. Tomek House	January 20, 1999 (#99000632)	150 Nuttall Road; 41°49′56″N 87°49′02″W	Riverside	
130	Twin Tower Sanctuary	Twin Tower Sanctuary	November 16, 1988 (#88002235)	9967 W. 144th St. 41°37′43″N 87°51′46″W	Orland Park	
131	Unity Temple	Unity Temple	April 17, 1970 (#70000240)	875 Lake St. 41°53′18″N 87°47′48″W	Oak Park	
132	Robert Vial House	Robert Vial House	August 31, 2007 (#07000853)	7425 S. Wolf Rd. 41°45′17″N 87°53′45″W	Burr Ridge	
133	Karl Vogt Building	Karl Vogt Building	January 21, 1988 (#87002499)	6811 Hickory St. 41°34′29″N 87°47′04″W	Tinley Park	
134	Western Springs Water Tower	Western Springs Water Tower	June 4, 1981 (#81000219)	914 Hillgrove Ave. 41°48′35″N 87°54′03″W	Western Springs	
135	Wheeler-Magnus Round Barn	Wheeler-Magnus Round Barn	August 18, 1992 (#92001017)	811 E. Central Rd. 42°03′53″N 87°58′19″W	Arlington Heights	
136	Wild Flower and Bird Sanctuary in Mahoney Park	Wild Flower and Bird Sanctuary in Mahoney Park	April 10, 1985 (#85000772)	Sheridan Rd. & 10th Street; 42°05′21″N 87°42′12″W	Kenilworth	
137	Wilmette Village Center Historic District		July 6, 2023 (#100008874)	1200 blk. of Washington Ct.; 1100 blks. of Central and Wilmette Aves.; 700 block of 12th St. 42°04′38″N 87°42′26″W	Wilmette	
138	William H. Winslow House and Stable	William H. Winslow House and Stable	April 17, 1970 (#70000242)	515 Auvergne Pl. 41°53′19″N 87°49′44″W	River Forest	
139	Frank Lloyd Wright House and Studio	Frank Lloyd Wright House and Studio	September 14, 1972 (#72000456)	428 Forest Ave. (house), 951 Chicago Ave. (studio); 41°53′39″N 87°48′00″W	Oak Park	
140	Frank Lloyd Wright-Prairie School of Architecture Historic District	Frank Lloyd Wright-Prairie School of Architecture Historic District	December 4, 1973 (#73000699)	Bounded roughly by Harlem Ave., Division, Clyde, and Lake Sts.; also roughly bounded by Division St. on the north, Cuyler Ave. on the east, Lake St. on the south, and Harlem Ave. on the west 41°53′37″N 87°47′32″W	Oak Park	Second set of boundaries represents a boundary increase of May 22, 2009
141	Joshua P. Young House	Joshua P. Young House	August 12, 1982 (#82002525)	2445 High St. 41°39′09″N 87°40′30″W	Blue Island	built c. 1854, home of influential mid-nineteenth century developer of Chicago's south side and southern suburbs.

== Former listings ==
	Name on the Register	Image	Date listed	Date removed	Location	City or town	Description
1	Hyatt House Hotel	Hyatt House Hotel	July 31, 2013 (#13000553)	January 2, 2020	4500 West Touhy Avenue; 42°00′44″N 87°44′30″W	Lincolnwood	Demolished on August 27, 2013.
2	Oak Lawn (Cook) School	Oak Lawn (Cook) School	November 2, 1990 (#90001725)	January 6, 2020	9526 S. Cook Ave. 41°43′08″N 87°45′07″W	Oak Lawn	Demolished in 2003
3	Washington School		August 15, 1997 (#97000864)	March 14, 2002	7970 Washington Boulevard	River Forest	Demolished in September 1998

== Key ==
	NRHP-listed
^{∞}	NRHP-listed Historic district
*	National Historic Landmark and NRHP-listed
^{∞}	National Historic Landmark and NRHP-listed Historic district

== See also ==
- List of Chicago Landmarks
- National Register of Historic Places listings in Chicago
- National Register of Historic Places listings in Illinois
- List of National Historic Landmarks in Illinois
