= Soffel =

Soffel is a surname. Notable people with the surname include:

- Doris Soffel, German mezzo-soprano
- Kate Soffel (1867–1909), wife of the warden of the Allegheny County Jail in Pittsburgh, Pennsylvania, U.S.
- Sara Soffel (1886–1976), American lawyer and judge

== See also ==
- Albert Soffel House, historic house in Maywood, Illinois, U.S.
- Mrs. Soffel, 1984 American drama film
