= Dilg (surname) =

Dilg is a surname. Notable people with the surname include:

- John Dilg (born 1945), American painter

== See also ==
- Herbert A. Dilg House
