= The Wayside (Henry Demarest Lloyd House) =

Historic house in Illinois, United States

- U.S. National Register of Historic Places
- U.S. National Historic Landmark
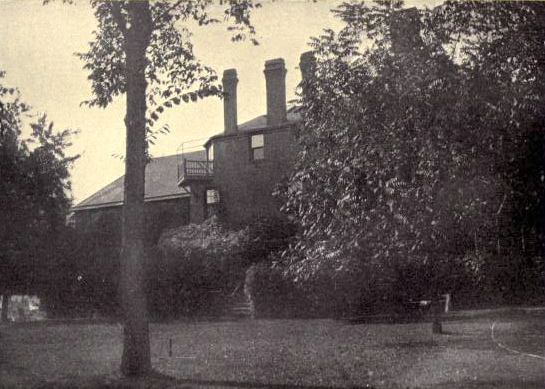
- The Wayside c. 1912

- Location within Illinois Location within the United States
- Location: 830 Sheridan Road, Winnetka, Illinois
- Coordinates: 42°6′50.97″N 87°43′56.03″W
- Area: less than one acre
- Built: mid-19th century
- NRHP reference No.: 66000320

Significant dates
- Added to NRHP: November 13, 1966
- Designated NHL: November 13, 1966

The Wayside, also known as the Henry Demarest Lloyd House, is a historic house at 830 Sheridan Road in Winnetka, Illinois, United States. An extensively altered mid-19th century country inn, it was from 1880 until his death in 1903 the principal residence of Henry Demarest Lloyd (1847–1903). Lloyd was a leading "muckraking" journalist of the late 19th century, and a major editorial voice against corporate monopolies and for organized labor. His house was declared a National Historic Landmark in 1966.

== Description and history ==
The Wayside is located on the west side of Sheridan Road, at its junction with Lloyd Place in central eastern Winnetka. It is located across the street from Lloyd Beach, a public park that was previously part of the Lloyd estate. Now set in a small lot, the Lloyd house is a 2 1/2-story brick building, with a dormered hip roof. A single-story porch extends across the front and wraps part way down both sides. At the center of the east-facing front facade, a porte-cochere shelters the main stairs accessing the porch. A wood-frame two-story addition extends to the rear of the house. The house interior is largely reflective of the turn of the 20th century, and includes the writing study of Henry Dumarest Lloyd on the third floor in largely unaltered condition.

Henry Demarest Lloyd was a native of New York City, and received a law degree from Columbia University. From an early date he was politically active, and became the editor of an anti-tariff advocacy group in the early 1870s. In 1872 he took a position at the Chicago Tribune, where he became a prominent writer critical of industrial and commercial business practices. He was an outspoken opponent of monopolies, and became an increasingly strident voice in support of organized labor.

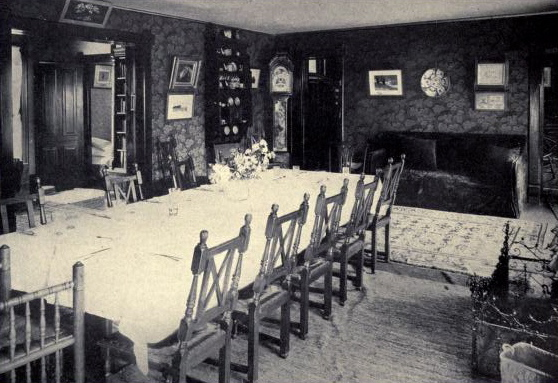
Dining room at The Wayside

In the mid-1880s Lloyd's health suffered a decline, and the family purchased The Wayside, then a derelict country inn, in 1878. After restoration and alterations, it became the family's principal home until Lloyd's death in 1903. The Lloyds hosted many prominent individuals of the time here, including Booker T. Washington, Charlotte Perkins Gilman, and Walter Crane.

== See also ==
- List of National Historic Landmarks in Illinois
- National Register of Historic Places listings in Cook County, Illinois
