= Charles H. Patten House =

United States historic home

- U.S. National Register of Historic Places
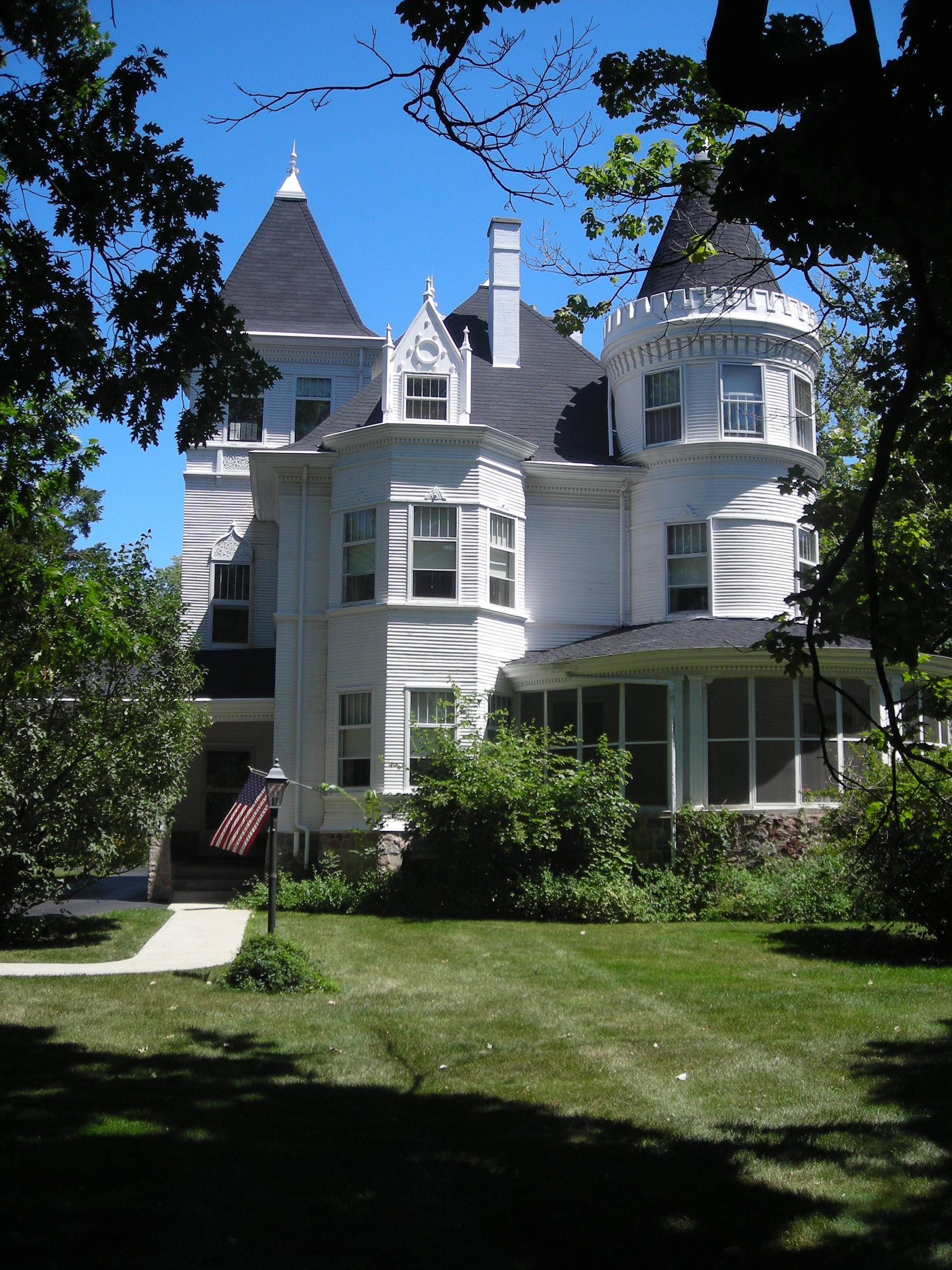
- Location: Palatine, Cook County, Illinois, United States
- Coordinates: 42°6′45.62″N 88°2′28.66″W
- Area: 2 acres (0.81 ha)
- Built: 1898
- Architect: Julius F. Wegman
- Architectural style: Queen Anne, Chateauesque
- NRHP reference No.: 06001018
- Added to NRHP: November 8, 2006

The Charles H. Patten House is a Chateauesque and Queen Anne style home located at 117 N. Benton Street in Palatine, Illinois. It was designed by Julius F. Wegman for Charles H. Patten, a prominent local businessman who was also mayor of Palatine from 1894 to 1895.

== History ==
Charles H. Patten was born in 1853 and grew up on a farm near Palatine. He was the son of John Patten, who moved to the area from Londonderry, New Hampshire. Charles opened the Bank of Palatine, which was the only bank in the village at the time. He later became director of the First National Bank of Palatine. He married Mary Robertson of Lake Zurich and opened a creamery in her hometown. Patten served as village treasurer and was elected Mayor of Palatine in 1894, a position that he held through 1895. His main platform in the election was the need for a water system, and ordered the construction of the Palatine and Barrington Water Works. Patten was a member of the Ancient Arabic Order of the Nobles of the Mystic Shrine and was an early investor in the Palatine, Lake Zurich and Wauconda Railroad. Patten died of a heart attack while working on his home in 1929.

Charles Patten constructed his home in 1898 on Benton Street. He hired Chicago architect Julius F. Wegman to design the building. The stained glass window in the front of the house was previously installed in John Patten's house. Charles Patten was adamant about using local labor to construct the home and used wood from local groves. A carriage barn and windmill were also constructed on the site, although these structures no longer stand. The house passed to Charles Patten's daughter Mary upon his death. She sold the house to her nephew and his wife, who occupied the residence until 2004. It was added to the National Register of Historic Places on November 8, 2006.

== Architecture ==
The roof is the most noticeable area of Chateauesque architecture, featuring finials and tall chimneys. The Queen Anne turret features corbels below the roofline. The elaborate patterns on the exterior walls are also express Queen Anne influence. The Patten House is the sole building remaining in Palatine from the period that has Chateauesque elements—most surviving structures, such as the George Clayson House, are in the Second Empire style. Only three other houses in Palatine are in the Queen Anne style.
