= Gunderson Historic District =

Historic district in Illinois, United States

- U.S. National Register of Historic Places
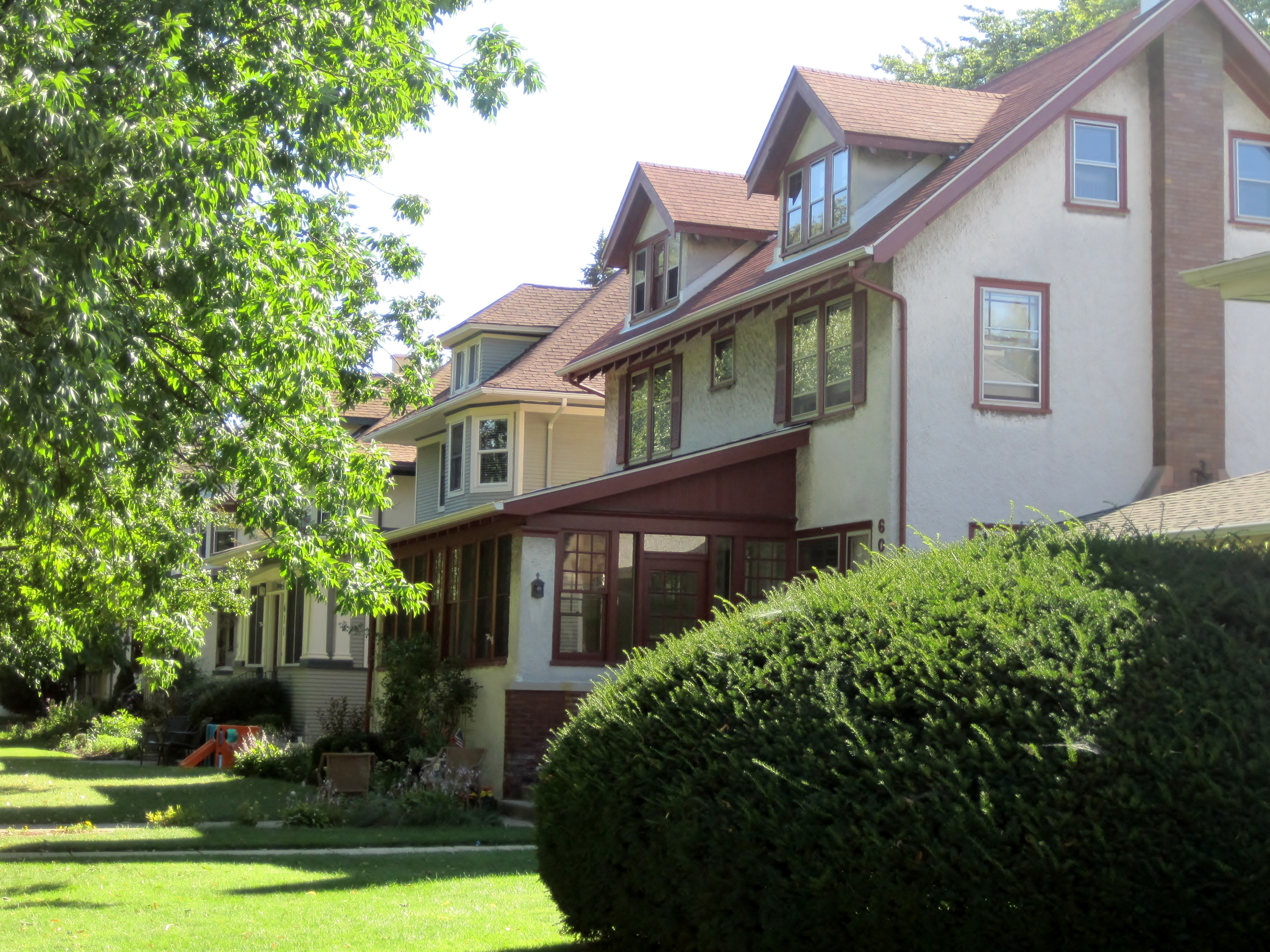

- Location within Chicago metropolitan area Location within Illinois Location within the United States
- Location: Roughly bounded by Madison St., Harrison St., Gunderson St., and S. Ridgeland Ave., Oak Park, Illinois
- Coordinates: 41°52′34″N 87°47′08″W
- Area: 42 acres (17 ha)
- Built by: S.T. Gunderson and Sons
- Architect: Frank DeMoney
- Architectural style: American Foursquare
- NRHP reference No.: 02000100
- Added to NRHP: March 1, 2002

The Gunderson Historic District is a residential historic district in southern Oak Park, Illinois. The district encompasses 230 residential buildings built between 1906 and 1920, the vast majority of which are single-family homes. The development was the second of two built in Oak Park by S.T. Gunderson and Sons, a housing company which mainly worked in Oak Park and the West Side of Chicago. The firm commissioned architect Frank DeMoney to design their Oak Park houses; most of his designs used the American Foursquare style, a simple style which could be executed affordably. DeMoney differentiated the houses by applying elements of other contemporary architectural styles, such as Arts and Crafts, Colonial Revival, or Prairie School. The uniform design and layout of its homes made the district an early example of tract housing, which would become much more widespread later in the twentieth century.

The district was added to the National Register of Historic Places on March 1, 2002.

== See also ==
- National Register of Historic Places listings in Cook County, Illinois
