= Flat Iron Building (Chicago Heights, Illinois) =

- U.S. National Register of Historic Places
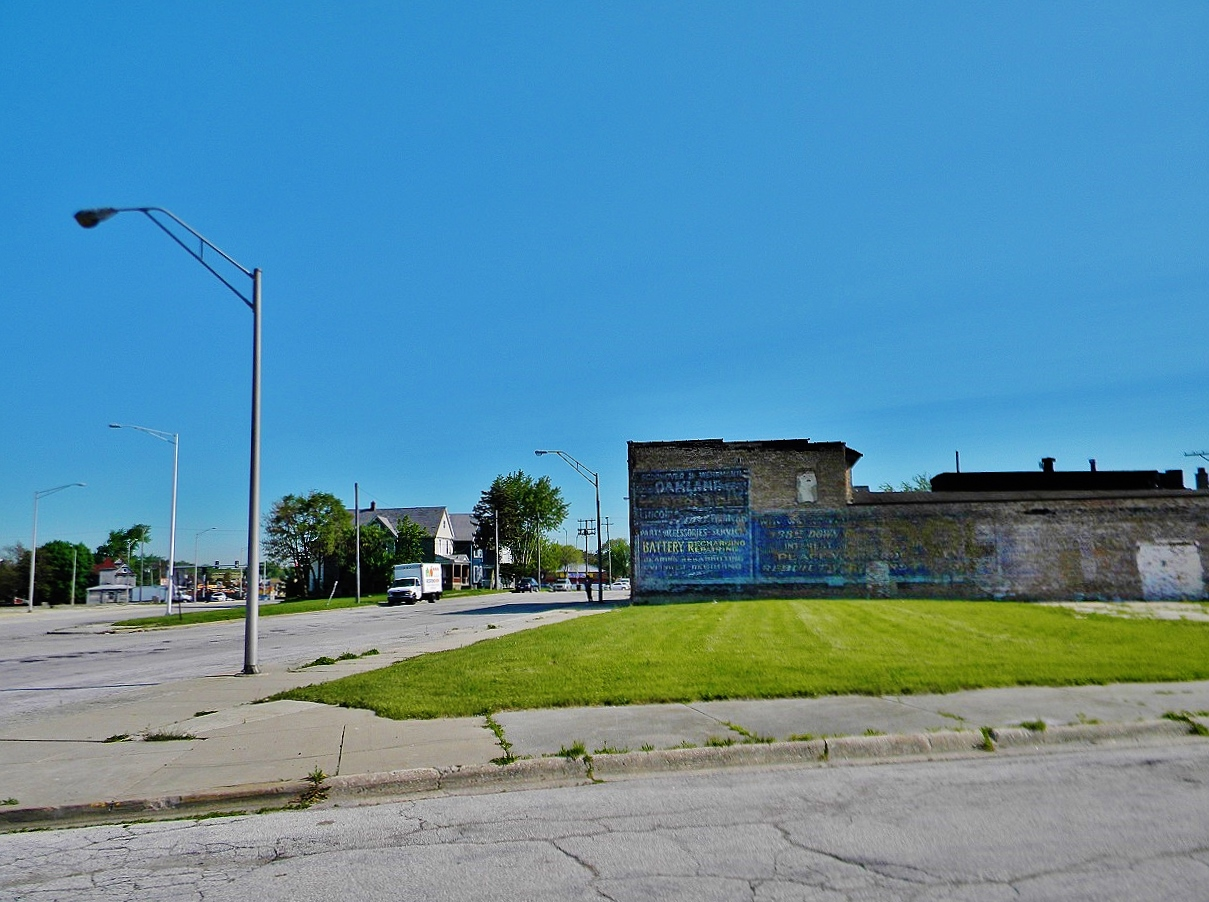
- Site of the building

- Location within Illinois Location within the United States
- Location: 1441-1449 Emerald Ave., Chicago Heights, Illinois
- Coordinates: 41°30′16″N 87°38′5″W
- Area: 0.9 acres (0.36 ha)
- Built: 1925
- Architectural style: Mission/Spanish Revival, Spanish Baroque
- NRHP reference No.: 03000917
- Added to NRHP: September 13, 2003

The Flat Iron Building in Chicago Heights, Illinois, was listed on the National Register of Historic Places in 2003. It was torn down in 2009.
