= Maywood Fire Department Building =

- U.S. National Register of Historic Places
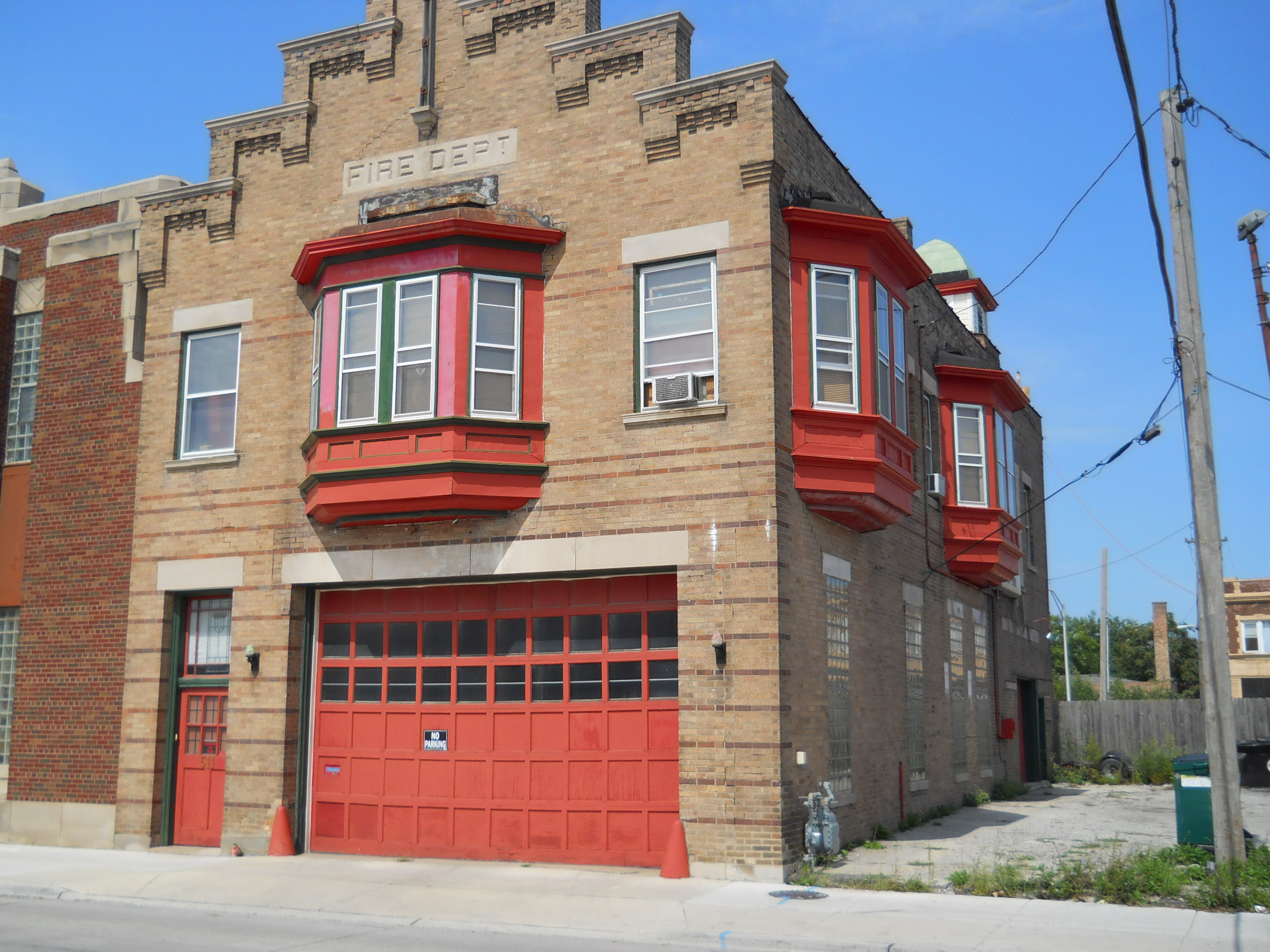

- Location within Illinois
- Location: 511 St. Charles Rd., Maywood, Illinois
- Coordinates: 41°53′17″N 87°50′24″W
- Area: less than one acre
- Built: 1904
- Architectural style: Late 19th and Early 20th Century American Movements, Dutch Revival
- MPS: Maywood MPS
- NRHP reference No.: 92000492
- Added to NRHP: May 22, 1992

The Maywood Fire Department Building, at 511 St. Charles Rd. in Maywood, Illinois, was built in 1904. It was listed on the National Register of Historic Places in 1992.

It has Dutch Revival architecture, including a stepped gable. It was the Village of Maywood's first public fire station and was used until the early 1980s. Later used as a residence, it retains its original fire pole inside.
