= Jesse L. Strauss Estate =

Historic house in Illinois, United States

- U.S. National Register of Historic Places
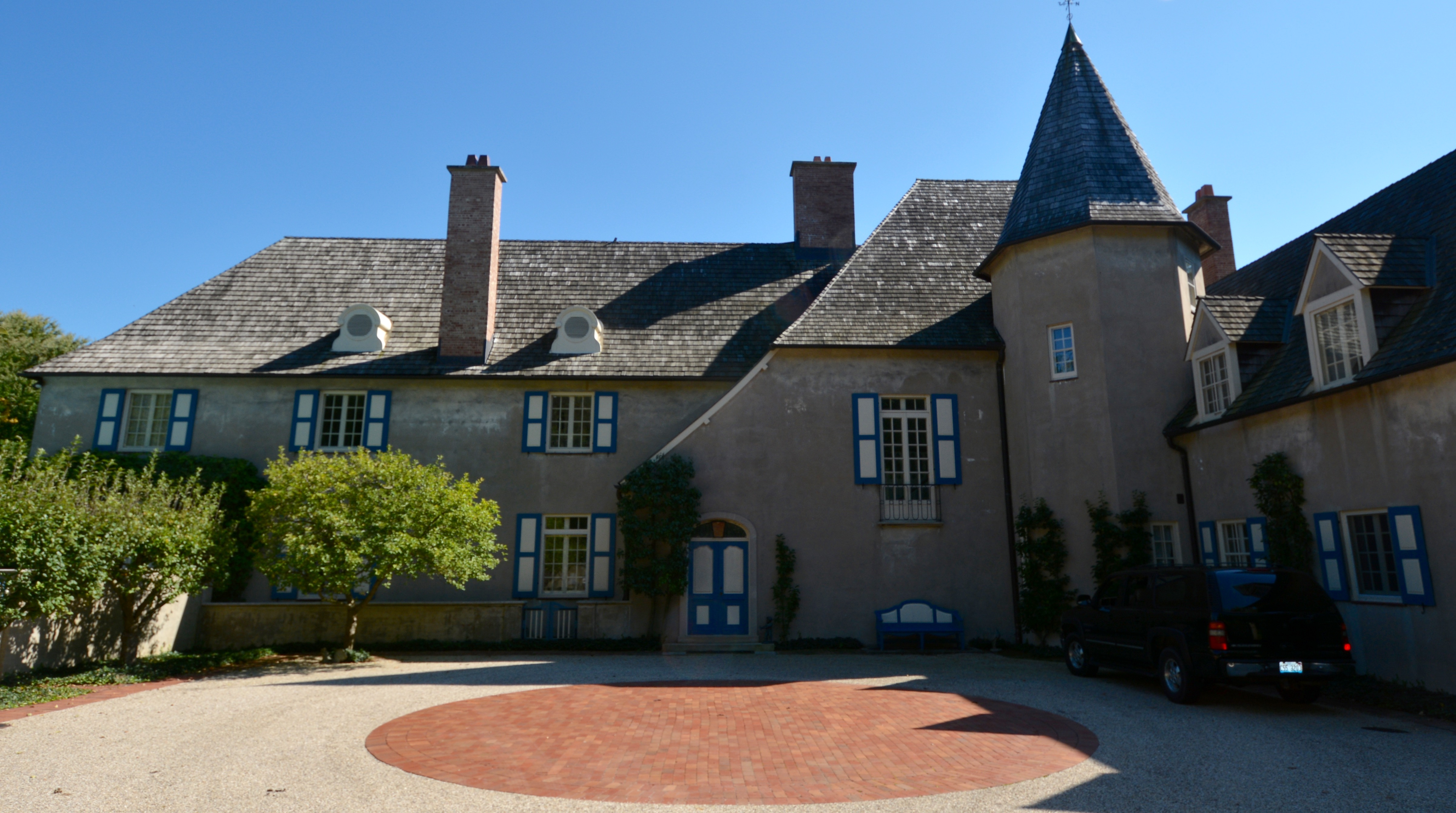

- Location within Chicago metropolitan area Location within Illinois Location within the United States
- Location: 110 Maple Hill Rd., Glencoe, Illinois
- Coordinates: 42°08′33″N 87°45′19″W
- Built: 1921
- Architect: David Adler
- Architectural style: French Revival
- NRHP reference No.: 14001065
- Added to NRHP: December 22, 2014

The Jesse L. Strauss Estate is a historic house at 110 Maple Hill Road in Glencoe, Illinois. The house was built in 1921 for businessman Jesse Strauss and his wife Blanche. David Adler, a prominent Chicago architect known for building large country houses for wealthy clients, designed the house. Like many of his works, Adler's design for the Strauss Estate was inspired by French architecture, and the estate was meant to resemble a French farmhouse. The house consists of a main wing and a service wing which form an "L" shape, with an octagonal tower at the corner between them. Its design also includes a projection at the main entrance, a stucco exterior with wood trim, and a steep roof punctuated by dormers.

The house was added to the National Register of Historic Places on December 22, 2014.
