= William McJunkin House =

Historic house in Illinois, United States

- U.S. National Register of Historic Places
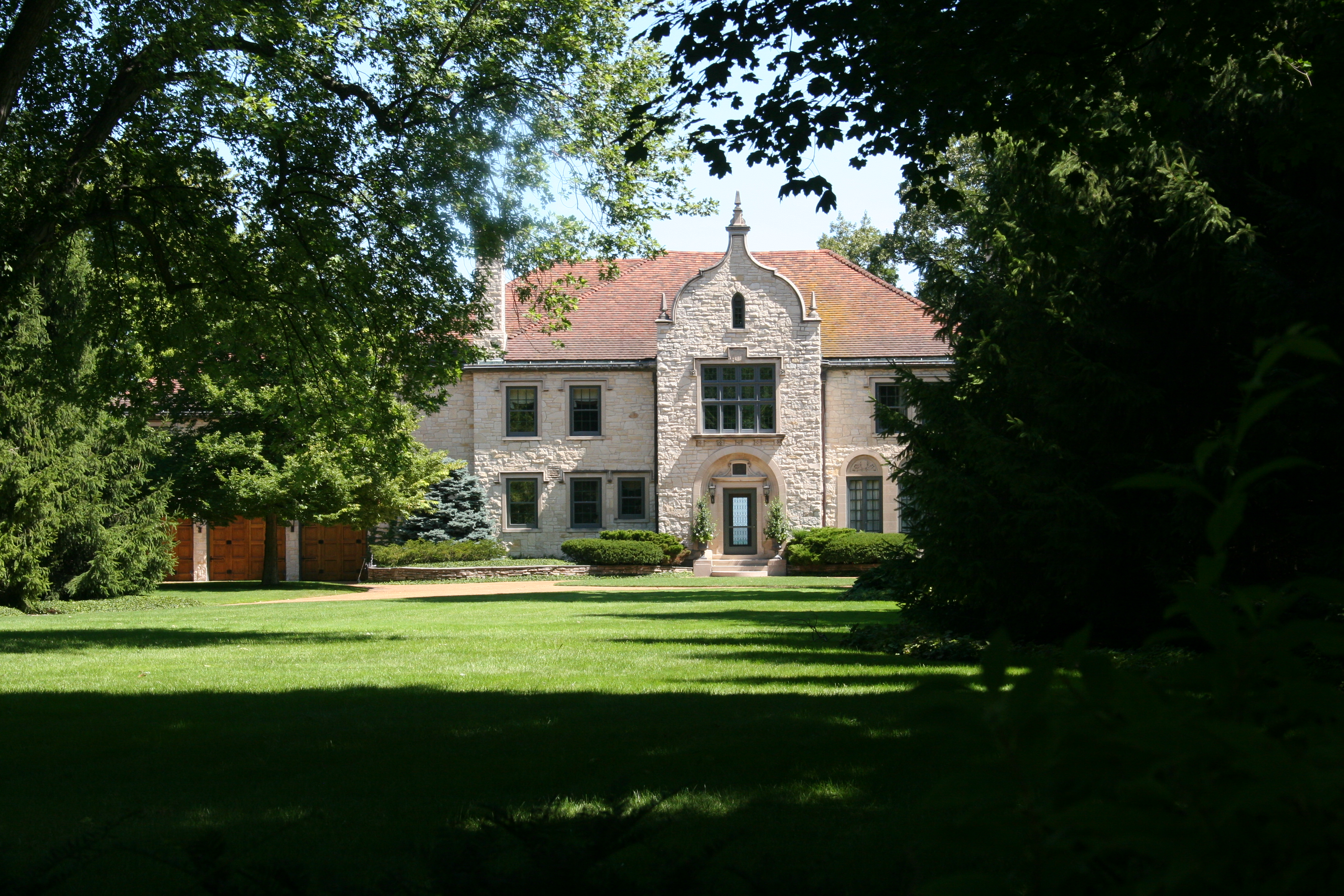

- Location within Chicago metropolitan area Location within Illinois Location within the United States
- Location: 151 Sheridan Rd., Winnetka, Illinois
- Coordinates: 42°05′44″N 87°42′43″W
- Area: 1.5 acres (0.61 ha)
- Built: 1928-29
- Architect: Charles Whitney Stevens
- Architectural style: Jacobethan, Tudor Revival
- NRHP reference No.: 06000104
- Added to NRHP: March 2, 2006

The William McJunkin House is a historic house at 151 Sheridan Road in Winnetka, Illinois. The house was built in 1928-29 for William McJunkin, founder and president of the McJunkin Advertising Company. The house's lot was in a desirable location along the shore of Lake Michigan; both the lakeshore and Sheridan Road, which ran alongside it, played an important role in Winnetka's early development and planning. Architect Charles Whitley Stevens designed the building in the Jacobethan style, a less common variation of the popular Tudor Revival style. The house has a limestone exterior and features a large Flemish gable atop a projecting entrance block, a pediment above the doorway, arches surrounding the main entrance and living room windows, and a clay tile roof. Coat of arms over entryway is inscribed “Ne Obliviscaris” meaning “Never Forget”, as are other crests deriving from Scotland's Campbell Clan. The Jacobethan design continues inside the house with intricate plaster reliefs and decorative wallpaper.

The house was added to the National Register of Historic Places on March 2, 2006.
