= George W. Maher House =

Historic house in Illinois, United States

- U.S. National Register of Historic Places
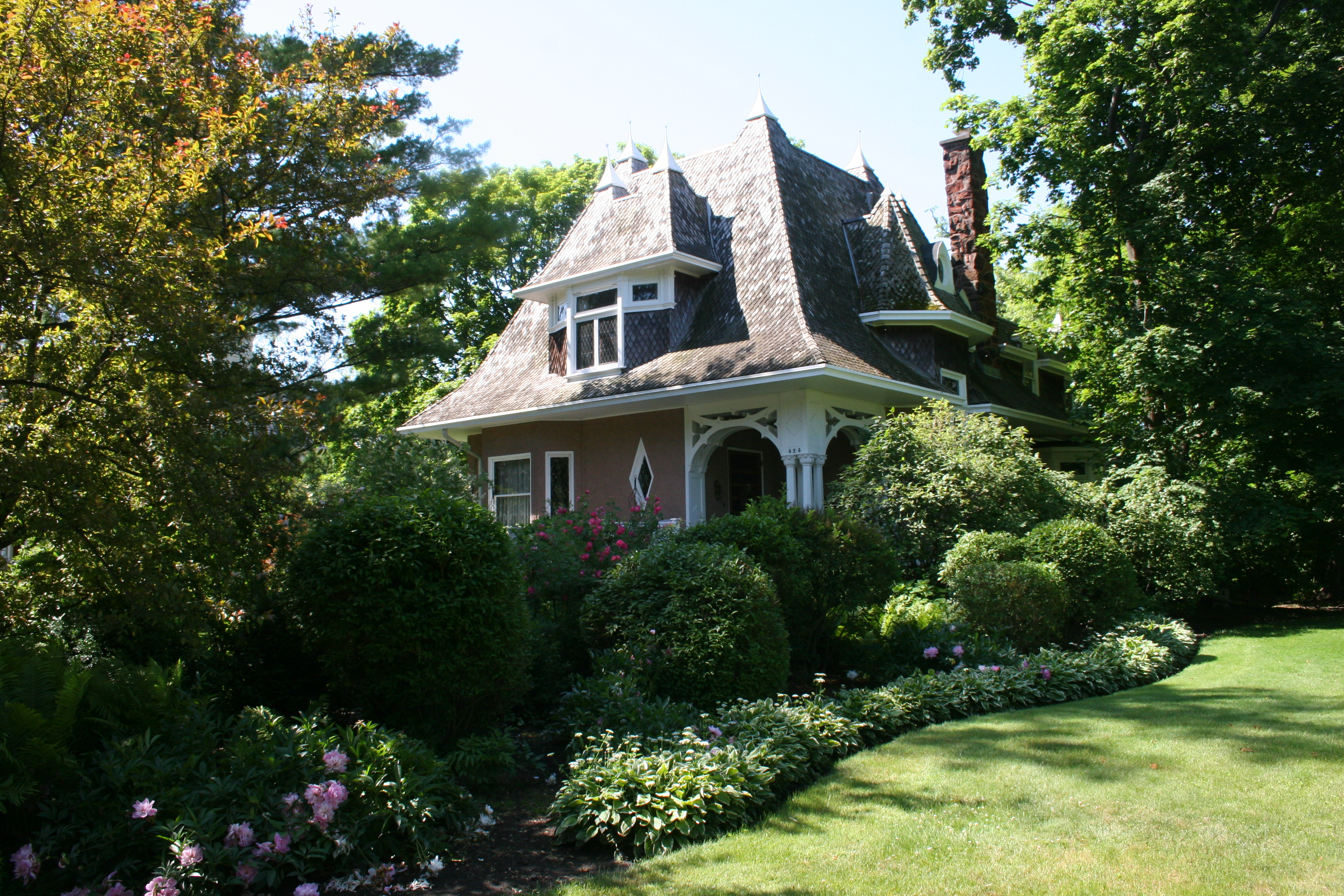

- Location within Chicago metropolitan area Location within Illinois Location within the United States
- Location: 424 Warwick Rd., Kenilworth, Illinois
- Coordinates: 42°05′24″N 87°42′47″W
- Area: less than one acre
- Built: 1893
- Architect: George W. Maher
- Architectural style: Arts and Crafts, Prairie School
- NRHP reference No.: 79000833
- Added to NRHP: March 21, 1979

The George W. Maher House is a historic house at 424 Warwick Road in Kenilworth, Illinois, USA. The architect George W. Maher built the house in 1893 for himself and his wife. His design was influenced by the Arts and Crafts movement and is an early example of a house with Prairie School elements. The house has a massive rectangular form and features a porch with decorative woodwork, several projecting bays, and a variety of window shapes. Its large hip roof with multiple dormers and pinnacles is characteristic of Maher's earliest designs.

The house was added to the National Register of Historic Places on March 21, 1979.
