= Caroline Grow House =

Historic house in Illinois, United States

- U.S. National Register of Historic Places
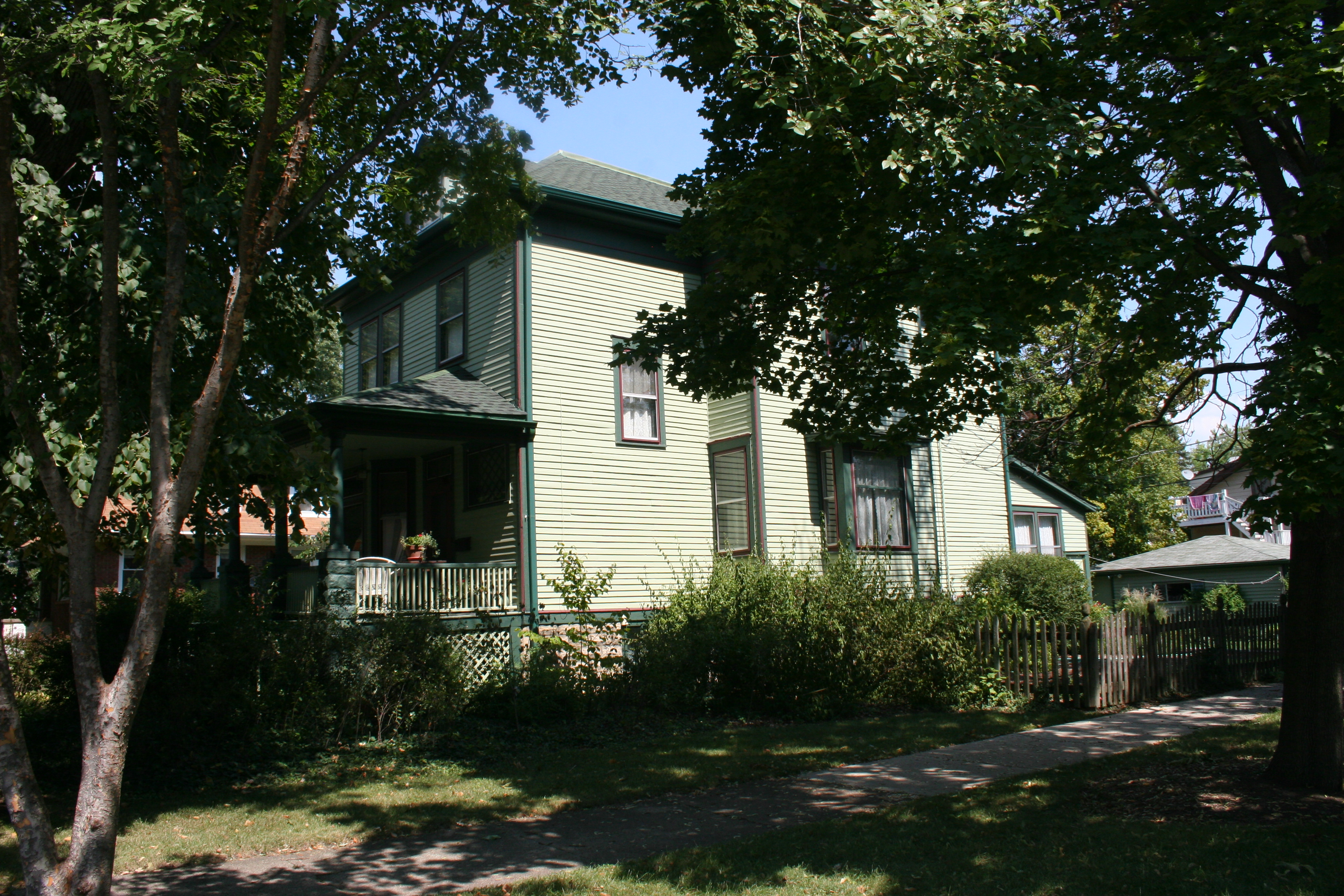

- Location within Chicago metropolitan area Location within Illinois Location within the United States
- Location: 603 N. 6th Ave., Maywood, Illinois
- Coordinates: 41°53′34″N 87°50′25″W
- Area: less than one acre
- Built: c. 1902
- Architectural style: American Foursquare
- MPS: Maywood MPS
- NRHP reference No.: 92000489
- Added to NRHP: May 22, 1992

The Caroline Grow House is a historic house at 603 N. 6th Avenue in Maywood, Illinois. The house was built circa 1902 by Caroline Grow, whose late husband David bought the house's plot in 1875. It has an American Foursquare design, a utilitarian style which was popular in the early twentieth century. The 2 1/2-story house has a rectangular form with a front porch supported by four columns and a hip roof with a central dormer, a typical layout for a Foursquare home. The design also includes Neoclassical details such as the Doric capitals on the porch's columns; these were common in Chicago-area architecture after the 1893 Columbian Exposition popularized the style.

The house was added to the National Register of Historic Places on May 22, 1992.
