= Ouilmette North Historic District =

Historic district in Illinois, United States

- U.S. National Register of Historic Places
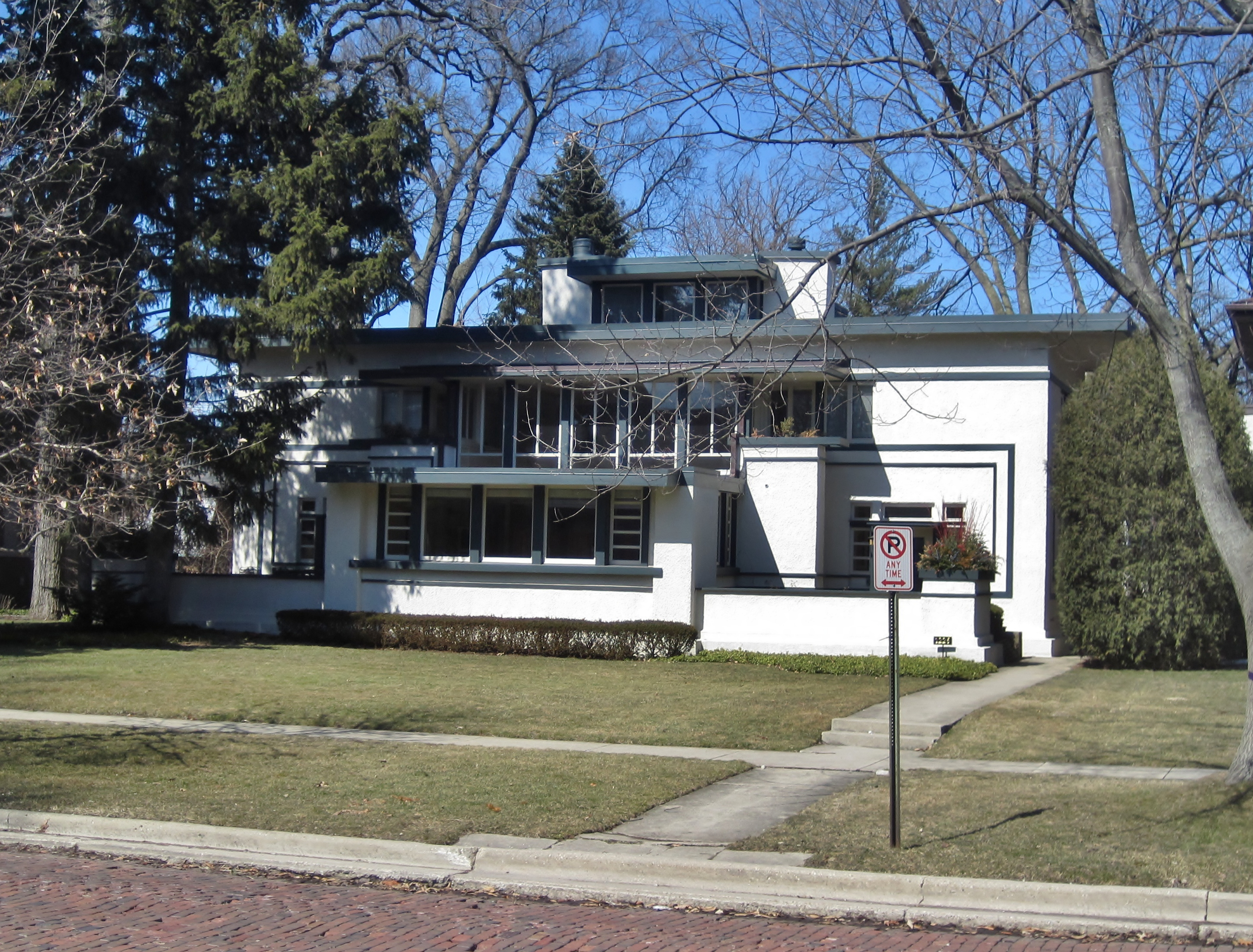
- Ralph S. Baker House

- Location within Chicago metropolitan area Location within Illinois Location within the United States
- Location: 46 blocks: Chesnut Ave, Sheridan Road, Lake Ave. and 13th St., Wilmette, Illinois
- Coordinates: 42°04′55″N 87°42′03″W
- Area: 269 acres (109 ha)
- NRHP reference No.: 05001370
- Added to NRHP: December 6, 2005

The Ouilmette North Historic District is a residential historic district in northeastern Wilmette, Illinois. The district includes 911 contributing buildings; all are houses except for two churches, Trinity United Methodist Church and the Community Church of Wilmette. The southern half of the district was originally part of the Ouilmette Reservation, an Indian reservation which was sold to developers and became the original village of Wilmette in 1872. Development in the district began after the village's incorporation and continued through World War II, with most new construction happening in the early twentieth century. The district includes examples of Queen Anne architecture from the late nineteenth century, Prairie School architecture from the first two decades of the twentieth century, and revival style architecture from the 1920s. Its Prairie School architecture is especially notable as it contains works by William Eugene Drummond and John S. Van Bergen, two early Prairie School architects who practiced with Frank Lloyd Wright.

The district was added to the National Register of Historic Places on December 6, 2005.
