= Joseph P. O. Sullivan House =

Historic house in Illinois, United States

- U.S. National Register of Historic Places
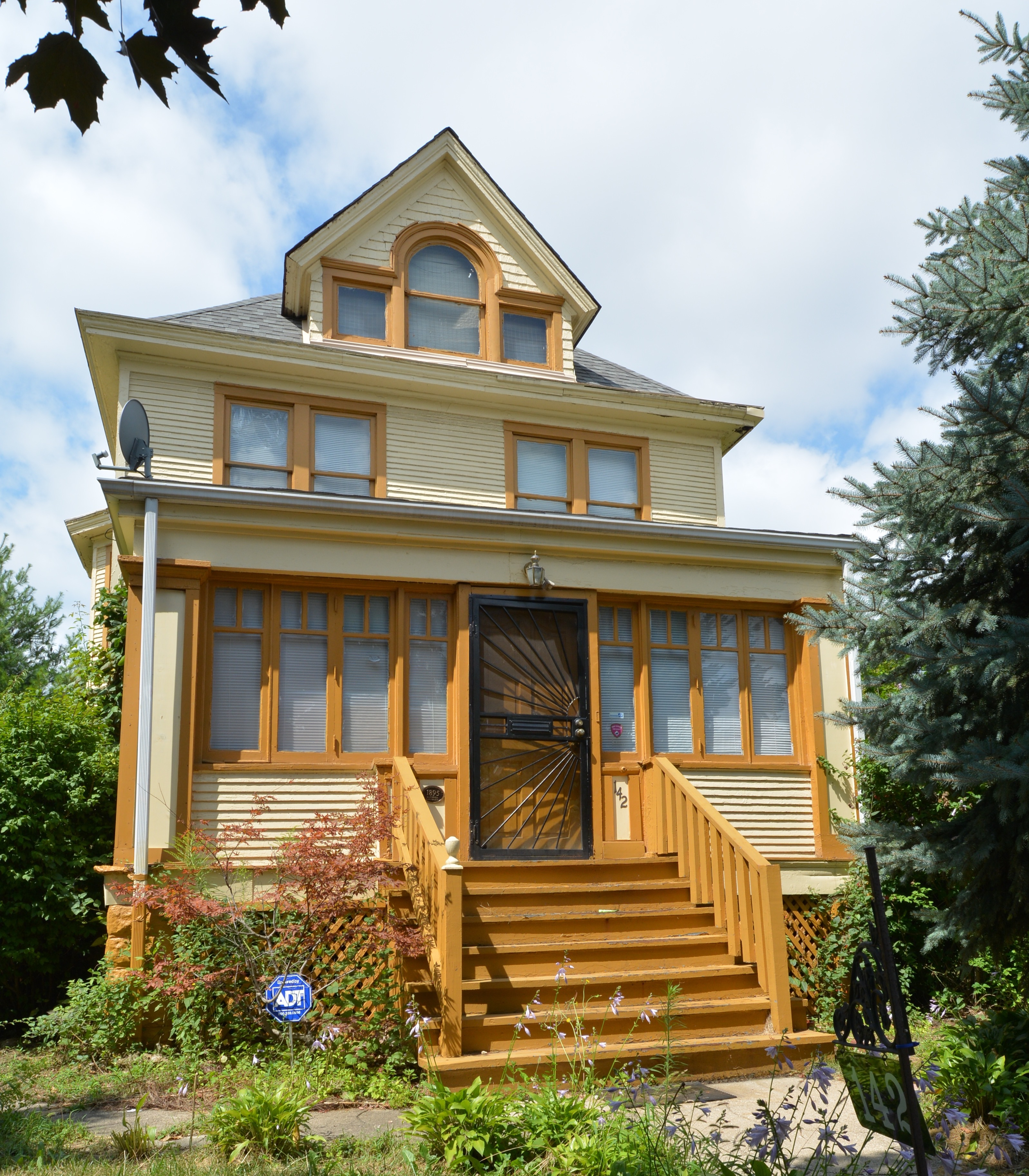

- Location within Chicago metropolitan area Location within Illinois Location within the United States
- Location: 142 S. 17th Ave., Maywood, Illinois
- Coordinates: 41°53′10″N 87°51′15″W
- Area: less than one acre
- Built: c. 1895
- Built by: Proviso Land Association
- Architectural style: American Foursquare
- MPS: Maywood MPS
- NRHP reference No.: 92000495
- Added to NRHP: May 22, 1992

The Joseph P. O. Sullivan House is a historic house at 142 S. 17th Avenue in Maywood, Illinois. The house was built circa 1895 by the Proviso Land Association for Joseph P. O. Sullivan. The Proviso Land Association was the second land developer to invest in Maywood, after the Maywood Company; most homes built by the Association have been demolished, making the Sullivan House a rare example of their work. Like many of the Association's homes, the Sullivan House has an American Foursquare design. The house has a rectangular two-story layout with a front porch, a projecting bay on one side, a hip roof, and a dormer with a classical Palladian window.

The house was added to the National Register of Historic Places on May 22, 1992.
