= William Frangenheim House =

Historic house in Illinois, United States

- U.S. National Register of Historic Places
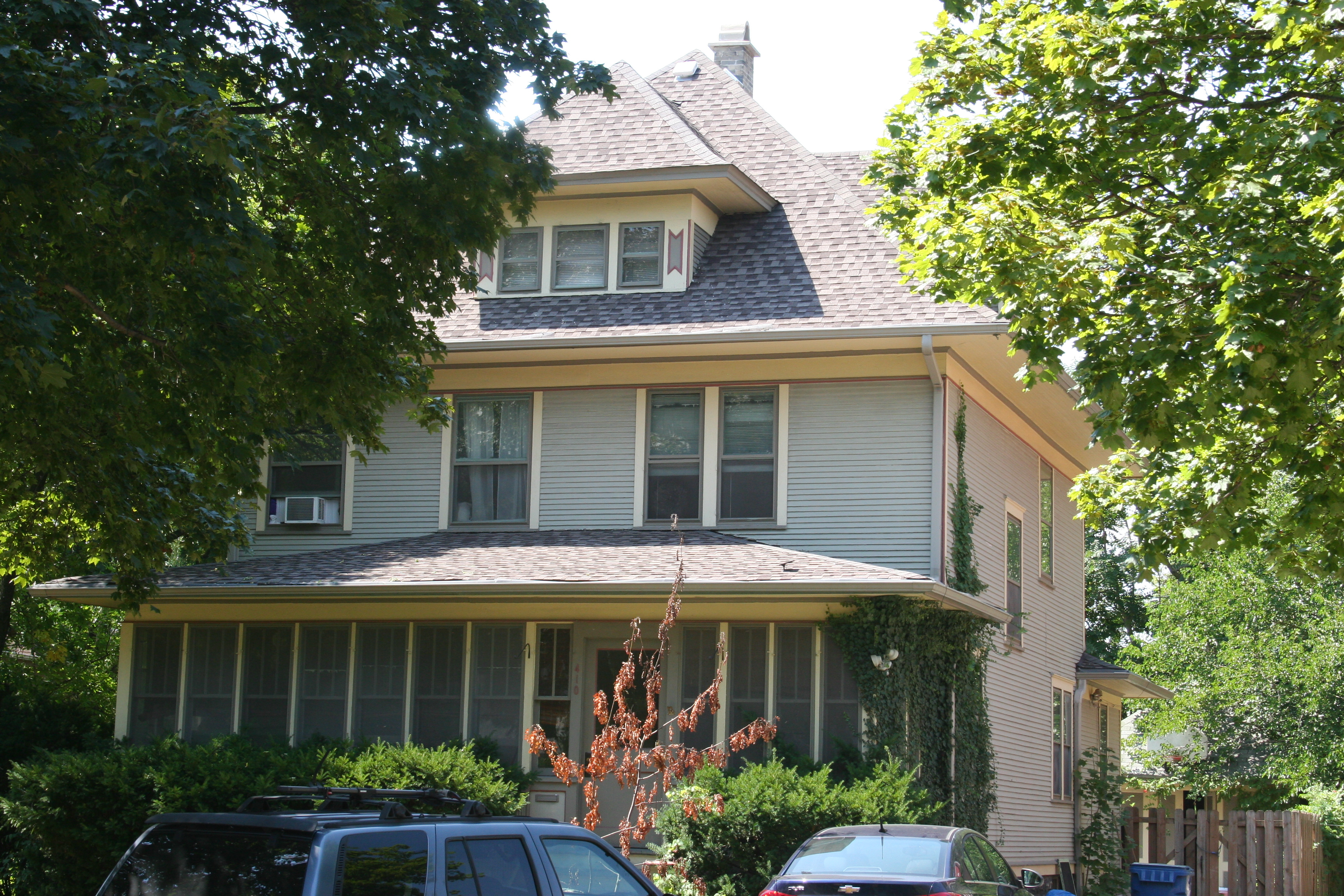

- Location within Chicago metropolitan area Location within Illinois Location within the United States
- Location: 410 N. 3rd Ave., Maywood, Illinois
- Coordinates: 41°53′29″N 87°50′14″W
- Area: less than one acre
- Built: 1906
- Architectural style: American Foursquare
- MPS: Maywood MPS
- NRHP reference No.: 92000488
- Added to NRHP: May 22, 1992

The William Frangenheim House is a historic house at 410 N. 3rd Avenue in Maywood, Illinois. The house was built in 1906 on a plot previously owned by the Maywood Company, the development company that planned Maywood. It is designed in the American Foursquare style, a vernacular style which was used in many Maywood houses of the period. Like most Foursquare homes, the house has a square two-story layout with a front porch and a hip roof with a dormer. In keeping with its utilitarian style, the house has little external decoration; its interior features Craftsman-inspired wood trim, though it is still relatively plain.

The house was added to the National Register of Historic Places on May 22, 1992.
