= Louis B. Kuppenheimer Jr. House =

Historic house in Illinois, United States

- U.S. National Register of Historic Places
- Location within Chicago metropolitan area Location within Illinois Location within the United States
- Location: 789 Burr Ave., Winnetka, Illinois
- Coordinates: 42°06′46″N 87°44′42″W
- Built: 1937-38
- Architect: David Adler
- Architectural style: French Renaissance
- NRHP reference No.: 98000980
- Added to NRHP: December 4, 2017

The Louis B. Kuppenheimer Jr. House is a historic house at 789 Burr Avenue in Winnetka, Illinois. The house was built in 1937-38 for Louis B. Kuppenheimer Jr. and his family; Kuppenheimer had inherited a large manor house from his father, who had been the president of a clothing company, but wished to move to a smaller home. Architect David Adler, a prominent architect best known for designing country houses, designed the house in the French Renaissance Revival style. The house's design includes a recessed arched entrance, French doors along the south and west sides, a service wing with a mansard roof, a porch wing, and a dentillated cornice. While the house is smaller than most of Adler's works, it still exhibits the typical themes of his designs, such as eclecticism, symmetry, and attention to detail.

The house was added to the National Register of Historic Places on December 4, 2017.
