= Mahoney Park =

- Wild Flower and Bird Sanctuary in Mahoney Park
- U.S. National Register of Historic Places
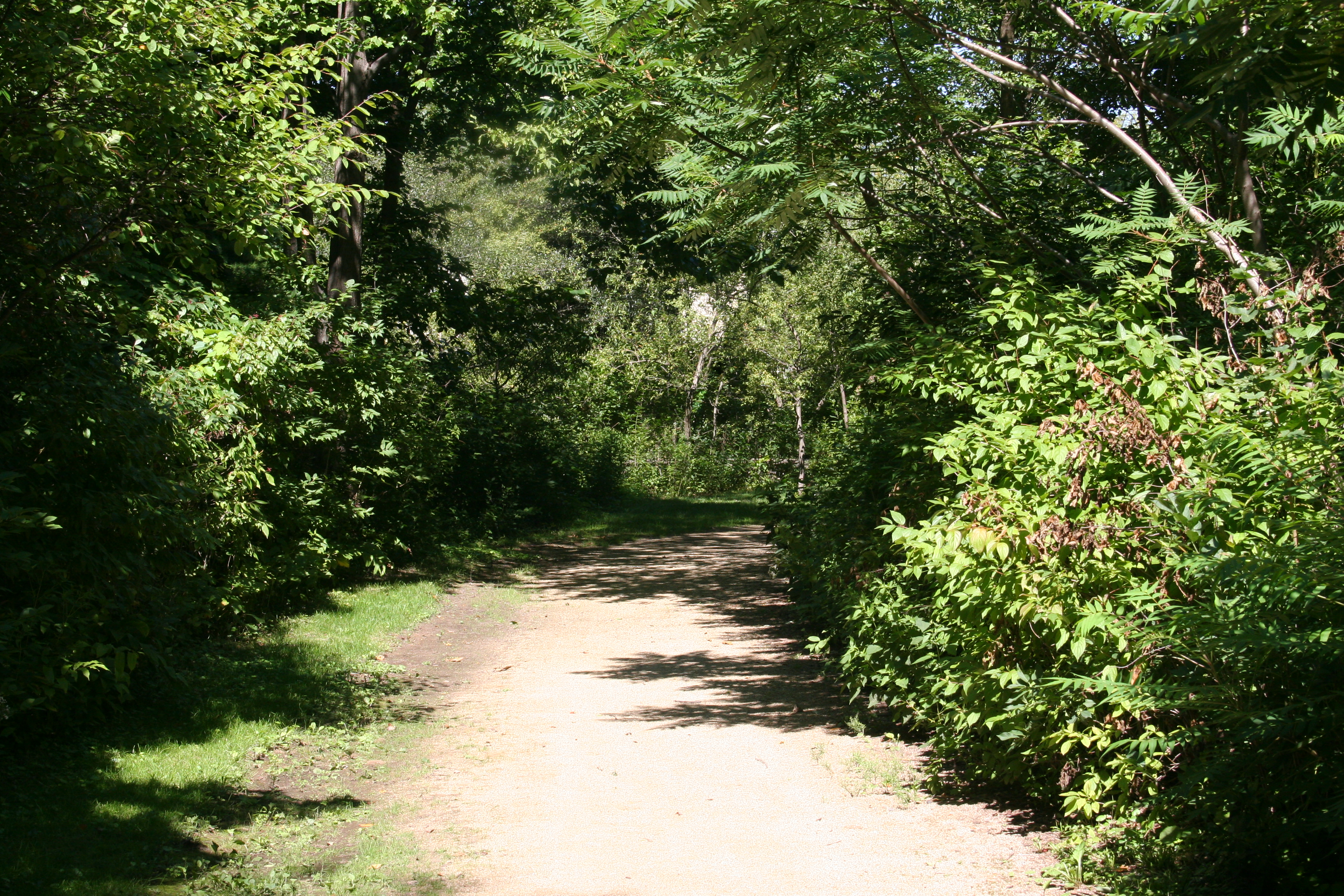

- Location within Chicago metropolitan area Location within Illinois Location within the United States
- Location: Sheridan Rd., Kenilworth, Illinois
- Coordinates: 42°05′21″N 87°42′12″W
- Area: 3.1 acres (1.3 ha)
- Built: 1933
- Architect: Jens Jensen
- NRHP reference No.: 85000772
- Added to NRHP: April 10, 1985

Mahoney Park is a public park on Sheridan Road in the southeast corner of Kenilworth, Illinois. The park opened in 1933 on land donated to the village by the Mahoney family, who required that the land become a park as a condition of their donation. Landscape architect Jens Jensen designed the park; while Jensen designed many private estates in the 1920s, his 1930s work was less prolific and focused on projects with personal significance to him. Jensen's design for the park was inspired by the Prairie School movement and includes curving paths, wildflowers, islands of shrubbery and trees, bird baths, and seven council rings. The park is the only remaining small park designed by Jensen and is a rare intact example of his work in north suburban Chicago, as many of his larger works were later subdivided.

The park was added to the National Register of Historic Places on April 10, 1985.
