= Robinson House (Maywood, Illinois) =

Historic house in Illinois, United States

- U.S. National Register of Historic Places
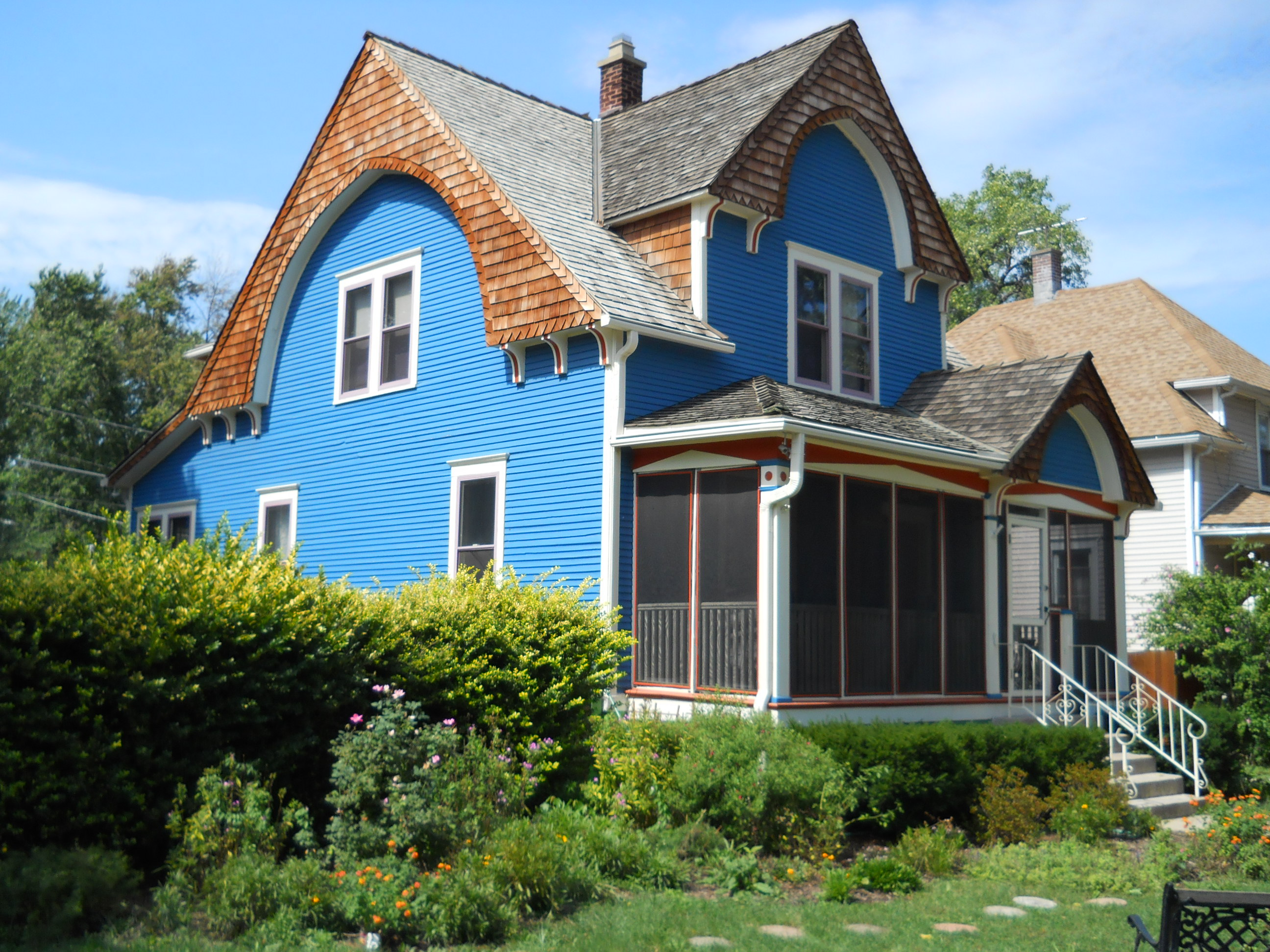

- Location within Illinois Location within the United States
- Location: 602 N. 3rd Ave., Maywood, Illinois
- Coordinates: 41°53′35″N 87°50′14″W
- Area: less than one acre
- Architectural style: Vernacular square cottage
- MPS: Maywood MPS
- NRHP reference No.: 92000046
- Added to NRHP: February 24, 1992

The Robinson House is a historic house located at 602 N. 3rd Ave. in Maywood, Illinois, United States. The square-shaped house is designed in a vernacular cottage style and features a gable roof, wooden shingled Gothic arches on all sides, and a front porch with a hipped roof. While the house's date of construction is unknown, it is likely 1901, when owner James Munton took out a mortgage on the property. The house is named for longtime occupants the Robinson family, who bought the house in 1908 and remained there until shortly before 1992.

The Robinson House was added to the National Register of Historic Places on February 24, 1992.
