= Jennie S. Thompkins House =

Historic house in Illinois, United States

- U.S. National Register of Historic Places
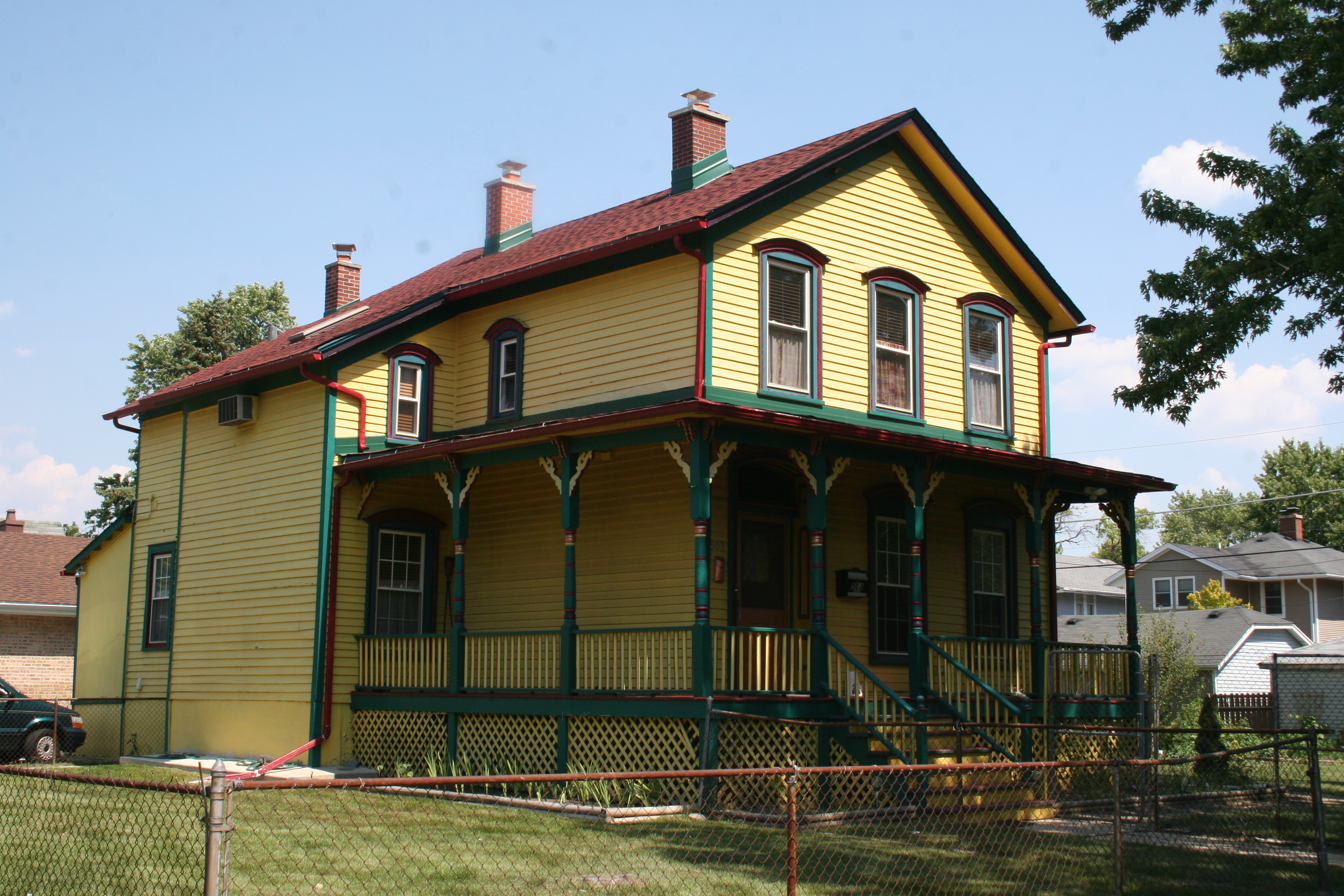

- Location within Chicago metropolitan area Location within Illinois Location within the United States
- Location: 503 N. 4th Ave., Maywood, Illinois
- Coordinates: 41°53′28″N 87°50′23″W
- Area: less than one acre
- Architectural style: Gable front
- MPS: Maywood MPS
- NRHP reference No.: 92000496
- Added to NRHP: May 22, 1992

The Jennie S. Thompkins House is a historic house at 503 N. 4th Avenue in Maywood, Illinois. The house was built circa 1872 for Jennie S. Thompkins and her husband; they purchased its plot from the Maywood Company, the original developers of Maywood. It has a gable front design, a vernacular style commonly found in working-class Chicago homes of the period. While the gable front style was also common in Maywood, the house is an especially well-preserved example of the style, as most others have since been modified or sided. The design includes a three-bay facade with segmental arched windows and a wraparound front porch that features brackets, turned posts, and a balustrade.

The house was added to the National Register of Historic Places on May 22, 1992.
