= Lemont Downtown Historic District =

Historic district in Illinois, United States

- U.S. National Register of Historic Places
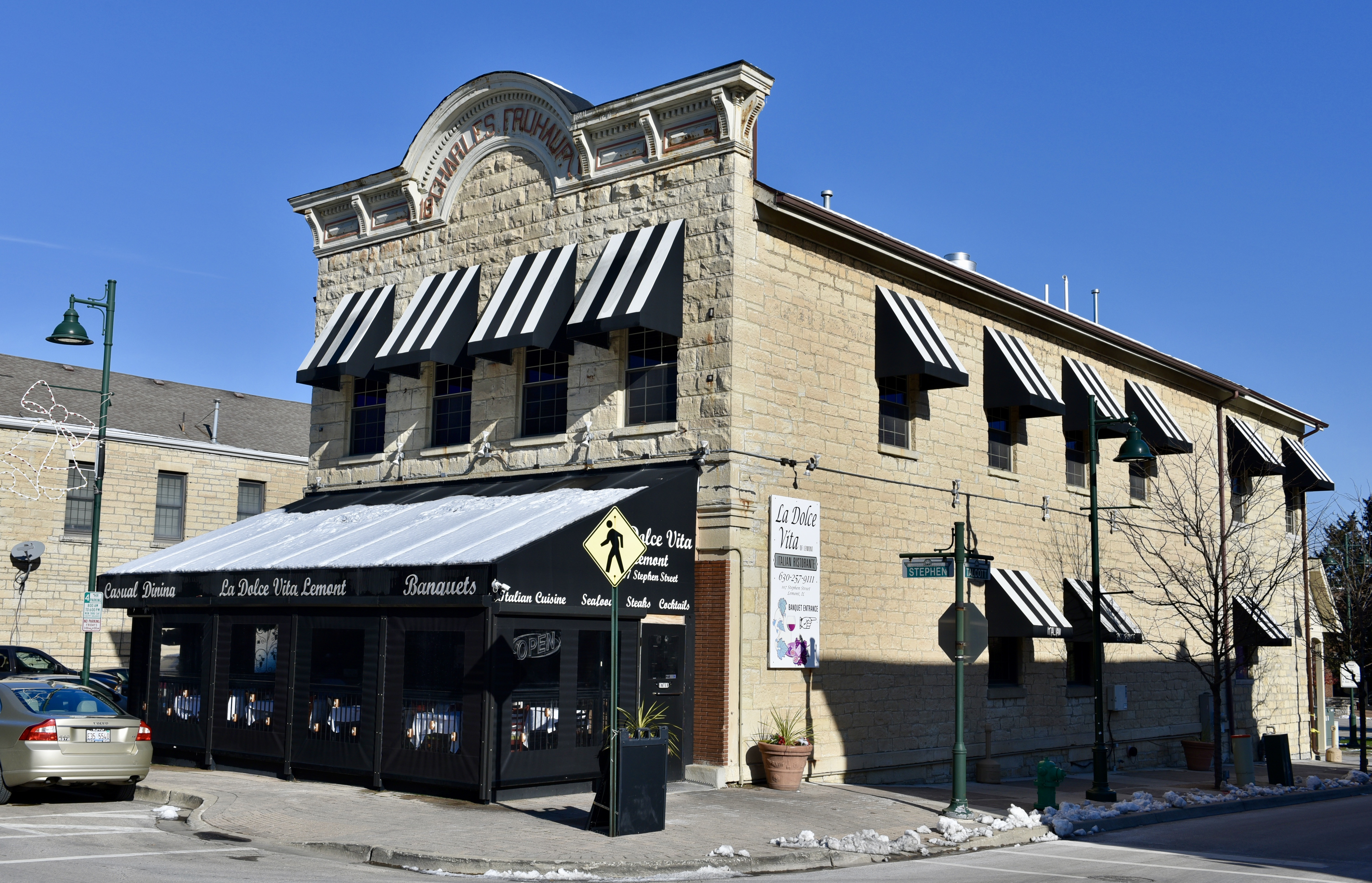
- Charles Fruhauf Building

- Location within Chicago metropolitan area Location within Illinois Location within the United States
- Location: Roughly bounded by Main, Stephen, Illinois, River and Front Sts., Lemont, Illinois
- Coordinates: 41°40′28″N 88°00′01″W
- Area: 16 acres (6.5 ha)
- NRHP reference No.: 16000582
- Added to NRHP: September 6, 2016

The Lemont Downtown Historic District is a commercial historic district encompassing 14 city blocks in downtown Lemont, Illinois. The district has served as the village's downtown since the 1850s when the newly opened Illinois & Michigan Canal and subsequent limestone quarrying in the area sparked a local economic boom. It expanded through the late nineteenth and early twentieth centuries as new railroads and the Chicago Sanitary and Ship Canal brought residents and business opportunities to the village. The commercial buildings in the district exhibit a variety of common building types seen between 1850 and 1950; one-part, two-part, gable-front, and false-front buildings are all present, and their designs feature Italianate, Commercial, and revival style architecture. The district also includes several of Lemont's government buildings, including its village hall and post office.

The district was added to the National Register of Historic Places on September 6, 2016.
