= Bailey–Michelet House =

Historic house in Illinois, United States

- U.S. National Register of Historic Places
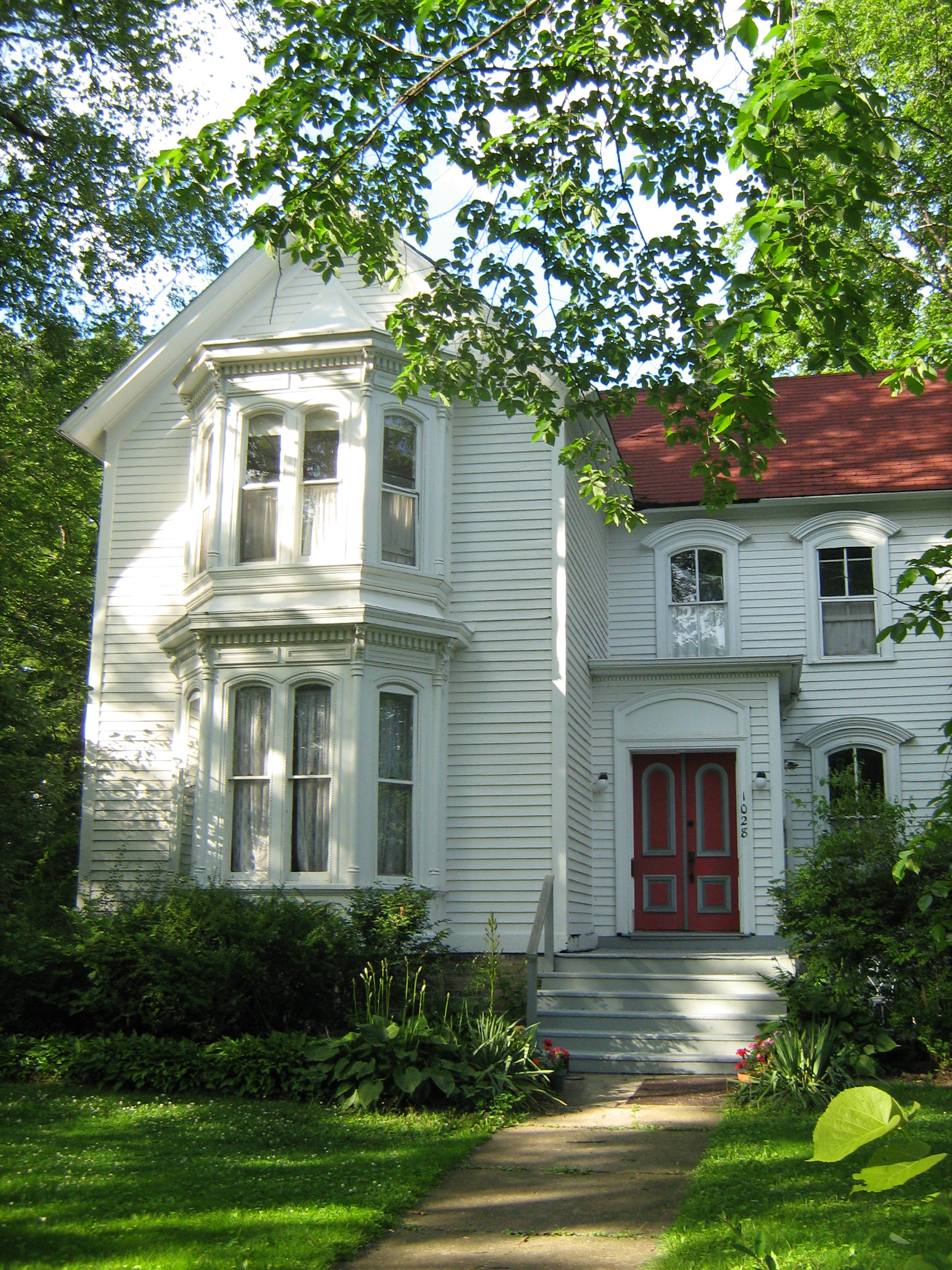

- Location within Illinois Location within the United States
- Location: 1028 Sheridan Road, Wilmette, Illinois
- Coordinates: 42°4′52″N 87°41′40″W
- Area: 0.4 acres (0.16 ha)
- Built: 1871; moved 1896
- Built by: Luther L. Greenleaf
- Architectural style: Italianate
- NRHP reference No.: 82002533
- Added to NRHP: August 12, 1982

The Bailey–Michelet House is a historic Italianate residence on Sheridan Road in Wilmette, Illinois. Originally built in Evanston, it was home to meatpacking businessman William Roberts Bailey and his wife Nancy. In 1896, the house was moved to Wilmette when it was sold to lawyer Charles Jules Michelet. Several generations of Michelet lived in the house. The building was listed on the National Register of Historic Places in 1982.

== History ==
The Bailey–Michelet House was originally constructed on Ridge Avenue, north of Central Street at Maple Street; today the land is part of the Bahá'í Temple. The land was acquired by the William Roberts and Nancy (née McAllister) Bailey in 1872, and a house was built shortly thereafter. William Roberts Bailey came to Evanston shortly before he served with the 8th Regiment Illinois Volunteer Cavalry in the Civil War. After the war, he founded a meat-packing business on Davis Street. The business was very successful due in part to the rapidly growing Evanston population. In 1871, the Bailey–Michelet House was built, probably either by the Baileys themselves or local carpenter Luther L. Greenleaf. Bailey continued to prosper, purchasing the Jennings Opera House. Bailey was also the first Fire Marshall of Evanston and was a member of several local fraternal and business associations. He died suddenly in 1890 at the age of 46.

Nancy Bailey was an Irish immigrant who settled in Evanston to work in the household of former Illinois governor and Northwestern University co-founder John Evans. She managed the Bailey household upon their marriage. Nancy Bailey inherited her husband's estate, valued at $150,000, upon William Roberts Bailey's death. She had a new house built for the family at 2907 Sheridan. Nancy Bailey died on August 22, 1896, while on voyage to Ireland. Shortly before her death, she sold the older family house to Charles Jules Michelet, who moved the house to its present site. The land was adjacent to the house of Michelet's brother.

Michelet was an attorney who practiced in Wilmette. He was the brother-in-law of President of the Illinois Senate Walter Warder. He oversaw a case between the heirs of Nancy Bailey over her will. Bailey's will had been signed under duress from Chicago jeweler Charles Teufel. The estate would have passed entirely to Teufel. After two trials, the house and estate were instead awarded to Bailey's children. As a reward for his service, the children forgave the remainder of the Bailey–Michelet House payment for Michelet. His son Charles J. Michelet, a research engineer, inherited the house. Two subsequent generations of Michelets resided in the house. On August 12, 1982, the house was recognized by the National Park Service on the National Register of Historic Places.

== Architecture ==
The Bailey–Michelet House is a twelve-room, two-story wood-frame house. It was probably built by local carpenter and realtor Luther L. Greenleaf. Although there is no direct evidence of his involvement, Greenleaf was very active in Evanston at the time, particularly in the house's vicinity. Built on a brick foundation, the building is generally of the Italianate style. It was probably strongly based on a house from a pattern book, which were popular for house design at the time. Plate 65 of A. J. Bicknell's Detail, Cottage, and Constructive Architecture may have been the exact model; the house is an enlargement of the pattern. There are two bays, one on the main elevation (on the west end) and one on the south elevation. They are probably based on plate 14 of Bicknell's Designs for Oriel, Bay and Dormer Windows. The main entrance has double doors with bolection moulding and is surrounded by a frame with a rope design. The entrance leads to a small vestibule. Unusual for an Italianate design, the main roof of the house is steeply pitched; a flat roof was more common for the style. This was purportedly done to bear the heavy snows that the house experienced along the shore of Lake Michigan in winter.

On the inside, the house is centered around a two-story main hall. From the entrance, the parlor and dining room are on the left and the library is to the right. The kitchen is in the rear of the property. The parlor has a decorative architrave and cornice. The dining room has similar features as well as a large fireplace. The library has a more intricate architrave and cornice and features a smaller fireplace opposite the bay. A large, curving staircase in the main hall leads to the second floor. It features a walnut octagonal newel post with coffered panels. Walnut balustrades and banister run along the staircase. The second floor houses four bedrooms which open to the main hall gallery. One is above the parlor, one is above the library, and two small bedrooms are above the kitchen. A bathroom and servant's quarters are also over the kitchen. The flooring on the first floor is oak and was probably added in the 1910s. The second floor features original soft wood.
