= Orth House =

Historic house in Illinois, United States

- U.S. National Register of Historic Places
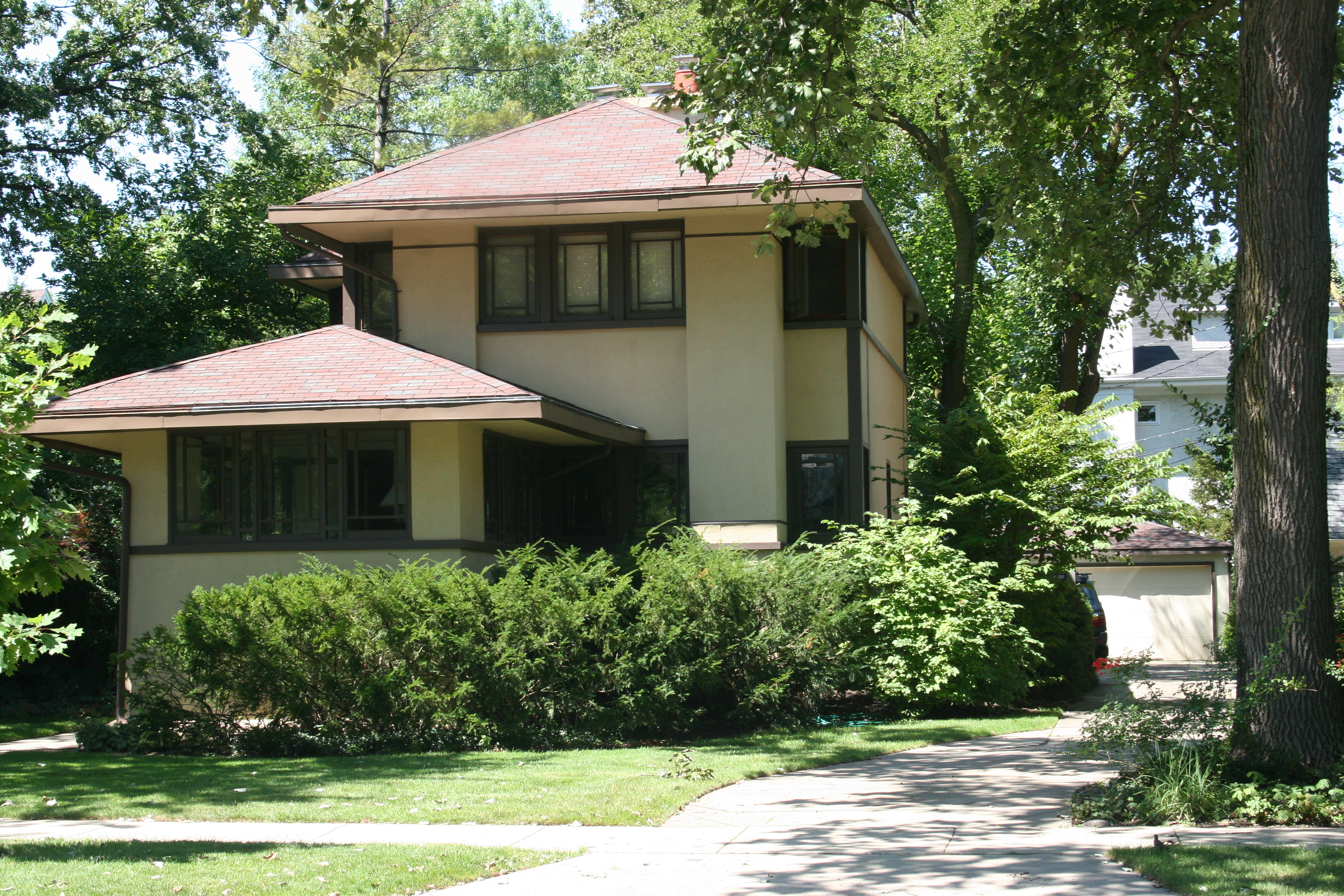

- Location within Illinois Location within the United States
- Location: 42 Abbotsford Rd., Winnetka, Illinois
- Coordinates: 42°5′31″N 87°43′10″W
- Area: less than one acre
- Built: 1908
- Architect: Griffin, Walter Burley
- Architectural style: Prairie School
- NRHP reference No.: 76000708
- Added to NRHP: October 8, 1976

The Orth House is a historic house located at 42 Abbotsford Road in Winnetka, Illinois. Walter Burley Griffin designed the Prairie School house, which was built in 1908. Griffin was a former employee of Frank Lloyd Wright, and he designed the Orth House shortly after starting his own studio when FLW had borrowed money from Griffin and did not repay him. The 1 1/2-story house's design features a stucco exterior with decorative stained wood, casement windows divided into geometric patterns, and an overall horizontal emphasis, all characteristic features of the Prairie School.

The house was added to the National Register of Historic Places on October 8, 1976.
