= Twin Tower Sanctuary =

Historic church in Illinois, United States

- U.S. National Register of Historic Places
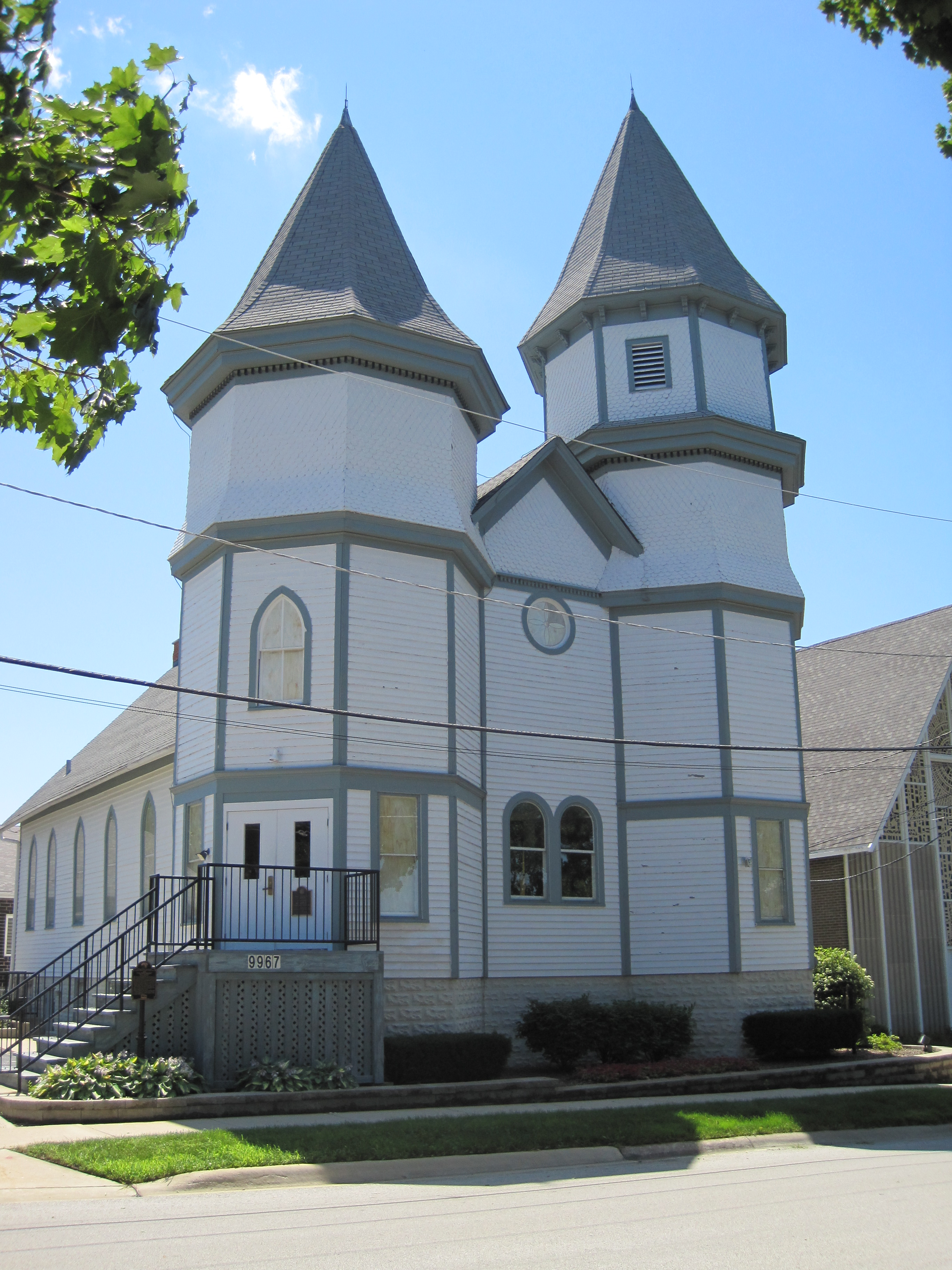

- Location within Illinois Location within the United States
- Location: 9967 W. 144th St., Orland Park, Illinois
- Coordinates: 41°37′43″N 87°51′46″W
- Area: less than one acre
- Built: 1898
- Architect: William Arthur Bennet
- Architectural style: Queen Anne
- NRHP reference No.: 88002235
- Added to NRHP: November 16, 1988

Twin Tower Sanctuary (Old Sanctuary of the United Methodist Church) is a historic Methodist church building at 9967 W. 144th Street in Orland Park, Illinois. The church was completed in 1898, six years after Orland Park was founded, to serve the city's large Methodist population. Architect William Arthur Bennet, who later became well known for his Prairie School works, designed the church in the Queen Anne style. The north side of the church is flanked by the two hexagonal towers that give the church its name. The interior of the church has a Sullivanesque patterned tin ceiling; according to Louis Sullivan scholar Tim Samuelson, it is the best-preserved example of a Sullivanesque tin ceiling in the country.

The church was added to the National Register of Historic Places on November 16, 1988.
