= Mads C. Larson House =

Historic house in Illinois, United States

- U.S. National Register of Historic Places
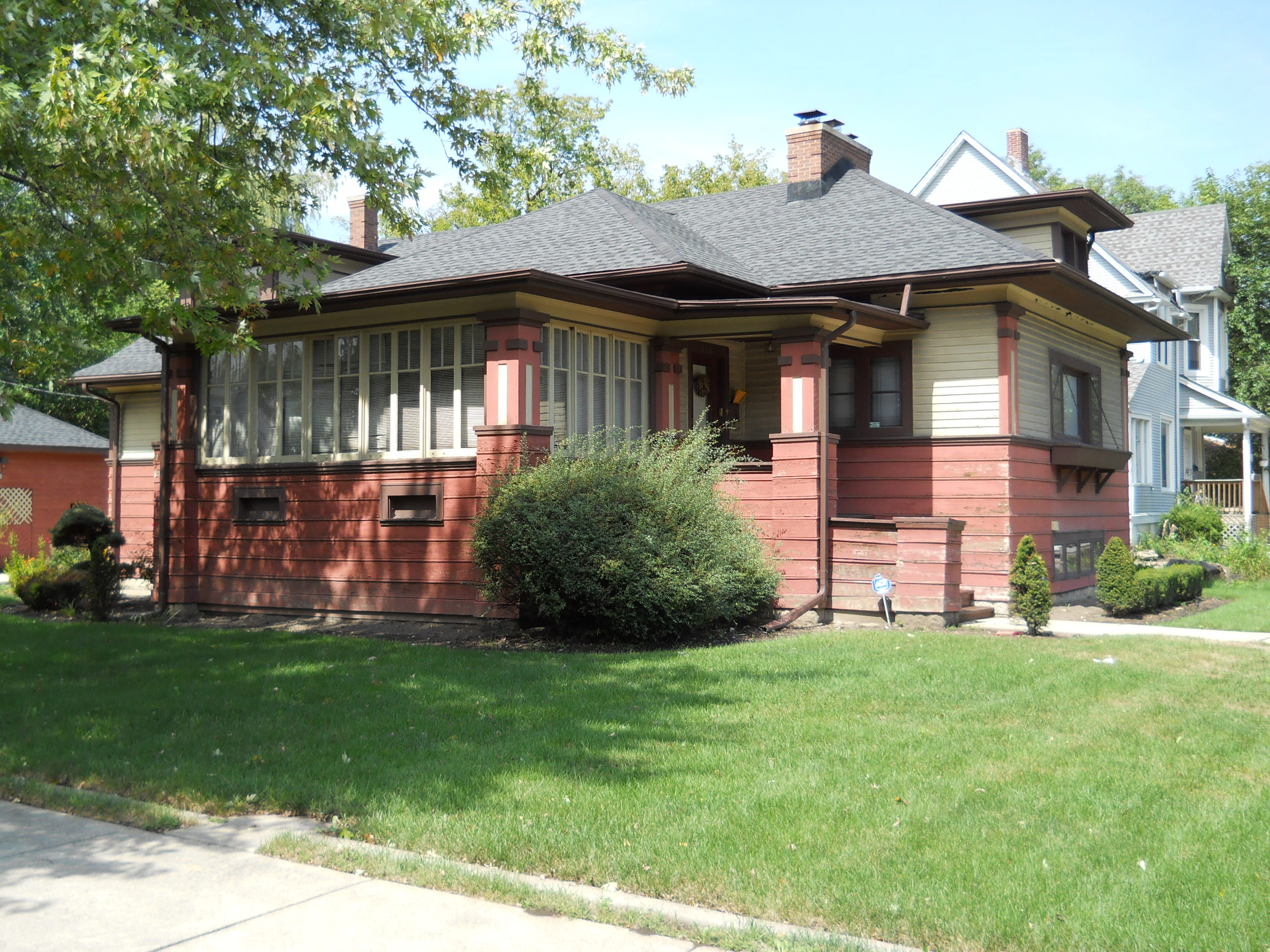

- Location within Chicago metropolitan area Location within Illinois Location within the United States
- Location: 318 S. 1st Ave., Maywood, Illinois
- Coordinates: 41°53′05″N 87°50′05″W
- Area: less than one acre
- Built: 1909
- Architectural style: Arts and Crafts, Bungalow, Prairie School
- MPS: Maywood MPS
- NRHP reference No.: 92000490
- Added to NRHP: May 22, 1992

The Mads C. Larson House is a historic house at 318 S. 1st Avenue in Maywood, Illinois. The house was built in 1909 by Mads C. Larson on land previously owned by the Maywood Company, the development company which planned the village. The Arts and Crafts-designed bungalow also includes many elements of the Prairie School style. Its design has an emphasis on geometry and nature, featuring rectangular piers and pilasters with decorative banding, board-and-batten siding, a row of leaded casement windows, and a glazed sun porch. The interior continues the themes of the design with posts matching the exterior piers, wooden moldings, mullions with the same pattern as the leaded windows, and built-in cabinets.

The house was added to the National Register of Historic Places on May 22, 1992.
