= Central Berwyn Bungalow Historic District =

Historic district in Illinois, United States

- U.S. National Register of Historic Places
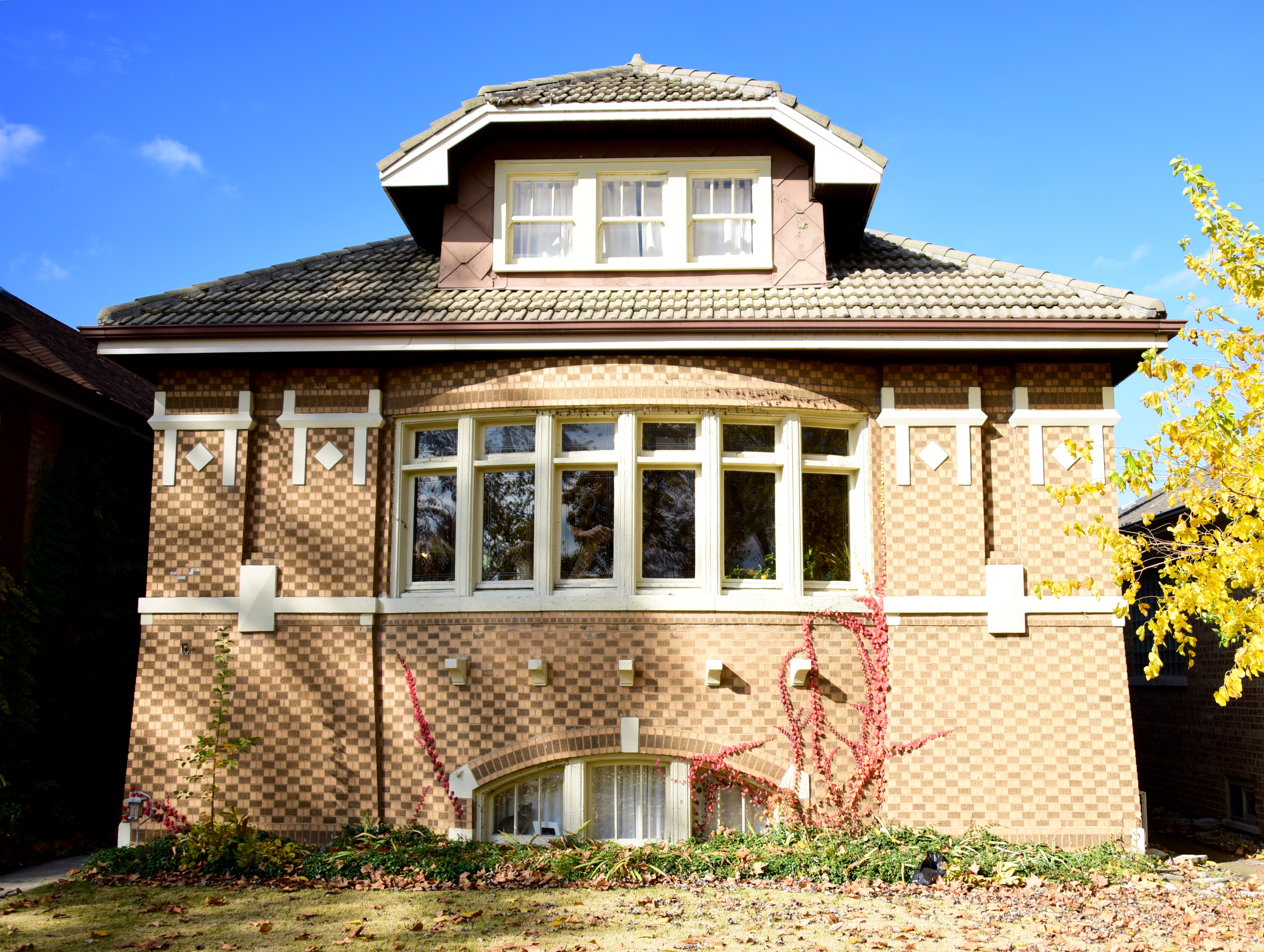

- Location within Chicago metropolitan area Location within Illinois Location within the United States
- Location: Roughly bounded by Cermak Rd., Home, Ridgeland & Cuyler Aves., 26th St., Berwyn, Illinois
- Coordinates: 41°50′47″N 87°47′22″W
- Area: 236 acres (96 ha)
- Architectural style: Chicago Bungalow
- NRHP reference No.: 15000521
- Added to NRHP: August 18, 2015

The Central Berwyn Bungalow Historic District is a residential historic district in Berwyn, Illinois. The district includes 1,358 contributing buildings, 1,109 of which are brick Chicago bungalows and another 156 of which are bungalows in other styles. The homes were built between 1900 and 1949, with the majority of them being built in the mid-1920s. Tens of thousands of bungalows were built in the Chicago area in the early twentieth century, as their affordability made them popular with the working class. Many of Berwyn's bungalows were purchased by Czech Americans, who moved to Berwyn in great numbers in the 1920s and accounted for 25% of the city's population by 1930. While bungalows typically had uniform designs, they were distinguished by their entrances, porches, and roofs, and nearly every possible variation on those features can be found in the district.

The district was added to the National Register of Historic Places on August 18, 2015.
