= George Clayson House =

Historic house in Illinois, United States

- U.S. National Register of Historic Places
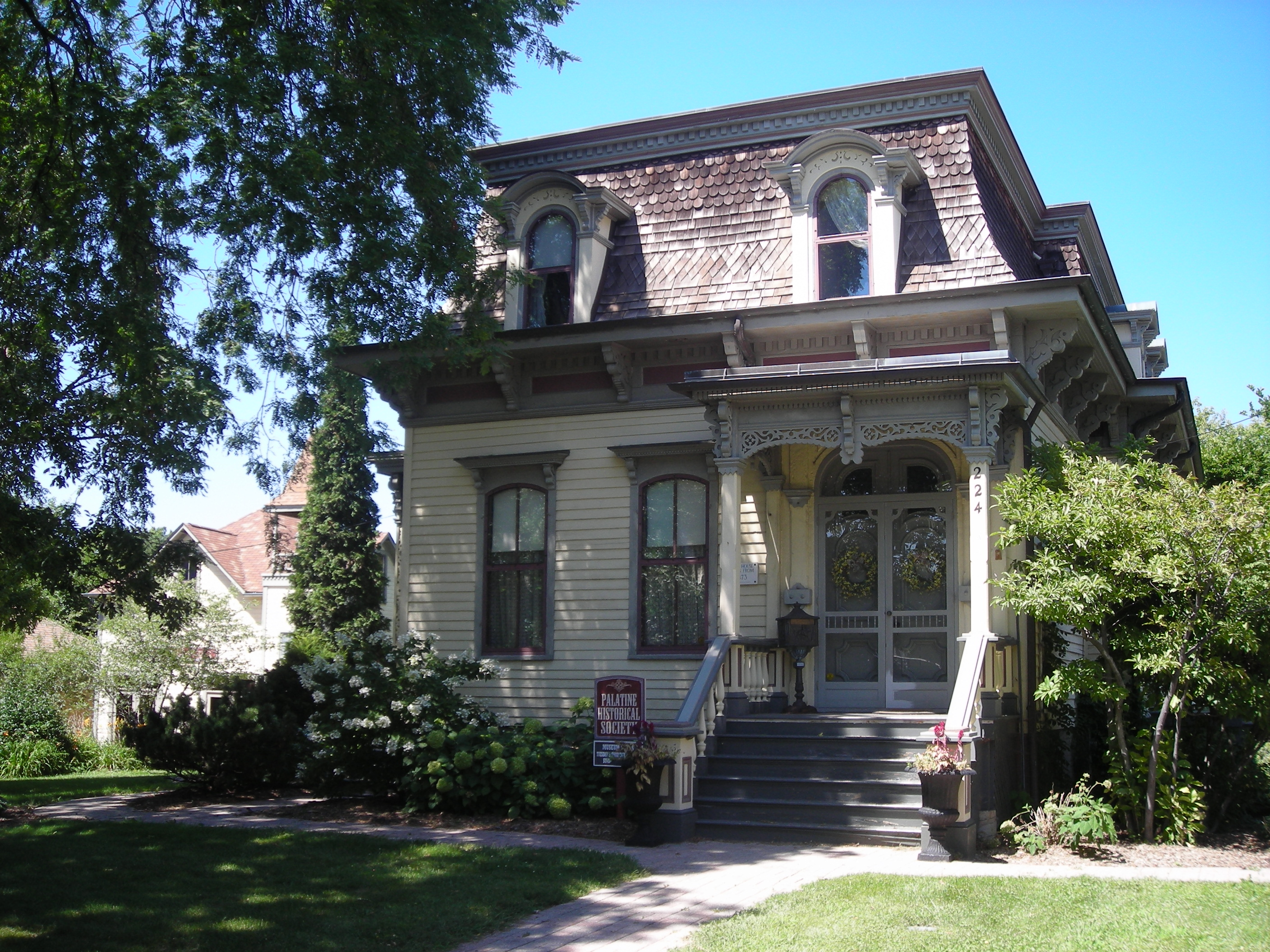

- Location within Chicago metropolitan area
- Location: 224 E. Palatine Rd., Palatine, Illinois
- Coordinates: 42°6′37.17″N 88°2′17.79″W
- Area: 0.4 acres (0.16 ha)
- Built: 1873
- Architectural style: Second Empire
- NRHP reference No.: 79000835
- Added to NRHP: March 21, 1979

The George Clayson House, located at 224 East Palatine Road in Palatine, Illinois, is a Second Empire home built in 1873 that has been restored to its 1890-1900 appearance.

== History ==
George H. Clayson was probably a local carpenter who also operated a grape orchard south of his property. Clayson moved to Palatine, Illinois from New York in the 1860s. He became a member of the Palatine Board of Trustees. Clayson acquired the 10-acre (4.0 ha) property from Denzel F. Robinson in 1873. Clayson sold the house to Moses D. Brown in 1881. Clayson sold the property so that he could move to nearby Nunda to expand his orchard interests. The Palatine Public Library purchased the property in 1975 so that the Palatine Historical Society could rehabilitate it and maintain it as a public museum. On March 21, 1979, the house was recognized by the National Park Service with a listing on the National Register of Historic Places. Today it is still operated as a museum on Tuesdays, Thursdays, and Sundays. It is operated by the historical society and maintained by the Palatine Park District.

== Architecture ==
The house is one of fewer than two dozen buildings in Palatine that are at least 125 years old. It was almost certainly based on a design in a pattern book. Customary to the Second Empire design motif, the house features a prominent Mansard roof. The first floor features a parlor, sitting room, dining room, kitchen, and library. The second floor had five bedrooms. The wood-frame house sits on a brick foundation.
