= Herbert A. Dilg House =

Historic house in Illinois, United States

- U.S. National Register of Historic Places
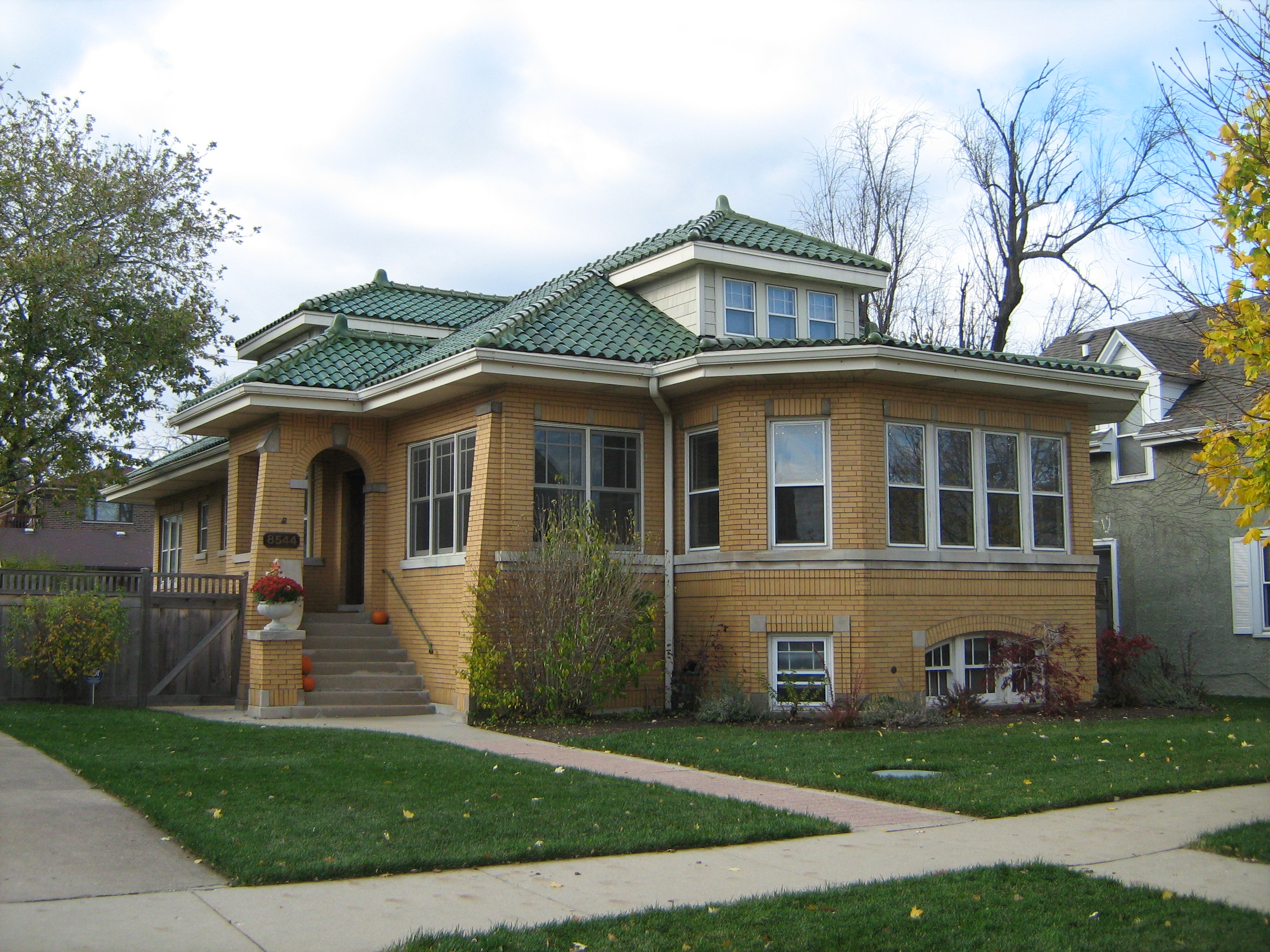

- Location within Chicago metropolitan area Location within Illinois Location within the United States
- Location: 8544 Callie Ave., Morton Grove, Illinois
- Coordinates: 42°02′13″N 87°47′02″W
- Area: less than one acre
- Built: c. 1925-26
- Built by: Herbert A. Dilg
- Architectural style: Chicago bungalow
- NRHP reference No.: 09000781
- Added to NRHP: September 30, 2009

The Herbert A. Dilg House is a historic house at 8544 Callie Avenue in Morton Grove, Illinois. The house was built circa 1925-26 by owner and Morton Grove mayor Herbert A. Dilg. The grandson of an early Morton Grove settler, Dilg served as the village's mayor from 1925 to 1926 and again from 1931 to 1944, overseeing its transition into a suburban community of Chicago. Dilg designed his house in the Chicago bungalow style, a popular choice for middle-class homes in early twentieth century Chicago. The brick house's design includes an octagonal bay containing the living room, a raised front porch at the main entrance, a dormer, and a clay tile roof. Unlike many of the bungalows in the Chicago area, the house is part of a diverse group of houses rather than a row of similar bungalows.

The house was added to the National Register of Historic Places on September 30, 2009.
