= Albert Soffel House =

Historic house in Illinois, United States

- U.S. National Register of Historic Places
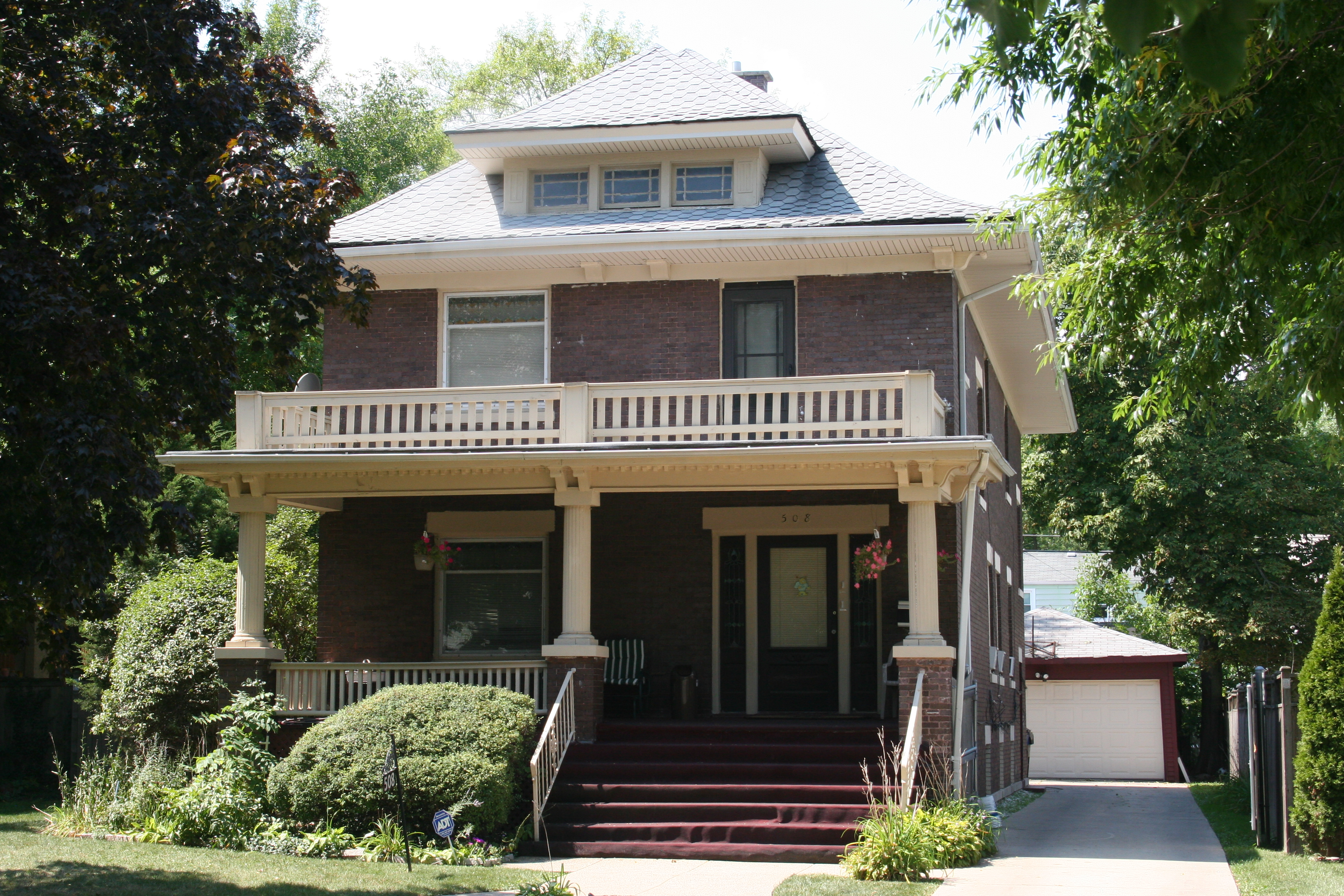

- Location within Chicago metropolitan area Location within Illinois Location within the United States
- Location: 508 N. 5th Ave., Maywood, Illinois
- Coordinates: 41°53′32″N 87°50′23″W
- Area: less than one acre
- Built: 1905
- Architectural style: American Foursquare
- MPS: Maywood MPS
- NRHP reference No.: 92000494
- Added to NRHP: May 22, 1992

The Albert Soffel House is a historic house at 508 N. 5th Avenue in Maywood, Illinois. The two flat house was built in 1905 for original owner Albert Soffel. It has an American Foursquare design, a utilitarian style popular in the early twentieth century, with Arts and Crafts and Neoclassical ornamentation. The house has a typical Foursquare plan with a rectangular layout, a front porch supported by three columns, and a hip roof with a dormer. Its decorative features include Ionic styling on the porch columns, dentillation and brackets on the porch roof, additional bracketing along its eaves, and multiple stained glass windows.

The house was added to the National Register of Historic Places on May 22, 1992.
