= James O'Dea =

James O'Dea may refer to:

- James O'Dea (architect), New Zealand architect
- Jimmy O'Dea (1899-1965), Irish actor and comedian
- James O'Dea Jr. (1922–1995), American lawyer and politician
- Jim O'Dea (born 1949), Australian rules footballer
