= Wilmette, Illinois =

- Village
- Baháʼí House of Worship

- Seal
- Interactive map of Wilmette, Illinois
- Location within Greater Chicago Location within Illinois Location within the United States
- Coordinates: 42°04′38″N 87°43′25″W
- Country: United States
- State: Illinois
- County: Cook
- Incorporated: September 19, 1872

Government
  - President: Senta Plunkett

Area
  - Total: 5.41 sq mi (14.01 km^{2})
  - Land: 5.40 sq mi (13.99 km^{2})
  - Water: 0.0077 sq mi (0.02 km^{2})
- Elevation: 636 ft (194 m)

Population (2020)
  - Total: 28,170
  - Density: 5,215.3/sq mi (2,013.63/km^{2})

Standard of living (2015–19)
  - Per capita income: $87,576
- Time zone: UTC−6 (CST)
  - Summer (DST): UTC−5 (CDT)
- ZIP Code: 60091
- Area codes: 847 and 224
- FIPS code: 17-82075
- Wikimedia Commons: Wilmette, Illinois
- Website: www.wilmette.gov

Wilmette is a village in Cook County, Illinois, United States. It is located on Lake Michigan about 14 miles (23 km) north of the Chicago Loop. The village had a population of 28,170 at the 2020 census.

The first and only Baháʼí House of Worship in North America is located in the village. Wilmette borders the communities of Kenilworth, Winnetka, Skokie, Northfield, Glenview, and Evanston, Illinois.

== History ==
Wilmette was a forested area with high bluffs along its lakeshore. Before European settlement, members of the Potawatomi tribe lived in the area that would later become Wilmette. Native Americans were forced out of the area by treaties in the 1820s and 1830s.

=== 19th century ===
==== Ouilmette family ====
The village is named in honor of Archange and Antoine Ouilmette. On July 29, 1829, as a condition of the Second Treaty of Prairie du Chien, the U.S. government awarded 1,280 acres (5.2 km^{2}) of land in present-day Wilmette and Evanston to Archange Chevallier Ouilmette. The Ouilmettes moved into a cabin that they built on this reserved land.

In the late 1830s, Antoine Ouilmette was involved in litigation against Joseph Fountain of Evanston and others, whom he accused of trespassing and illegally harvesting timber from the Ouilmette family's reservation. Ouilmette lost the suit and paid a large bill in court costs. It was after this that the Ouilmette family decided to leave. In 1838, the Ouilmette family moved to Council Bluffs, Iowa, where many Potawatomi had previously relocated. Archange Chevallier Ouilmette died there on November 25, 1840, and Antoine Ouilmette died there on December 1, 1841.

After Archange's and Antoine's deaths, seven of their children petitioned the federal government for permission to sell the land, as the treaty had stipulated that no part of land could be sold without permission from the President of the United States. All of the children, except for one, were living in Council Bluffs with no intention of moving back. They reasoned that they were living too far away to protect the land from illegal timber poaching. President James K. Polk approved the sale of the land, and in 1845 the entire reservation was collectively sold by the Ouilmette children, save for one sliver that Joseph Ouilmette sold individually at a later date.

==== Early settlement ====
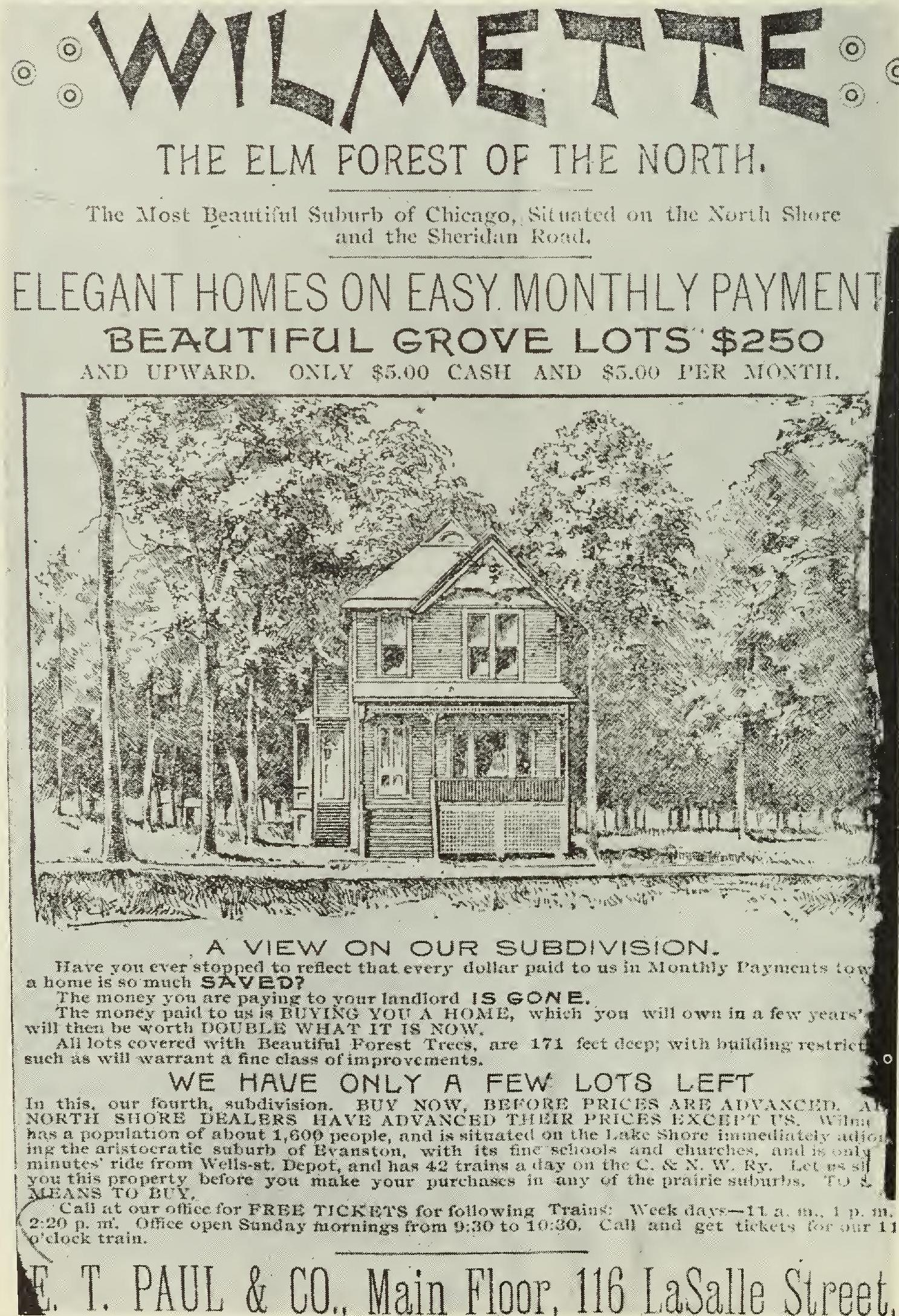
Advertisement for an early subdivision in Wilmette

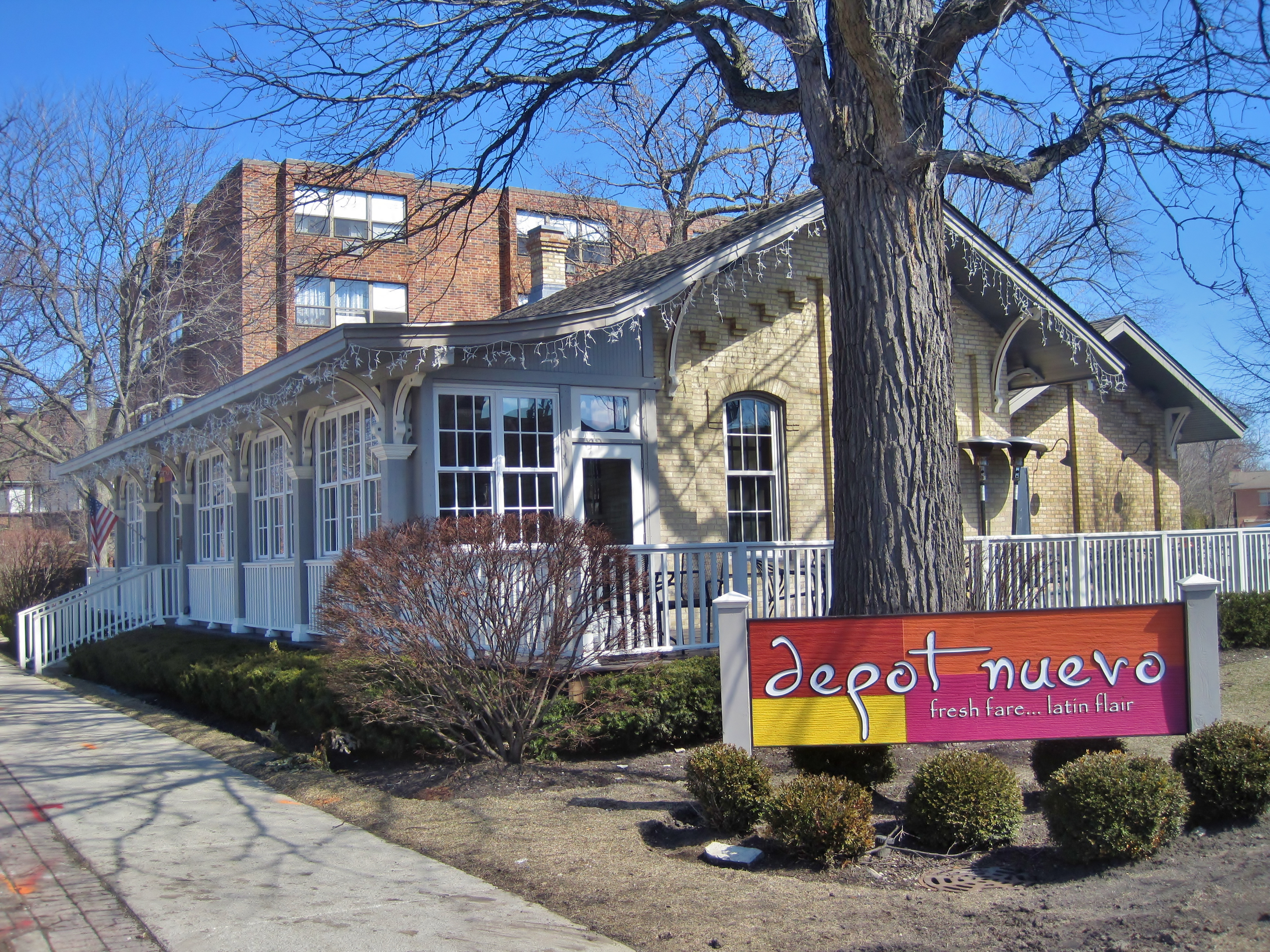
1874 Chicago and Northwestern station, now used as a restaurant space

A number of early settlers worked small farms in the area, many of them near the lakeshore. Mary Dennis, Max Dusham, Charles Beaubien, Simon Doyle, Wendal Alles, Joel Stebbins, and Arunah Hill were among the most prominent members of this thinly settled community, and some of their descendants remained in the area for generations. In the 1850s and 1860s, more prosperous entrepreneurs from New York State and the Eastern seaboard bought out many of these settlers. Among them were Alexander McDaniel (who had arrived in the 1830s, then returned from the California gold rush with money to invest), John G. Westerfield, Henry Dingee, and John Gage. During this period, Illinois more generally was experiencing a high degree of land speculation and settlement.

The Chicago and Milwaukee Railroad tracks were built in 1855, facilitating the settlement of what would become the North Shore. Several large owners of land within the former reservation saw the opportunity to develop a community, and offered to build a station at their own expense if the railway would agree to stop in Wilmette The offer was accepted, and in 1869, the Chicago and Milwaukee Railway (later the Chicago and North Western) began service to the station. The first station burned, but the second one had been finished by 1874 and is still in existence today. This was a predecessor of today's Wilmette station. In 1871 Central School, the community's first public school, was established in a one-room schoolhouse.

The community was officially incorporated on September 19, 1872, as the village of Wilmette, at Andrew Sherman's house on Greenleaf Avenue. John Westerfield, whose large farm on the lakeshore occupied the area where the original Ouilmette cabin had been, was elected as the new village's first president. In 1875, Wilmette's Protestant denominations partnered to construct the Union Evangelical Church at the northeast corner of Wilmette and Lake Avenues, which ultimately failed. In the 1880s the Royal Arcanum Hall, a barn-like building on the northeast corner of Wilmette and Central Avenues, served as a gathering place for local residents, while the train depot served as a polling space during elections.

==== Village of Gross Point ====
German-speaking Roman Catholic farmers from the Mosel Valley near Luxembourg in what is now Germany, many of them from in and around the city of Trier, had begun settling the area in the late 1830s. They developed a cohesive farming community and were active in the governance of New Trier Township (established in 1850), which built roads, schools and drainage ditches. Due to the rural area, it was a difficult place for the Chicago diocese to staff with priests. Eventually, Fr. William Netstraeter was appointed in 1872, and he would serve the faith community for five decades, as well as become a Wilmette trustee for two terms (i.e. mayor) and help found New Trier High School. In 1874, the community was incorporated as the Village of Gross Point, using the traditional voyageur name for the area immediately north of Chicago. Some prominent Gross Point family names include Hoffmann, Braun, Bauer, Schneider, Schaefer, Schaefgen, Reinwald, Bleser, Schwall, Engel, Steffens, Lauermann, Thalmann, Loutsch, Rengel, Nanzig, and Borre. For the next half-century, Gross Point would remain a separate entity from Wilmette. Gross Point remained a small community, with its population never exceeding 500.

St. Joseph Roman Catholic Church was established in 1845 at the corner of Lake Avenue and Ridge Road. In 1873, the church opened a school. Many of the children in Gross Point attended school at St. Joseph, where they were taught by nuns from Milwaukee's School Sisters of St. Francis until 1981; the Archdiocese of Chicago closed the school in 1986, but parish families reopened it a decade later. The German language was frequently used in the classrooms up until World War I, when the school abandoned this practice due to anti-German feeling in the United States. Prior to then, because Masses were only celebrated in German, English-speaking Catholics petitioned the Archdiocese of Chicago to open a second parish in the area, which would become St. Francis Xavier Church in 1904. Upon the death of Fr. Netstraeter in 1924, it was discovered that he bequeathed a large monetary sum of his estate for the construction of a new church. The money was temporarily borrowed by Cardinal George Mundelein, but returned in 1938 and was used to construct the current, St. Joseph's church, which opened in 1939. St. Francis Xavier Church would be merged with St. Joseph Parish in 2019 with much controversy.

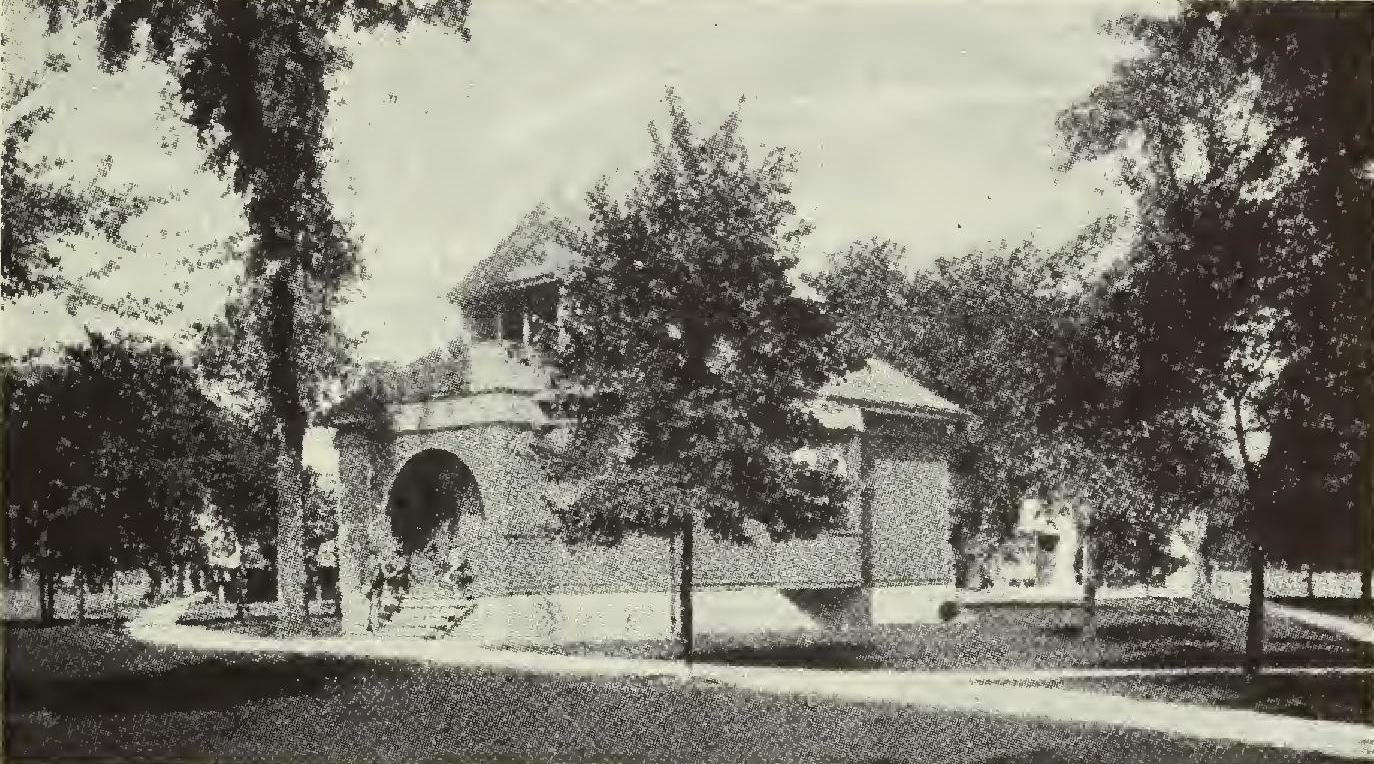
Wilmette constructed its first village hall in 1890.

Taverns were a major business in Gross Point. At least fifteen operated along Ridge Road, the village's eastern boundary, directly across the street from St. Joseph's. These were controversial: many in surrounding communities, especially Evanston (home to the Women's Christian Temperance Union) bitterly opposed the saloon trade, and made several attempts—ultimately successful—to shut it down. Upon the passing of the Eighteenth Amendment to the United States Constitution, there was attempted attack of the St. Josephs rectory where Fr. Netstraeter lived, as he was an advocate for prohibition. In 1897, Gross Point opened up a small public school west of Ridge Road on Wilmette Avenue. The Gross Point Public School was housed in a two-room, two-story brick building built on that had been donated by the Nanzig family. Its building would later become the home of the American Legion Post 46.

==== 1890s ====
By the early 1890s the Chicago & Milwaukee Railroad had double-tracked its line in Wilmette. In 1890 Wilmette constructed its first village hall. In 1892 the village began purchasing treated water from Evanston and had begun to set up telephone service. In 1895 the village established the Wilmette Public Works Department to provide maintenance to the village's infrastructure. In 1897 the railway built a new and larger Frost & Granger-designed station house for its Chicago & Milwaukee station, on the east side of the tracks. The 1874 station building was relocated and used for freight, and later for general storage.

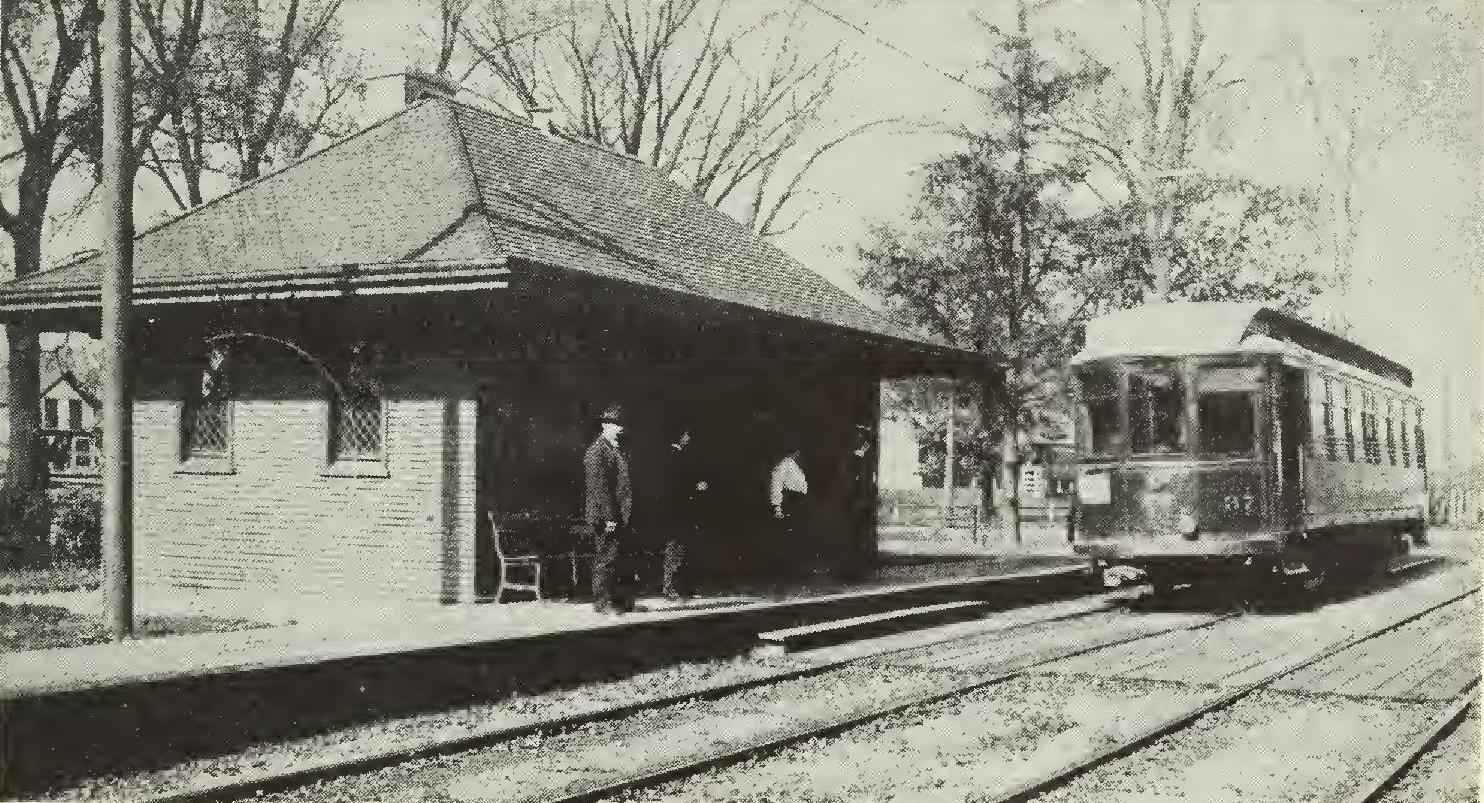
North Shore Line began service through Wilmette in 1899.

The Chicago, North Shore and Milwaukee (North Shore Line) began service in Wilmette in 1899. Its route (from south to north) entered Wilmette along the Northwestern Elevated tracks. After leaving the Linden station, the trains ran west on Greenleaf Avenue, before running north alongside the tracks of the Chicago & Milwaukee railroad. The segment which ran parallel to the Chicago & Milwaukee railroad is today occupied by the 9-mile Green Bay Trail.

Wilmette was home to a variety of social and literary clubs. Among these was the Wilmette Woman's Club, which was founded in 1891 as a reading club but quickly expanded to embrace a wide variety of philanthropic activities. Another was the Sunday Evening Supper Club, which would host such prominent speakers as William Jennings Bryan and Jane Addams.

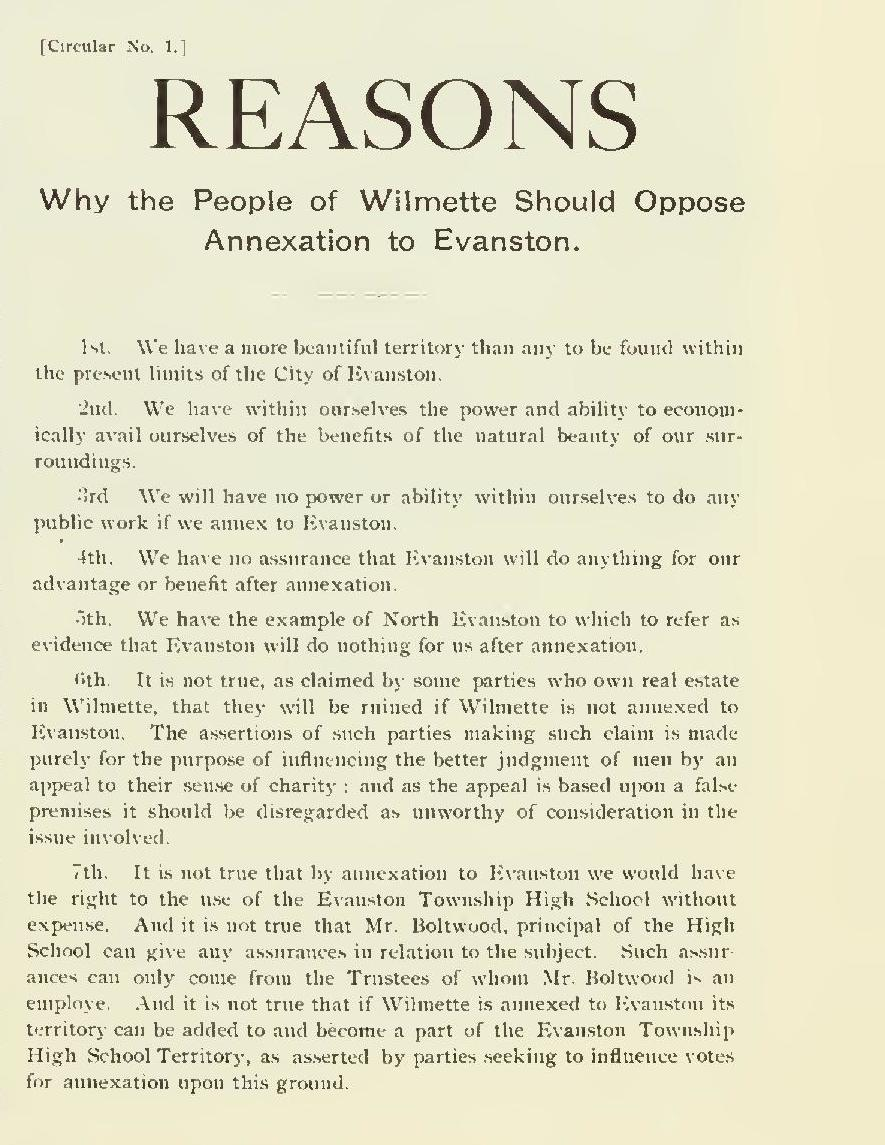
Circulator opposing annexation

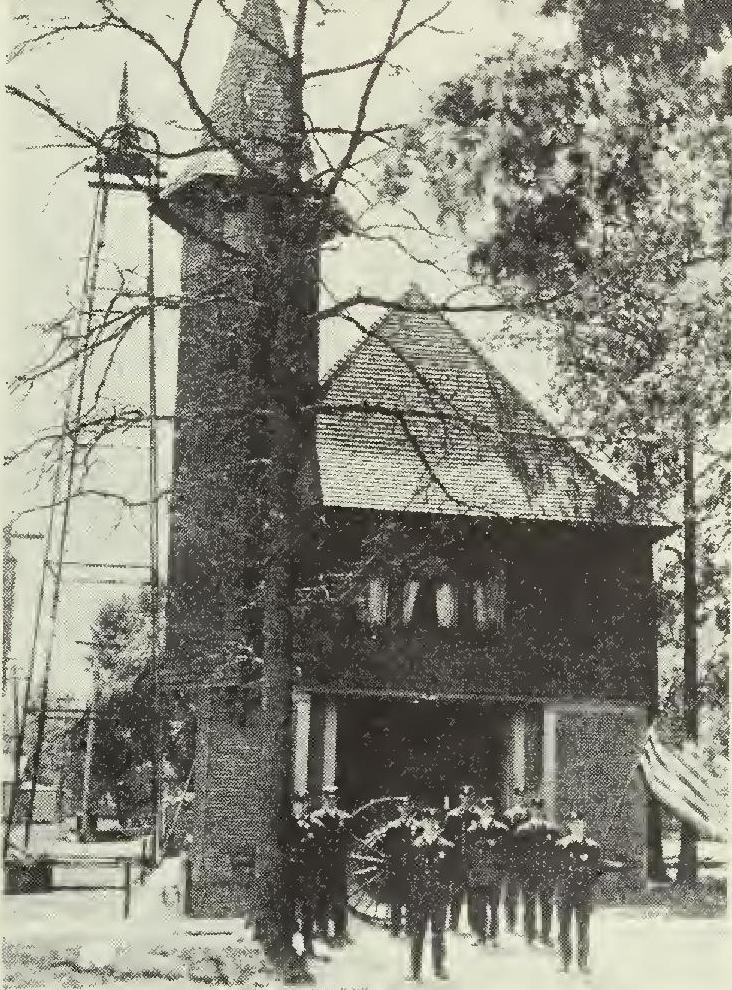
Among the improvements to the village's services was the construction of a central fire station.

Referendums were held in 1894 and 1897 over whether Wilmette should seek to be annexed by neighboring Evanston. Proponents wanted to take advantage of Evanston's then superior fire, police, and water services, as well as Evanston Township High School. One annexation referendum lost by a vote of 168 to 165; three others also failed. Following the result of these votes, the village improved its own services. Among the efforts at improving the village's services was the construction of a central fire station in 1899. Paving of the village streets with specially made bricks began in earnest at this time, as well. New Trier High School, built in Winnetka but also drawing students from Wilmette, was opened in 1901.

A series of new schools were built in the nineties to serve Wilmette's growing community. In 1892 an eight-classroom brick school building was built to house Central School, replacing the previous one-room structure. Logan school was opened in 1893 on Kline Street as a one-room school house. Its building would subsequently be expanded. Today, McKenzie Elementary School stands at the former site of Logan School.

=== 20th century ===
==== Early 20th century ====
Sheridan Road opened on October 8, 1900. This opened up the North Shore to automobiles, providing a north–south arterial roadway along the lakeshore.

In 1900, by a margin of 62 to 52, village residents approved a referendum to establish a free public library, thus establishing the Wilmette Public Library. In 1905, with the assistance of funds from Andrew Carnegie, the village was able to erect a new building for its library at the corner of Park and Wilmette Avenues.

The North Shore Channel, which terminates in Wilmette, was a crucial part of the huge engineering and sanitary project to reverse the course of the Chicago River in order to carry Chicago's sewage away from Lake Michigan. In 1907, upon beginning construction of the North Shore Channel, Sanitary District of Chicago president Robert R. McCormick noted that the construction of the canal would ultimately create approximately twenty-two acres of landfill from excavated materials next to the mouth of the canal. Illinois law stipulated that an organized Park District had the authority to, without any cost, take possession of any man-made land for use as parkland. Citizens, thereafter, petitioned for a vote to be held on the prospect of establishing Park District.

An election was held January 1908, with 174 votes in favor of creating a park district and 37 votes against it. The Wilmette Park District Board of Commissioners was appointed, serving the entirety of the village, as well as a segment of northeast Evanston (responsibility for which was later assumed by the Evanston Park District). The Wilmette Park District's Board of Commissioners held their first meeting on February 17, 1908. State legislation was passed May 25, 1911, granting the Park District ownership of the landfill. Ultimately, the Park District gained ownership of a riparian property stretching between Lake Avenue and Forest Avenue. Today, this land forms much of Gillson Park. The excavated material that formed the landfill turned out to largely consist of a relatively impervious blue clay. Mulchings and plantings began part of a years-long process of transforming the landfill into usable parkland. The North Shore Channel project, completed in 1909, also resulted in the creation of Wilmette Harbor.

Wilmette's first informal beach was established at the foot of Elmwood Avenue in 1910. Wooden steps were constructed down the bluff to allow access to the beach from the street. In 1914 the Wilmette Beach Improvement Association was founded to clean up the village's unsupervised shoreline. The group established an official swimming beach at the foot of Lake Avenue, the site of today's Gillson Beach, with facilities including a bathhouse, swings, benches, and umbrellas.

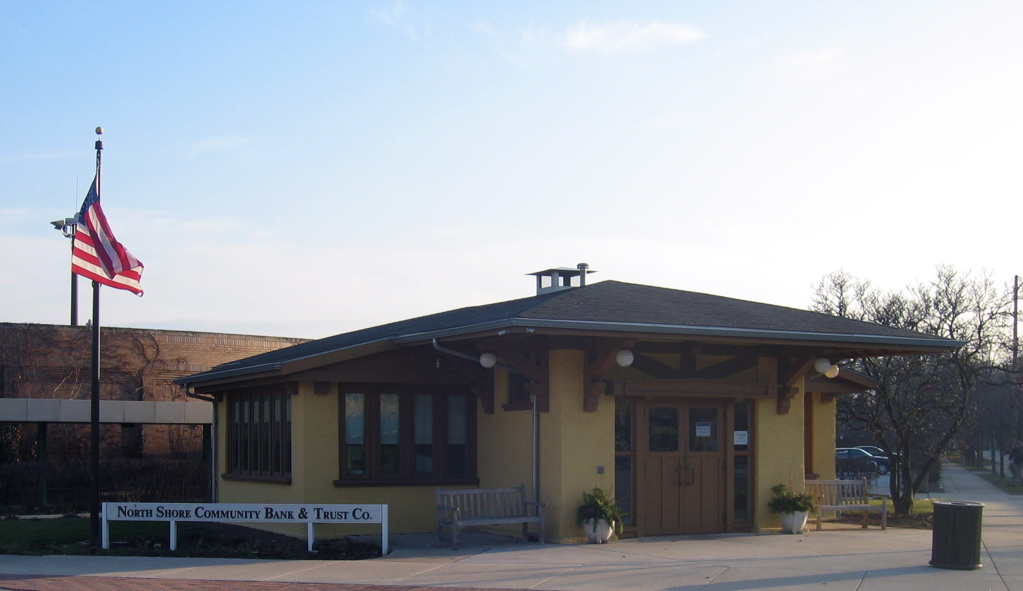
Original Linden station building (pictured in 2006)

In 1912 the Northwestern Elevated Railroad (today's Chicago Transit Authority Purple Line) extended its service into Wilmette. This occurred without permission from the village, as the tracks were extended from the route's existing terminal in Evanston into the village's border under the cover of darkness before the morning of April 1, 1912. Later that year, a second track was added in Wilmette and the station's platform was elongated. In 1913 the tracks were extended deeper into the village and the makeshift station that had been constructed under the cover of darkness was replaced with two new stations in Wilmette at Isabella and Linden, the latter of which was designed by Arthur U. Gerber and served as the line's terminus.

More than 400 men from Wilmette and Gross Point Village served during World War I. 150 of them served overseas, thirteen (12 from Wilmette, and one from Gross Point) lost their lives in the war. Many women back home volunteered in the Wilmette branch of the American Red Cross Auxiliary. By 1918 the village of Wilmette had increased its population to 5,000 from a population of only 1,500 twenty years earlier. The Wilmette Health Center (a free clinic) was founded that same year.

==== Interwar growth ====
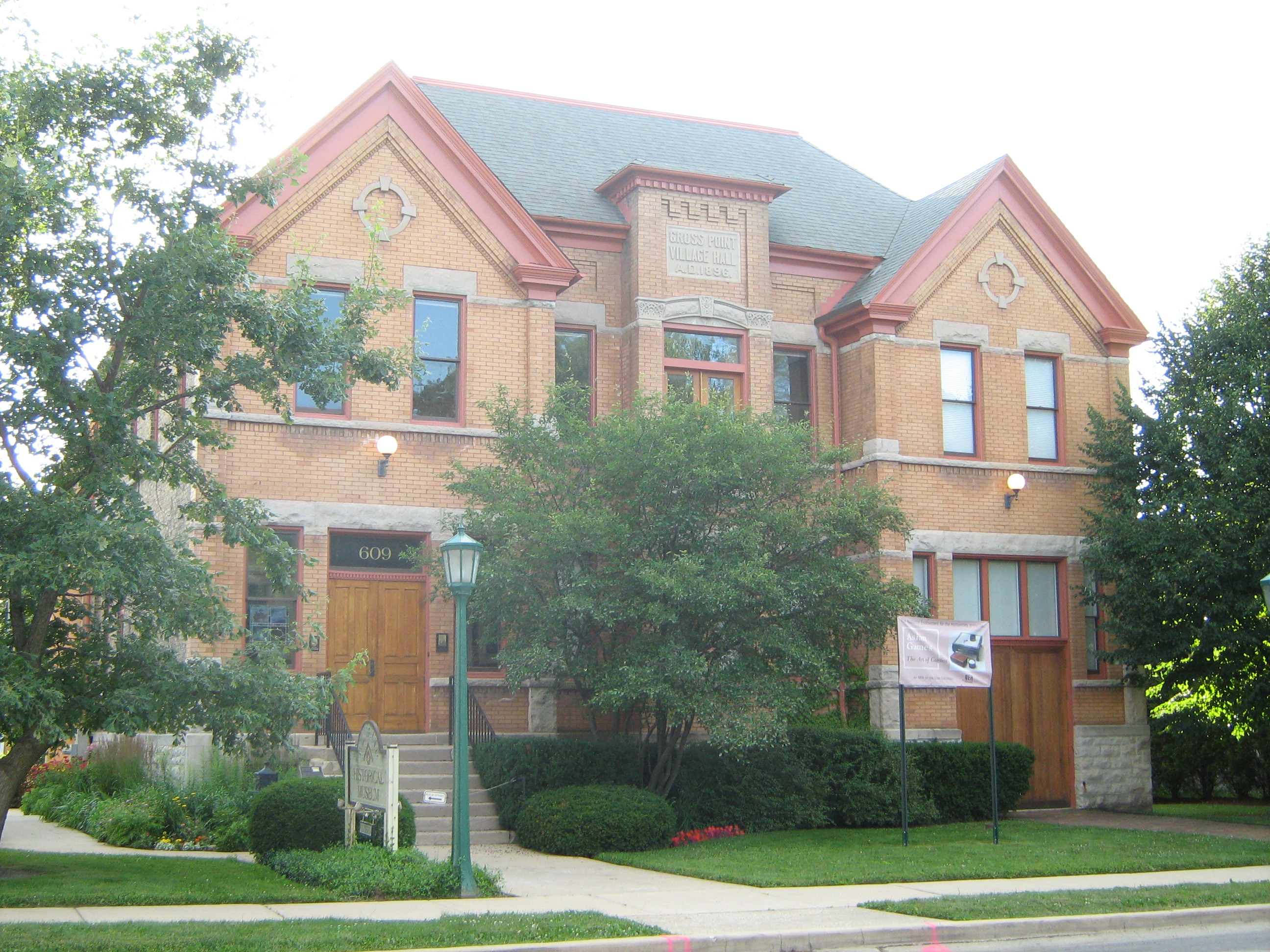
The former Gross Point Village Hall, now home to the Wilmette Historical Museum. Gross Point was dissolved in 1919 and subsequently annexed into Wilmette.

Between 1900 and 1920, the village saw its population more than triple to 7,814. In 1922 the village adopted the "Plan of Wilmette", which outlined a vision for its future that included open spaces along Green Bay Road and the elevation of the railroad tracks to provide unobstructed flow of traffic between the east and west parts of the village. While few of these specific plans ever materialized, the 1922 plan represents the beginning of zoning as a mode of shaping the village's development.

In 1919, the neighboring village of Gross Point was dissolved due to bankruptcy. It was subsequently annexed by Wilmette, with one part being annexed in 1924 and the rest in 1926. Wilmette issued a permit approving construction of its first apartment building in early 1924, the Linden Crest Apartments at the intersection Fifth Street and Linden. This launched a controversy, and a "No Flats" campaign was held during the following year's election. Consequentially, very few apartment buildings would be constructed in the village for the next four decades.

The oldest surviving Bahá'í House of Worship began construction in 1920 (it would not be completed until 1953). Across Sheridan Road from the Bahá'í property, Wilmette Harbor experienced a plethora of changes in the twenties.

The Sheridan Shore Yacht Club opened in Wilmette Harbor during the 1920s. The club was housed in a space on the lower floor of the Marshall mansion (architect Benjamin Marshall's opulent residence and studio), which sat along Sheridan Road on the south side of the harbor. Marshall had allowed the club to be located in his mansion as a compromise with the village. The village had previously been unwilling to rezone the property to permit him to house his commercial offices there. As a result, Marshall had been unable to get a building permit for the home. Marshall made an offer to members of the headquarterless organization, he would let them house their headquarters in the basement of the studio if they could convince the village to issue a permit. Soon afterwards, the village was convinced to issue a permit allowing for the construction of a "clubhouse-studio". Marshall constructed his forty-room pink-stucco Spanish Colonial Revival mansion from 1922 until 1924 and decorated it with rare art and furniture. It was said to have cost somewhere between $500,000 and $1,000,000 to construct. The house was built into a bluff so that only one of its three stories was visible at street level. The residence featured an enclosed tropical greenhouse with a swimming pool and a Chinese temple room featuring a 500-year-old mandarin bed (the Chinese temple room was said to have cost $87,000). also had an Egyptian solarium that featured a table which rose through the floor, rising up from a butler's pantry beneath it. The house's furnishings included a tapestry which Louis XV once presented to Madame de Pompadour. It was one of the North Shore's most extravagant residences.

Development of Wilmette's 'Indian Hill Estates' subdivision began in 1926. The subdivision featured long winding roads named after Native American tribes, and its homes were built on well-manicured lots featuring deep setbacks. The early homes developed were given European styles and names.

In the 1920s, No Man's Land, an unincorporated area to the north, experienced a period of tremendous exuberance. The Spanish Court, one of the nation's earliest automobile-centered shopping developments, was constructed in No Man's Land. Building began on such private clubs as the Miralago Ballroom, an early Art Deco building designed by George Fred Keck, which opened in 1929. Teatro del Lago, an opulent movie house, opened in 1927.

==== Great Depression era ====
In 1931 Universal Oil Products co-founder Carbon Petroleum Dubbs was elected Village President. At the time that he took office, the village was approaching bankruptcy. To stabilize its finances, Dubbs cut the village's budget and refused his salary. In 1932, despite the onslaught of a national depression, Dubbs was able to finish construction on Lochmoor, his Phillip Brooks Maher-designed lakefront mansion located along Wilmette's Michigan Avenue. Construction of the residence cost him $200,000. On January 27, 1934, the village celebrated the opening of its own water plant that was completed largely due to Dubbs' commitment to the project. The village had previously been purchasing its water from Evanston. Not only did Wilmette start pumping its own water, but by the year 1938 Wilmette was selling water to Glenview. By the end of Dubbs' tenure as Village President in 1935, Wilmette had become fiscally solvent.

During the depression, the Works Progress Administration program undertook a project in Wilmette to resurface brick streets. Bricks were removed and relaid upside-down, exposing a smooth non-weathered side. Another WPA project that was undertaken was the refurbishment of Wilmette pier, which is located just north of the mouth of Wilmette Harbor and had originally been built in 1906. An additional WPA project broke ground in 1936, beginning construction on a lakefront amphitheater at Gilson Park. The venue, now known as the Wallace Bowl (in honor of Gordon Wallace, Park District superintendent from 1936 until 1968), opened the following year.

In 1931 Green Bay Road was opened, supplementing Sheridan Road's role as a north–south arterial route through the North Shore. A Coast Guard station was established in Wilmette Harbor in 1931. In 1933 the village restricted the use of unofficial beaches, such as the one at the foot of Elmwood Avenue. Despite this people still continued to visit the Elmwood beach until the village constructed a fence to block street access to it in the 1960s.

Among the residents that were affected by the depression was architect Benjamin Marshall, who was forced to sell his house to Nathan Goldblatt (of the Goldblatt's chain). As a result of this change of ownership, the Sheridan Shores Club was evicted from their headquarters in the lower floor of the Marshall Mansion. In 1937 the Sheridan Shore Yacht Club constructed a new clubhouse at Wilmette Harbor. The Goldblatt family offered to gift the former Marshall mansion to the village for use as a community center. However, the village declined their offer. The opulent mansion was ultimately demolished in 1949 and 1950.

The Depression halted most home construction for the first half of the 1930s. However, by the middle of the decade construction slowly resumed. The homes being constructed, however, were far more modest than those that had been constructed in the previous decade. Among the homes built in this period were several designed by George Fred Keck. Much of the village's 'Kenilworth Gardens' subdivision was developed during this time. Much of the Indian Hills Estates was also developed at this time, with the assistance of federal loans.

In November 1934, Monsignor John Neumann oversaw the building of a new school for St. Joseph Catholic Church (Wilmette, Illinois). It was the only building constructed in the entire Midwest that year. President Roosevelt sent a letter commending Monsignor Neumann and St. Joseph's for their courage in undertaking the large task during the Great Depression.

The Great Depression greatly impacted No Man's Land, forcing the closure of Vista del Lago. A fire that broke out in the Miralago on the night of March 8, 1932, severely damaged the building along with many nearby properties (such as the structures abandoned by the defunct Breaker's Beach Club and Vista del Lago), thus tolling the final death knell for an exuberant era of No Man's Land's history.

==== World War II ====
Wilmette's first brush with Nazi Germany came by way of a financial lawsuit against St. Joseph Catholic Church (Wilmette, Illinois). In the wake of Chicago Cardinal George Mundelein's criticisms of Adolf Hitler in 1937, (see Paper hanger (Mundelein's speech)), ridiculing Hitler for his mistreatment of Catholics, St. Joseph's was unexpectedly sued by a family in Germany, claiming to be relatives of the deceased Fr. William Netstraeter, a key figure in the expansion of Wilmette who died in 1924, thirteen years prior. Fr. Netstaeter had bequeathed a sum of $300,000 from his real-estate business for St. Joseph's, which was being held in the bank account of the Archdiocese of Chicago, under Cardinal Mundelein's supervision. The lawsuit was blatantly political and clearly orchestrated by the Nazi Party in retaliation for Cardinal Mundelein's "one armed paper hanger" remark. A Chicago circuit court validated Fr. Netstraeter's will, and the money was quickly rewarded to the Archdiocese, ergo St. Joseph's. Folklore believes that Cardinal Mundelein told his chief architect, Joseph W. McCarthy, to "Put the money into brick!" and construction of a large new church was instantly underway (completed in October 1939). It is believed that had Hitler/the Nazi's obtained the money, it would have gone towards Nazi military.

After the Attack on Pearl Harbor in December 1941, village life revolved around the war effort: bond drives, air raid drills, scrap drives, and victory gardens were the order of the day. The Wilmette Council of Civil Defense, under the chairmanship of David C. Leach, organized a wide range of activities, including classes designed to train citizens in first aid, fire-fighting, demolition, marksmanship, and bomb disposal. Air raid wardens for every block enforced blackouts and manned battle stations during drills. On Sunday, May 23, 1943, a mock air raid on the village dropped hundreds of paper-bag "bombs" of brightly colored streamers, to test local readiness. Eighty-three service members from Wilmette lost their lives during the war.

The Wilmette Coast Guard Station was given an increased workload during World War II, placing a heavy burden on the station's staff of 40 men. The voluntary civilian Wilmette Coast Guard Auxiliary was formed to assist the station's guardsmen during the war. Many of the Auxiliary's 64 members came from the Sheridan Shore Yacht Club and used their personal vessels to assist in operations.

In 1942, after a long legal battle, Wilmette annexed No Man's Land. In August 1943 a ship named the USS Wilmette was given the honor of transporting President Franklin D. Roosevelt, Admiral William D. Leahy, James F. Byrnes and Harry Hopkins on a 10-day cruise to McGregor and Whitefish Bay to plan strategies for World War II. The USS Wilmette was a naval ship that had been commissioned in 1918 and was constructed by retrofitting the former SS Eastland, a passenger ship which in July 1915 rolled over in the Chicago River resulting in 884 deaths (the largest loss of life from a single shipwreck in Great Lakes history).

==== Postwar growth ====
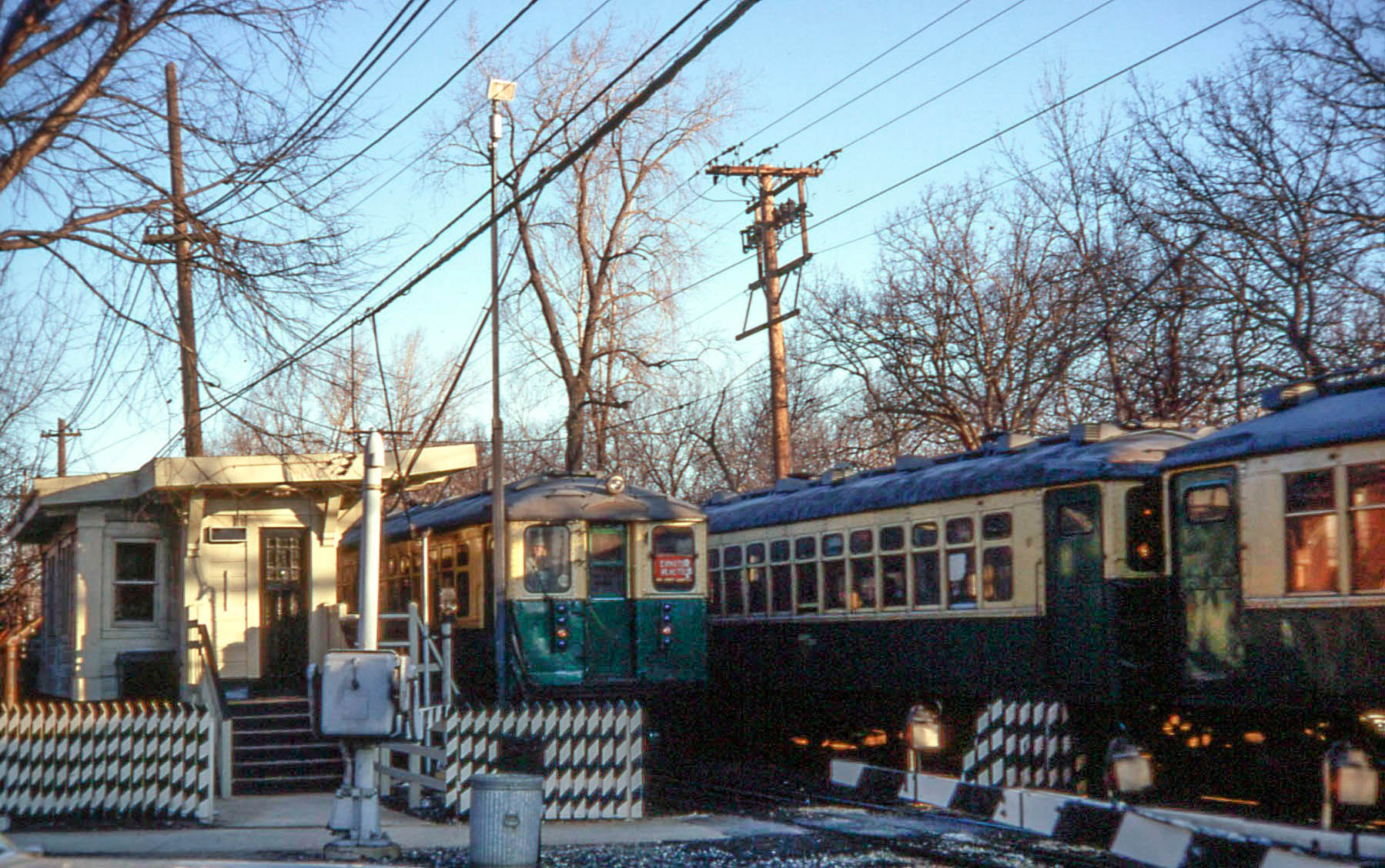
Isabella station (pictured in 1968)

The postwar need for housing, combined with government-guaranteed loans and the availability of former farmland west of Ridge Road, led to a housing boom in the 1950s that utterly transformed the area west of Ridge Road from farmland to residential subdivisions. Tracts of ranch-style and bi-level houses, distinctive street layouts, and new schools, places of worship, and shopping centers quickly characterized much of west Wilmette, particularly west of Hunter Road. Builders reflected the country's optimistic postwar mood with upbeat names for their housing styles, like "Young Modern" and "Skylark" and idyllic-sounding subdivision names like "Hollywood in Wilmette" and "Sprucewood Village". As a direct result of this housing boom, Wilmette's population grew from 18,162 in 1950 to 28,268 a decade later.

Construction began on the Edens Expressway in the late 1940s, and it opened in 1951. Carson Pirie Scott opened Edens Plaza shopping center next to the new expressway in 1956. Wilmette saw a growth in youth sports during this period. The boy's youth Wilmette Baseball Association was founded in 1951. In 1953 the village opened Roemer Park, a Little League baseball park with features such as a concession stand and scoreboard. By 1962 the Wilmette Baseball Association had more than 900 youth players (including Bill Murray) and 52 teams. Also in 1951, Wilmette Public Library built a new facility, replacing the facility that had been built in 1905. The North Shore Line ceased its service in Wilmette in 1955.

In 1968 the Curtis Curling Center, a state-of-the-art curling facility, opened in Wilmette. Its construction was funded by a $400,000 donation from Darwin Curtis, a millionaire from the neighboring town of Winnetka and a $39,000 grant from the Wilmette Memorial Trust.

Between 1962 and 1968 the area that was once No Man's Land saw massive redevelopment. Several high-rise apartment towers and town homes were built, and the Spanish Court shopping center was renovated and renamed Plaza del Lago.

==== Village centennial and national bicentennial ====
The village marked the 1972 centenary of its incorporation with festivities on the lawn of Village Hall. The Curtis Curling Center hosted that year's United States Men's Curling Championship.

In 1973 Wilmette adopted a new comprehensive plan (which had been developed between the years 1967 and 1971). In 1974 the village adopted a new zoning ordinance designed to adhere to the vision of the comprehensive plan.

Centennial Park, named in honor of the village's centenary, was opened that year. The Park District had begun buying the land for Centennial Park in 1967, but did not finish buying the last parcels until 1972. In 1971 the Park District proposed building a sports complex at this site. Previous plans to construct a sports complex (featuring a swimming pool, children's park, bath house/warming house, natural ice rink, and a toboggan hill) on the site of the Community Playfield were blocked afters voters narrowly opposed it in a 1968 referendum. However, the Park District was successful in its proposal for a sports complex at Centennial Park, which was approved by voters as part of a $1.78 million parks renovation plan in a February 1971 referendum. The sports complex was completed in 1972 with a public swimming pool and indoor tennis complex. In 1974, following lobbying from local ice skating and ice hockey enthusiasts, the Park District broke ground on an expansion project that added an indoor ice complex and additional tennis courts to the sports complex. Centennial Ice Center opened to local ice enthusiasts the following year.

A portion of the land that the Park District acquired for Centennial Park was a farm belonging to Michael Loutsch, the last working farm in the village. A compromise was reached in 1968 where the Park District allowed Loutsch to continue operating his farm until his death, at which point the village would assume control of the land. Centennial Park was therefore developed around his farm. Per their agreement, the Park District assumed control over the land after Loutsch's death in 1978. Thus, over one hundred years after its incorporation, Wilmette completed its transformation from a farming settlement into a bustling suburb.

In 1972 Northwestern University decided to sell a 106-acre golf course it owned on Lake Avenue, and offered for the village to buy it. Concerned that it might otherwise become a massive subdivision development, community groups and citizens organized to lobby for its preservation as open land. In June 1972 voters overwhelmingly voted in favor of approving $4.4 million in Park District tax bonds to finance the purchase (with 5,704 votes in favor and 785 in opposition). In November 1972 a Cook County Circuit judge set the appraisal of the land at $4.2 million, and the Wilmette Park District acquired the course.

The same month in which the Park District acquired the golf course, citizens sent petitions to both the Park District and the Village Board requesting a referendum proposing that the Park District buy and preserve an 11-acre plot of land on the Mallinckrodt College property. The land had already been under contract, with its owners (the Society of the Sisters of Christian Charity) planning to sell it to a developer who intended to build 43 single-family homes. The referendum was held January 16, 1973, with voters rejecting the proposal. As a result, the parcel of land in question was developed into homes.

On July 16, 1973, the Chicago Transit Authority ceased service at the Isabella station, leaving the Linden Station as the village's sole CTA station. In 1974 Wilmette launched a village bus system named Wilbus.

In 1974 the Chicago & North Western Railroad planned to demolish the structure of the former 1897 station house, which it had previously been using for storage. The village saved the structure from demolition relocating it from its position along the Chicago & Northwestern tracks to elsewhere downtown. The structure is now recognized as a local landmark and is listed on the National Register of Historic Places. In 1975 Wilmette built a new structure to replace its 1874 railroad station. The new station began serving commuters in September, and the 1874 station was razed in order to make room for parking behind the new Village Hall.

The village had begun construction on a new Village Hall in 1973. The project would replace the 1910 Village Hall. It was completed in 1975. However, its dedication ceremony would be held on Independence Day of the following year (the bicentennial day for the adoption of the United States' Declaration of Independence).

==== Late 20th century ====
In 1978, deficits forced the village to close the Curtis Curling Center only a decade after it first opened. The space was used for a televised Guinness world record-setting 135,000 piece domino show in 1979, but would otherwise sit vacant until being converted into a senior housing complex named The Atrium in 1982. Despite the closure of the Curtis Curling Center, the Wilmette Curling Club continues to exist (albeit without a facility of their own). They won the 1984 United States Men's Curling Championship and represented the United States at the 1985 men's World Curling Championships where they ultimately tied with Denmark to place 3rd overall.

In the 1970s, Wilmette experienced a post-baby boom drop in primary school education. As a result, the village closed three schools (including Bell School). The village also closed Highcrest Middle School, but retained ownership to accommodate a potential re-opening in the future. Highcrest was subsequently used by the village as a community recreation center and was for a time the home of the Wilmette Historical Museum.

In 1973 the Park District had purchased (with the assistance of a federal grant) a 4.8 acre parcel of land near Skokie Boulevard and Hibbard for a playground. However, it was subsequently decided that instead of a playground, the Park District would develop the site as an open-space nature center. The site was incrementally developed before being officially dedicated in 1981 as the Stephen R. Keay Nature Learning Center. The Green Bay Trail opened in 1981.

In October 1991 construction began on a new structure for the Linden Station. The new Linden Station opened in 1993, with the former station being preserved as a retail space and a local historical landmark.

In 1974, the village gave a contract to the firm OTR to design and operate a bus service for Wilmette, in view of the bankruptcy of the privately owned Glenview Bus Company. The service was named by a contest as Wilmette Wilbus, and it began in March 1974. Drivers and maintenance staff were Village employees. Ridership grew as service quality was high, and the routes served the train stations, the high schools and the shopping area. In 1995 Pace took over the operations for Wilmette's bus routes, bringing an end to the village's Wilbus service.

In 1994 the board of Wilmette Public Schools District 39 voted to reopen Highcrest Middle School. This forced the Wilmette Park District to find new quarters. The Park District bought the former Bell Elementary School building, which had been developed for use as offices, and converted it into their new home. After significant renovations, the 95,000 square foot Community Recreation Center was opened in October 1995. Parts of the center were dedicated for use by the Early Childhood Center and Meskill Senior Center (the hub of the village's programs for those aged fifty and older), creating spaces dedicated to serving some of both Wilmette's youngest and oldest residents. Other portions of the building housed the Center Fitness Club and a brand-new gymnastics facility. An athletic gymnasium was added to Community Recreation Center 1996 and an auditorium (funded in part by a $720,000 grant from the state) was added to the Community Recreation Center in 1998. The Auditorium is now home to The North Shore Theater of Wilmette and Wilmette Children's Theatre.

=== 21st century ===
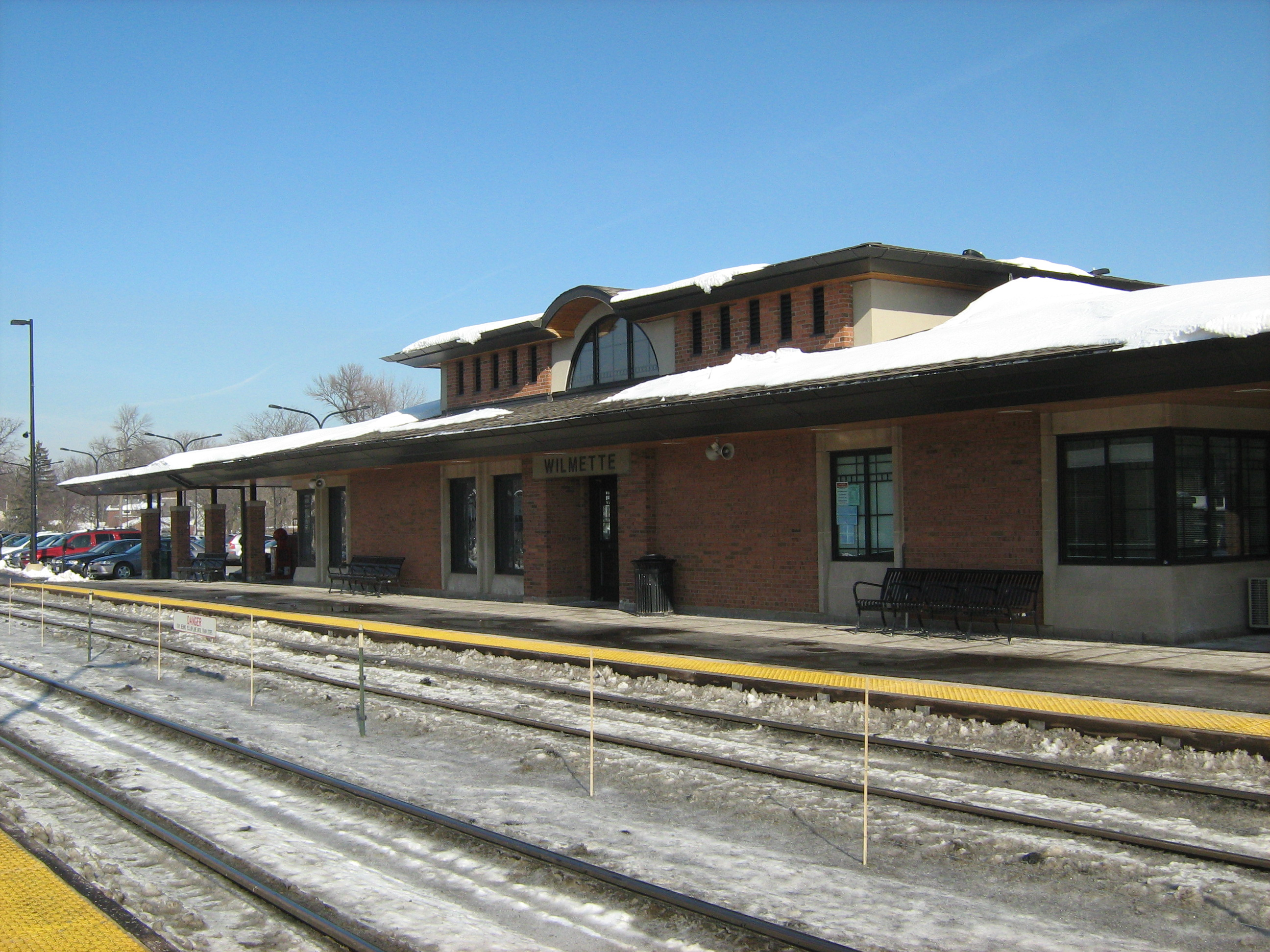
A new railway station was constructed in 2001.

November 7, 2000, residents voted in favor of spending up to $10 million in general obligation bonds to reconstruct the pools at Centennial Park. Work on replacing the 30-year-old pools began on August 12, 2001. The pools were reopened ten months later on June 8, 2002. Wilmette again rebuilt its commuter rail station in 2001.

After the September 11 attacks the Wilmette Park District established the "Reach Out Wilmette" campaign in an effort to contribute to disaster relief fundraising. Special events (including a variety show, a 5K Run, aerobics classes, and a Blood Drive) were held. The campaign ultimately raised more than $10,000 in aid funding.

On January 5, 2002, the Olympic Torch passed through downtown Wilmette on its route from Chicago to Milwaukee during the 2002 Winter Olympics torch relay.

In late 2001, a coalition of open land advocates, historic building preservationists and proponents of senior/affordable housing banded together to petition the Park District to purchase the 17-acre Mallinckrodt College property (which contained a former college building alongside 14 acres of open land). The group petitioned the village to hold a referendum on purchasing the property. Mallinckrodt property was under contract to be sold by Loyola University Chicago to a developer that intended to raze the historic 1916 structure and build a tract of single family homes. On March 19, 2002, a referendum was held, and Wilmette residents vote in favor of granting the Park District the authority to issue up to $25 million in bonds in order to purchase, improve, and maintain the Mallinckrodt College property. The village ultimately acquired the property for $20 million in September of that year. In May 2003 the Illinois Department of Natural Resources awarded the Park District a $2 million grant through the Open Land Trust program in order to preserve 5.22 acres of the property. In July 2004 a sales agreement was reached in which the Park District transferred ownership of the building to the Village of Wilmette. The village would then aim to sell the structure to a developer that would convert it into condos for senior citizens. Under the sale agreement with the developer, the Park District has retained a 7,000 square foot space on the ground floor of the building's south wing of the building, which they operate as a community recreation space named The Mallinckrodt Center. The Mallinckrodt Center contains the new home of the Meskill Senior Center.

== Geography ==
Wilmette is located on the western shore of Lake Michigan and is a near northern suburb of Chicago, immediately North of Evanston at 42°4′38″N 87°43′25″W (42.077178, -87.723736). The North Shore Channel drainage canal is supplied with water from Lake Michigan at Wilmette Harbor.

According to the 2010 census, Wilmette has a total area of 5.409 square miles (14.01 km^{2}), of which 5.4 square miles (13.99 km^{2}) (or 99.83%) is land and 0.009 square miles (0.02 km^{2}) (or 0.17%) is water.

Wilmette has a well-developed urban forest and since 1983 has enjoyed "Tree City" status. As of 2006, village parkways hosted more than 18,600 trees comprising 150 species and sub-species.

== Demographics ==
Historical population
Census	Pop.	Note	%±
1880	419		—
1890	1,458		248.0%
1900	2,300		57.8%
1910	4,943		114.9%
1920	7,814		58.1%
1930	15,233		94.9%
1940	17,226		13.1%
1950	18,162		5.4%
1960	28,268		55.6%
1970	32,134		13.7%
1980	28,229		−12.2%
1990	26,530		−6.0%
2000	27,651		4.2%
2010	27,087		−2.0%
2020	28,170		4.0%
Decennial US Census

=== Racial and ethnic composition ===
Wilmette village, Illinois – Racial and ethnic composition Note: the US Census treats Hispanic/Latino as an ethnic category. This table excludes Latinos from the racial categories and assigns them to a separate category. Hispanics/Latinos may be of any race.
Race / Ethnicity (NH = Non-Hispanic)	Pop 2000	Pop 2010	Pop 2020	% 2000	% 2010	% 2020
White alone (NH)	24,343	22,471	21,879	88.04%	82.96%	77.67%
Black or African American alone (NH)	147	208	232	0.53%	0.77%	0.82%
Native American or Alaska Native alone (NH)	6	10	12	0.02%	0.04%	0.04%
Asian alone (NH)	2,254	2,909	3,297	8.15%	10.74%	11.70%
Native Hawaiian or Pacific Islander alone (NH)	4	7	4	0.01%	0.03%	0.01%
Other race alone (NH)	44	62	123	0.16%	0.23%	0.44%
Mixed race or Multiracial (NH)	279	518	1,233	1.01%	1.91%	4.38%
Hispanic or Latino (any race)	574	902	1,390	2.08%	3.33%	4.93%
Total	27,651	27,087	28,170	100.00%	100.00%	100.00%

=== 2020 census ===
As of the 2020 census, Wilmette had a population of 28,170. There were 9,985 households and 7,480 families in the village. The median age was 44.7 years. 27.6% of residents were under the age of 18 and 20.0% of residents were 65 years of age or older. For every 100 females there were 93.8 males, and for every 100 females age 18 and over there were 89.0 males age 18 and over.

100.0% of residents lived in urban areas, while 0.0% lived in rural areas.

Of households in Wilmette, 40.3% had children under the age of 18 living in them. 68.1% were married-couple households, 9.7% were households with a male householder and no spouse or partner present, and 20.7% were households with a female householder and no spouse or partner present. About 20.5% of all households were made up of individuals and 13.5% had someone living alone who was 65 years of age or older.

There were 10,525 housing units, of which 5.1% were vacant. The homeowner vacancy rate was 1.3% and the rental vacancy rate was 5.7%.

=== Demographic estimates ===
An estimate reported that 26.74% of households were non-families. It also reported an average household size of 3.19 and an average family size of 2.64.

The estimate's age distribution included 3.8% of residents from 18 to 24, 15.1% from 25 to 44, and 32.2% from 45 to 64.

=== Income and poverty ===
The median income for a household in the village was $161,765, and the median income for a family was $206,483. Males had a median income of $127,712 versus $67,266 for females. The per capita income for the village was $96,523. About 2.5% of families and 3.3% of the population were below the poverty line, including 1.9% of those under age 18 and 4.2% of those age 65 or over.

== Arts and culture ==
=== Attractions ===
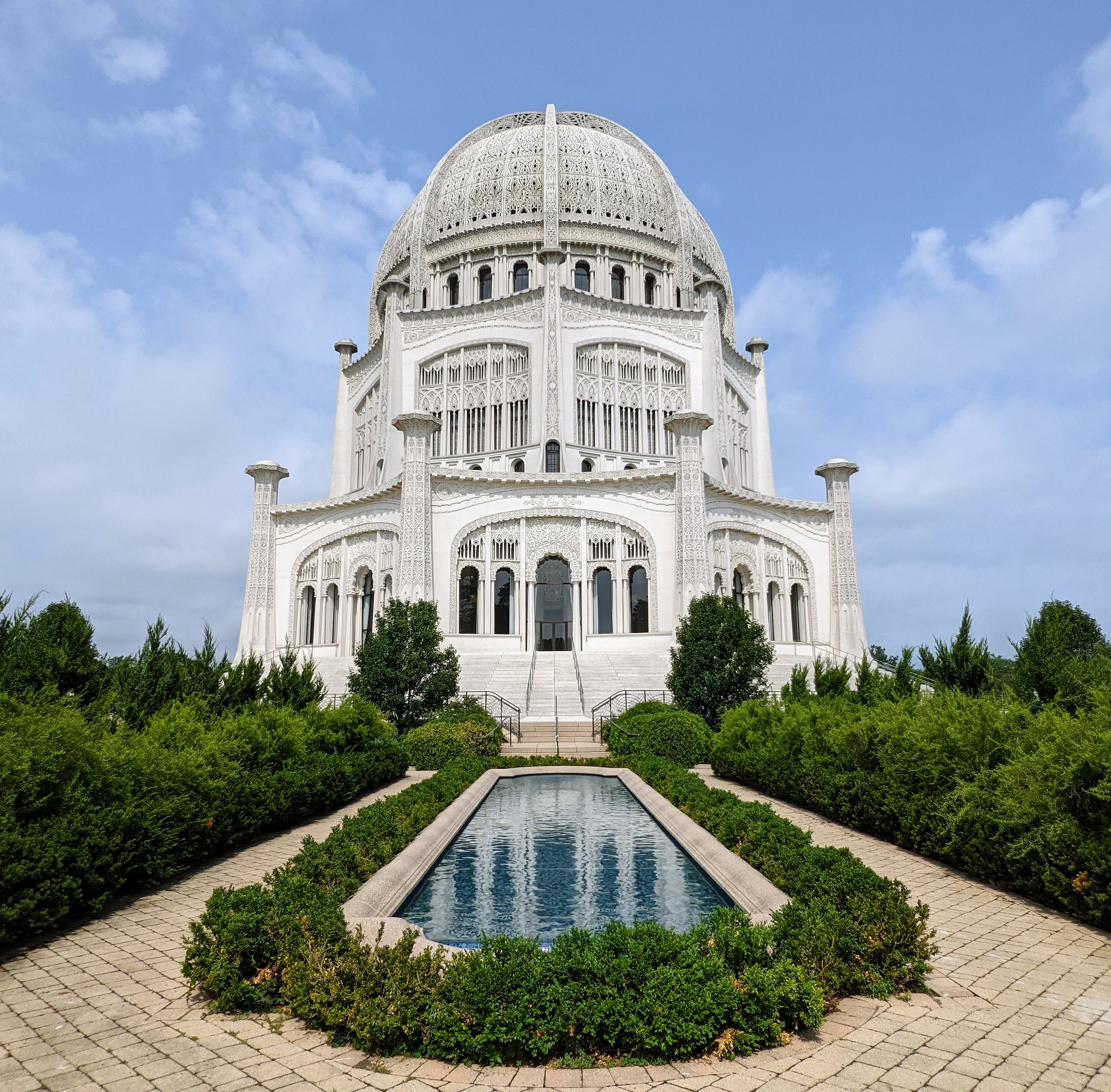
North American Baháʼí House of Worship

Wilmette is home to the Bahá'í House of Worship, the continental Bahá'í House of Worship for North America and presently the only one in the United States, as well as the administrative offices for the Bahá'í National Spiritual Assembly. In 2007 the structure was named as one of the "Seven Wonders of Illinois" by the Illinois Bureau of Tourism. It is open seven days a week and is free.

Wilmette Theater is a two-screen multiplex located on Central Avenue in one of its downtowns. The theater shows classic films, contemporary movies, as well as hosting live performances.

Wilmette has several shopping centers. Plaza del Lago, one of the nation's oldest shopping centers, is located along the Lake Michigan shoreline on Sheridan Road. Edens Plaza and Westlake Plaza are on Lake Avenue east of the Edens Expressway.

=== Architecture ===
In addition to the Bahá'í House of Worship, Wilmette is famous for several other examples of religious architecture. The oldest existing church building in Wilmette is the First Congregational Church (1909) designed in the Tudor Revival style. Trinity United Methodist Church (1928) is a Neo-Gothic structure and was designed and constructed by Granger & Bollenbacher of Wisconsin Lannonstone. The church features stained glass windows by Willet Studios of Philadelphia, among the top American studios during the 1920s. The church was used as a filming location for Home Alone.

Both St. Joseph and St. Francis Xavier Church were designed by the firm of McCarthy, Smith and Eppig. St. Joseph's is Wilmette's oldest religious congregation, established in 1843. The present building (1939) is among the finest examples of Art Deco architecture on the North Shore. The interior is particularly well preserved and features Art Deco light fixtures and stained glass windows designed and fabricated by Giannini & Hilgart of Chicago. The altar floor and sanctuary wall contain Italian and French marble inlaid with Portuguese onyx. The Stations of the Cross are pastel-hued mosaics crafted in the Vatican Studio of Mosaics in Rome. The design and materials of the Y-shaped school designed by Herman J. Gaul of Chicago and constructed in 1934, and the adjacent rectory, harmonize with the church. St. Francis Xavier Church (1939) was designed in the Late Gothic Revival mode while McCarthy, Smith & Eppig were simultaneously working on St. Joseph's. The stained glass windows were made with English and German imported glass by the famed F. X. Zettler Studios of Munich and New York City. St Francis Xavier School (1924), just east of the church, is a unique modern blend of Gothic architecture by Chicago architect Barry Byrne.

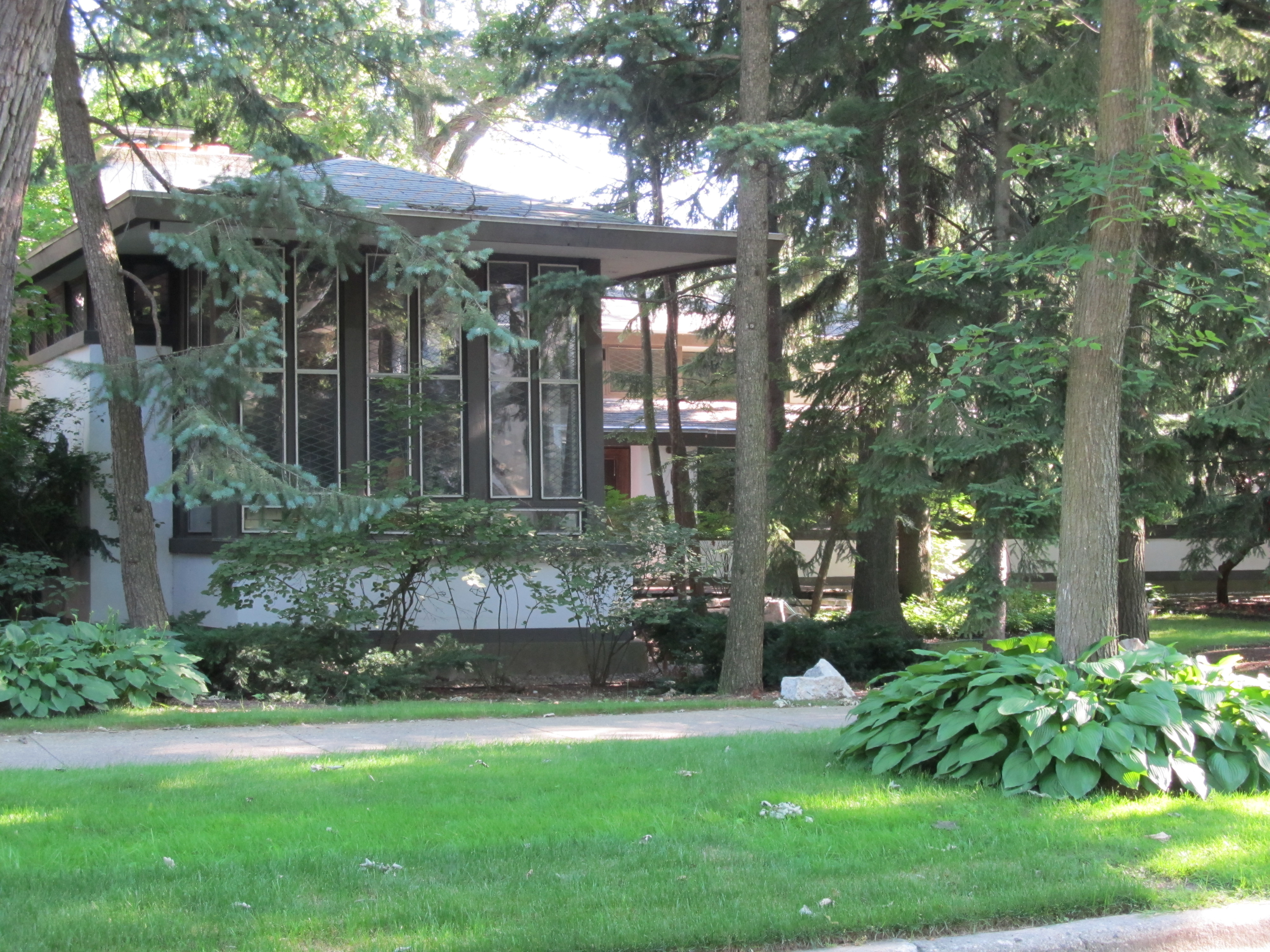
Frank J. Baker House

Wilmette has two houses built by Frank Lloyd Wright: the Frank J. Baker House (and carriage house) and the Lewis Burleigh House (also known as the JJ O'Connor House). In addition, Wilmette has homes designed by Wright's contemporaries in the field of Prairie School architecture, including John S. Van Bergen.

=== Historic preservation ===
These places in Wilmette are on the National Register of Historic Places:

Site	Address	Listed
Baha'i Temple	100 Linden Ave.	1978
Bailey–Michelet House	1028 Sheridan Rd.	1982
Frank J. Baker House	507 Lake Ave.	1974
Alfred Bersbach House	1120 Michigan Ave.	2003
Chicago and Northwestern Depot	1135-1141 Wilmette Ave.	1975
Gross Point Village Hall	609 Ridge Rd.	1991
Linden Purple Line Terminal	349 Linden Ave.	1984
Oak Circle Historic District	318-351 Oak Circle	2001
Ouilmette North Historic District	46 blocks: Chesnut Ave, Sheridan Rd., Lake Ave. and 13th St.	2005

=== Library ===
The Wilmette Public Library provides educational support to students at all grade levels, including those residing in neighboring Kenilworth.

== Sports and recreation ==
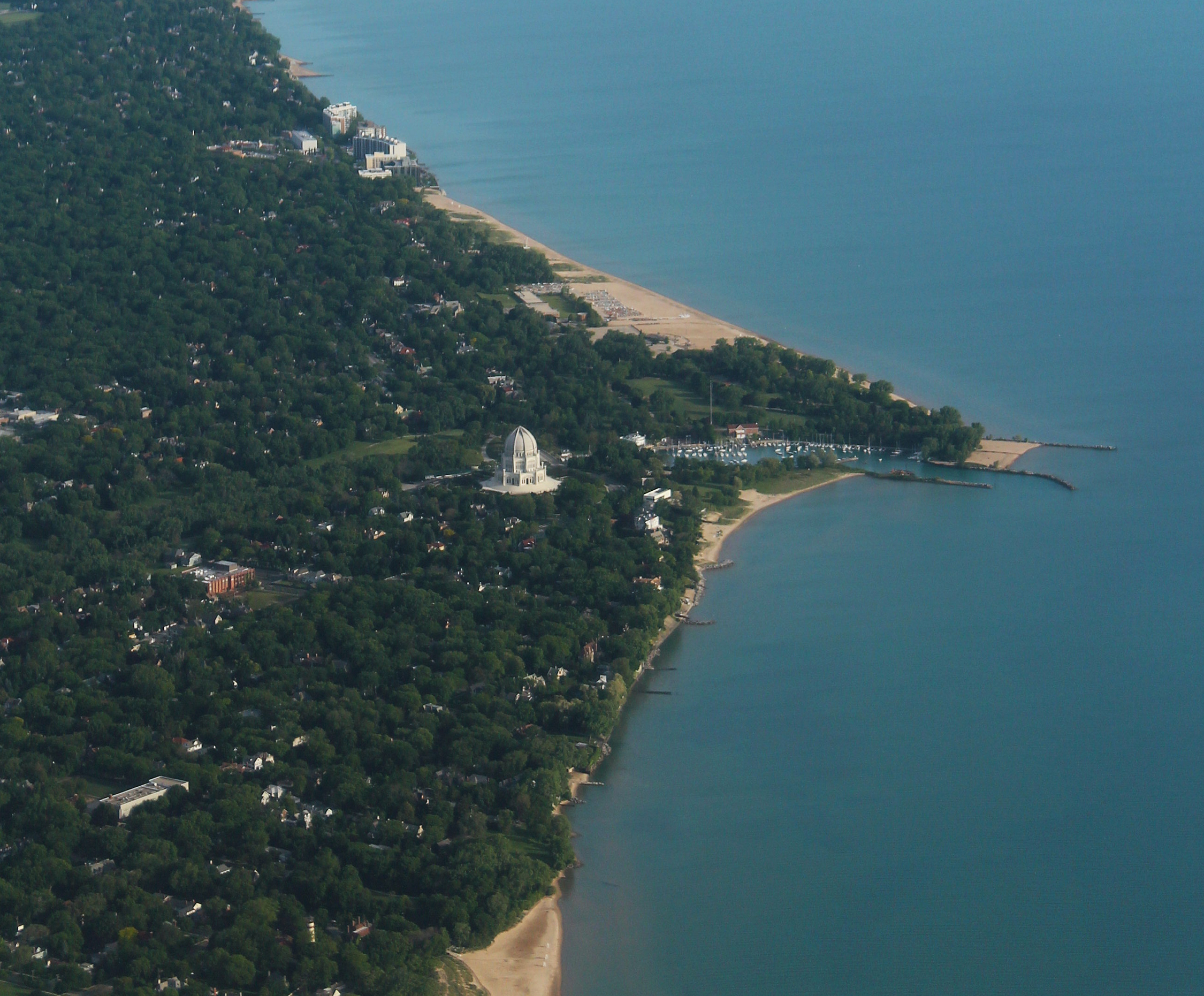
Aerial view of Gillson Park

The Wilmette Park District oversees over 300 acres of parks and open land including Gillson Park and Beaches; Keay Nature Center; the Community Playfield, Mallinckrodt Park and a portion of the Green Bay Bike Trail. Five facilities including the Lakeview Center; Centennial Recreation Complex; the Community Recreation Center; the Wilmette Golf Club and the Mallinckrodt Center house Park District programs and activities. Neighborhood parks can be found in 15 additional locations throughout the village. A wide range of recreation programming encompasses children and adults from four months old to seniors.

The Wilmette Park District's Community Recreation Center has a 10,000-sq ft gymnastics facility. In 2013 the Wilmette Platform Tennis Club was opened. The Wilmette Platform Tennis Club has four paddle tennis courts and a warming hut.

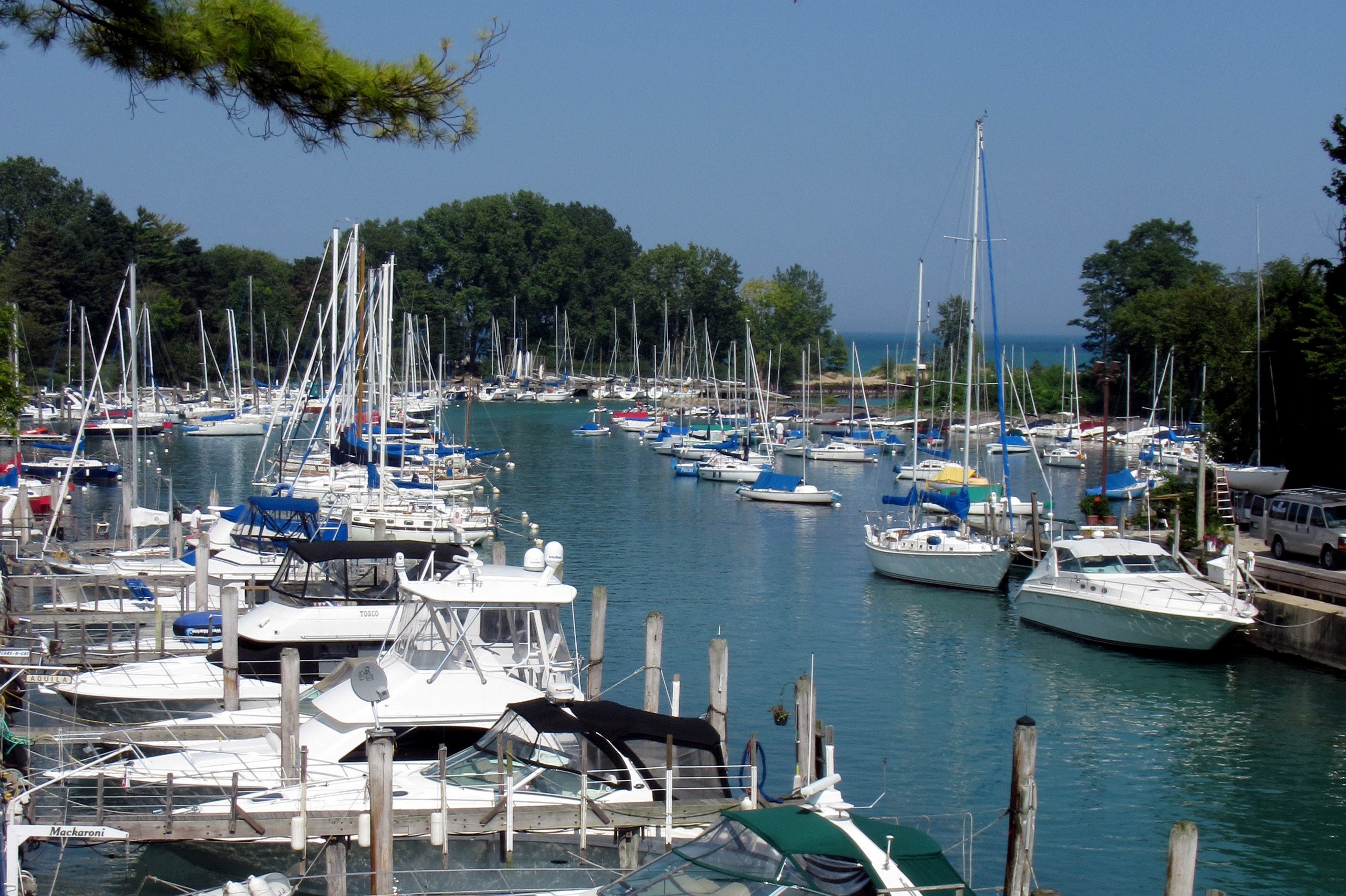
Wilmette Harbor

The North Shore Channel Trail also passes through the village.

=== Beaches ===
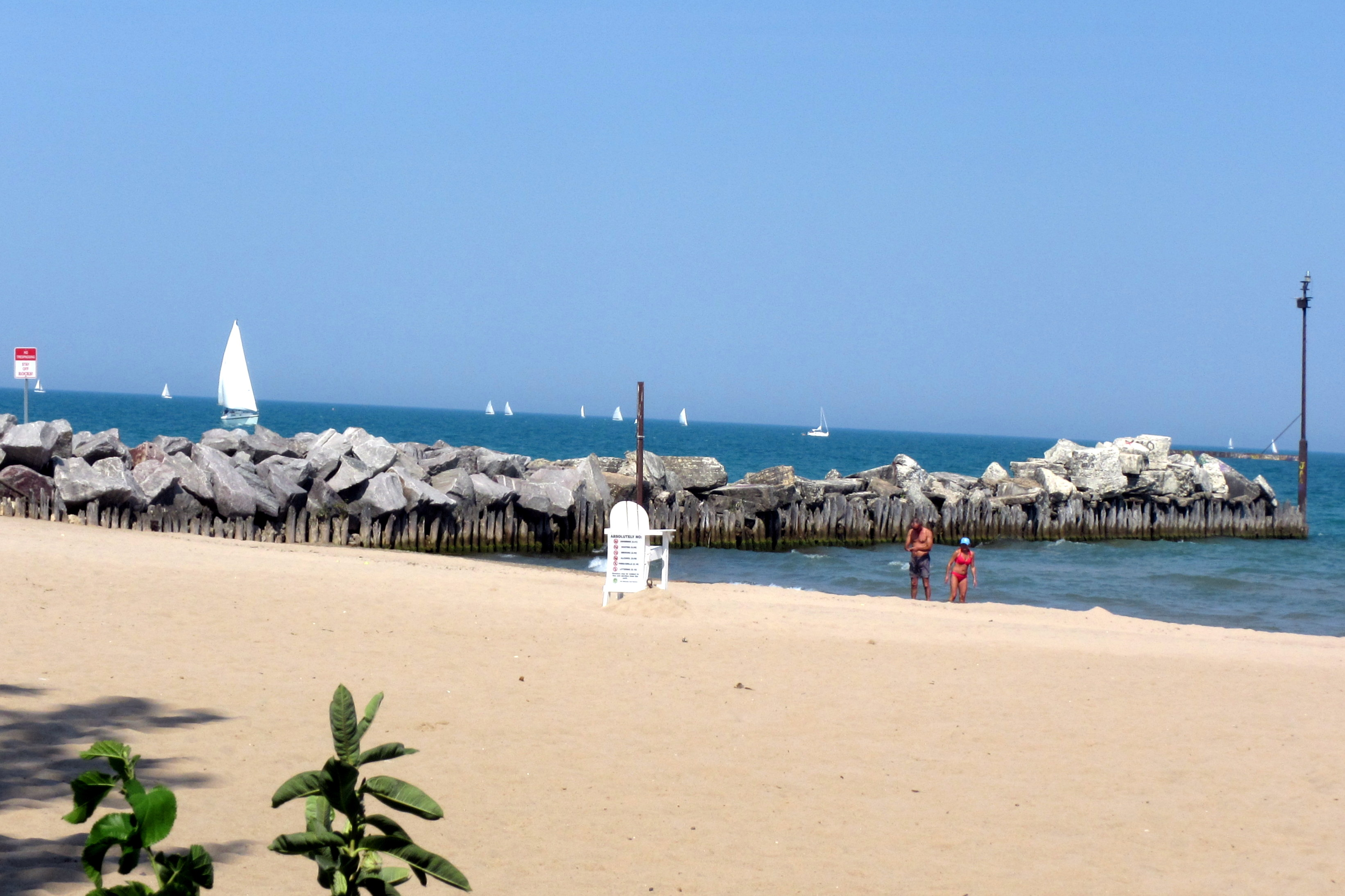
Beach at Wilmette's Gilson Park

Wilmette contains three public beaches, a large one at the 60 acre Gilson Park and two smaller ones at Langdon Park and the Elmwood Dunes Preserve. The beaches have been a local family attraction for decades. Swimming is allowed only in specific areas. The park also provides a dog beach which is located south of the main public beach area. Depending on weather conditions, the park's beaches may be temporarily closed in order to maintain the safety of the park's visitors. Gilson Park also hosts a public theater, the Wallace Bowl, which provides a variety of performances throughout the summer. Tennis courts are open from sunrise to after sunset, and there is space for people to play beach volleyball and soccer. Gillson Park also has a marina (Wilmette Harbor) and built-in grills for barbecuing located throughout the park.

=== Centennial Park ===
Wilmette's Centennial Park contains a public swimming pool, tennis and indoor ice-skating facilities. The park's ice-skating center (Centennial Ice Center) is a member of the United States Figure Skating Association and the Ice Skating Institute (ISI). The Ice Center is home to ISI class programs instructing over 3,000 skaters a year and ISI hockey classes instructing over 500 skaters a year. It is used by the Wilmette Hockey Association, Wilmette Tribe Hockey Club, New Trier High School Hockey Club, Loyola Academy Hockey Club, and Loyola University Hockey Club, the Wilmette Cougars Women's Hockey Club, Tom McDaniels Adult Hockey Hockey North America Adult Hockey, the Loyola Academy Thanksgiving High School Hockey Invitational Tournament, and a "Mid-Summer Classic" ISI Competition. The Wilmette Tennis Club features eight indoor tennis courts at Centennial Park.

=== Curling ===
The 1972 United States Men's Curling Championship was held in Wilmette. The event served as a qualifier to decide which team would represent United States the 1972 World Curling Championships.

The Wilmette Curling Club won the 1985 United States Men's Curling Championship. The club represented the United States at the 1985 men's World Curling Championships where they ultimately tied with Denmark to place 3rd overall.

=== Golf ===
The village is home to Wilmette Golf Course, designed by Joe Roseman, which is open to the public. The golf course is a facility of the Wilmette Park District. The village is also home to a private golf course at Westmoreland Country Club, established in 1911. The Canal Shores Golf Course straddles the border of Wilmette and Evanston.

== Government ==
Wilmette is governed by a village board composed of a Village President and six Trustees. The Village operates under the Council-Manager form of government. The current Village President, Senta Plunkett, began her second consecutive term in May 2025 and will be barred from serving beyond May 2029. Trustees serve four-year terms that are staggered and they are elected at large. Half of the Trustees are up for reelection every two years. Elections for both Trustees and the Village President are held every two years in April proceeding major federal elections.

Residents have the opportunity to witness board meetings in-person at Village Hall or on Channel 6.

In 2004, Wilmette was one of the first localities in Illinois to enact a ban on smoking in all public spaces, including bars and restaurants. Also that year, the village government prosecuted a local resident for violating the town's handgun ban when he shot a burglar inside his house. The handgun ban was enacted in direct response to an incident in 1988 when Laurie Dann opened fire on a classroom full of children in neighboring Winnetka; it was repealed in 2008 after the U.S. Supreme Court struck down a similar ban in Washington, D.C.

Senta Plunkett was first elected as village president in 2021 and is currently serving her second term until 2029.

== Education ==
For grade school education, Wilmette is served by Wilmette Public Schools District 39 which includes elementary schools (grades K–4) Central, Harper, McKenzie, and Romona, Highcrest Middle School (grades 5 and 6), and Wilmette Junior High School (grades 7 and 8). Central Elementary School and Romona Elementary School were recipients of the National Blue Ribbon award bestowed by the U.S. Department of Education. Marie Murphy School, also located in Wilmette, is part of Avoca School District 37. It has the longest school day in the state of Illinois.

Saints JFX School, St. Francis Xavier Campus (K-8) is a parochial elementary school in the area. Other private schools in Wilmette include the Ronald Knox Montessori School (Pre-K to K) and Baker Demonstration School (Pre-K to 8).

For public secondary or high school education, serving grades 9 to 12, Wilmette students attend New Trier High School. High school freshmen attend classes at the Northfield campus while other grades attend the Winnetka campus. Wilmette is also home to Catholic high schools Loyola Academy and Regina Dominican High School.

In 2006, National Louis University closed its former main site, which had 6.5 acres (2.6 ha) of land, with about 66% in Wilmette and the remainder in Evanston.

== Infrastructure ==
=== Transportation ===
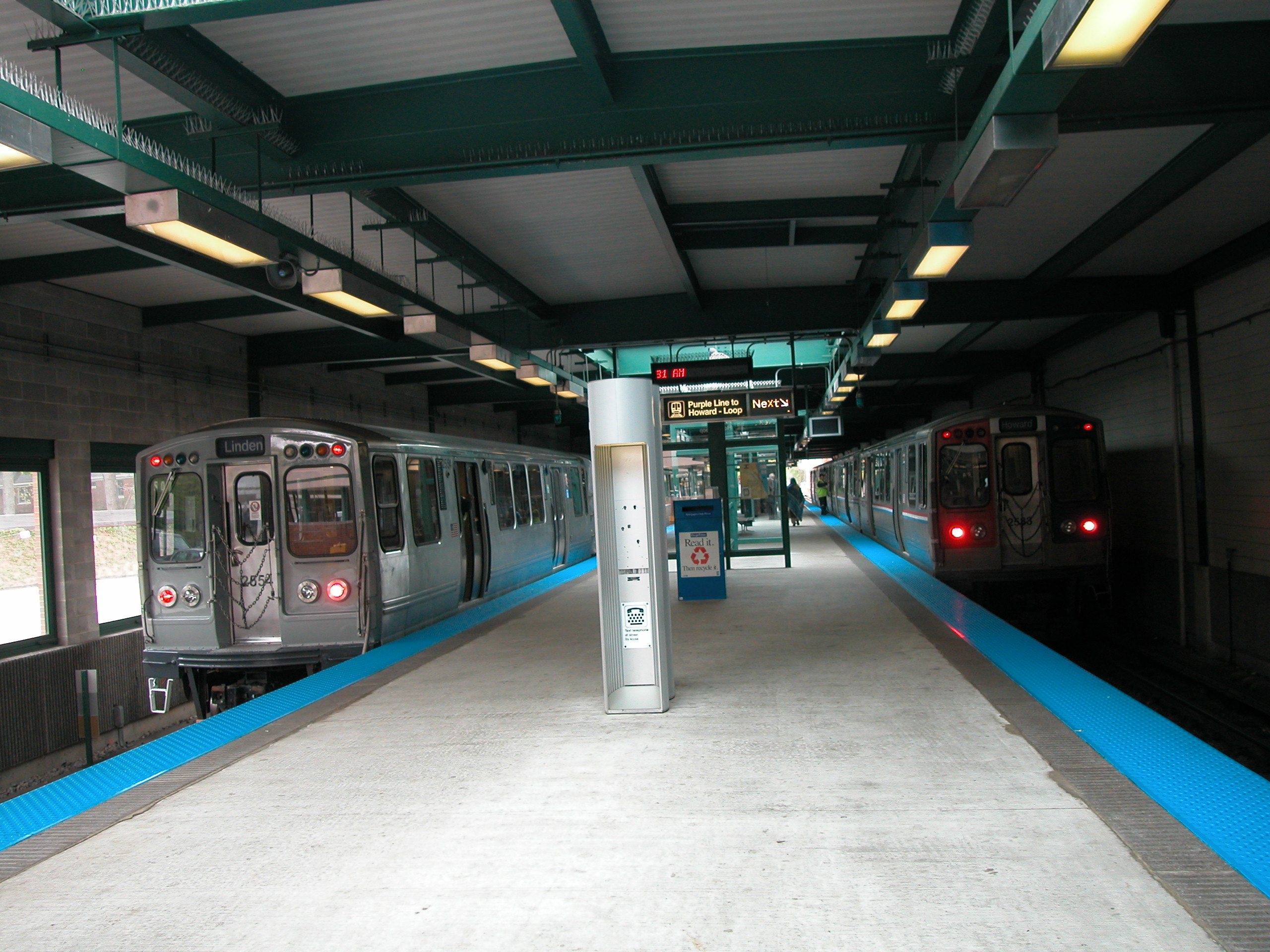
Linden Avenue 'L' Station

Wilmette is currently served by the Chicago Transit Authority's Purple Line, the Metra commuter trains operated by Union Pacific Railroad on the old Chicago and North Western Railway line, and by the Pace Suburban Bus system. The northernmost station of the Purple Line is located at Linden Avenue in Wilmette. Wilmette's commuter railroad station is at Green Bay Road between Central and Lake Avenues.

The North Shore Line served Wilmette from 1899 until 1955.

Wilmette ran its own local bus service for 20 years, 1974 to 1994, Wilmette Wilbus, until Pace took over the 3 routes and the bus fleet in January 1995. Routes 421, 422, 423 and the 213 continue to serve Wilmette destinations, including the rail stations, shopping centers and high schools.

=== Sustainability ===
The village of Wilmette has a stated commitment to "promoting and creating a more sustainable environment through energy efficiency, improved stormwater management, water conservation, pollution reduction, and recycling." Wilmette and 11 other communities are competing in the ComEd Community Energy Challenge for a $100,000 prize for energy consumption reduction. The village has implemented some lighting and heating efficiency programs in some municipal buildings. Each year since 2010, the village partners with Go Green Wilmette to present Going Green Matters: Wilmette's Green Fair, a sustainable living and recycling event that attracts over 1,000 residents, exhibitors, vendors, and activists.

== Sister cities ==
Wilmette's sister city in Australia is Mona Vale in Northern Beaches, New South Wales and in Japan is Neyagawa in Osaka Prefecture.
