= Avoca School District 37 =

School district in Cook County, Illinois, USA

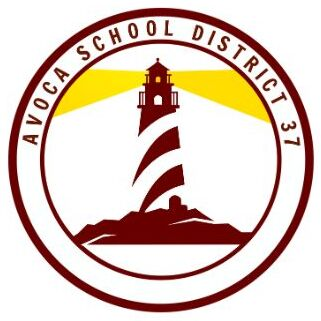

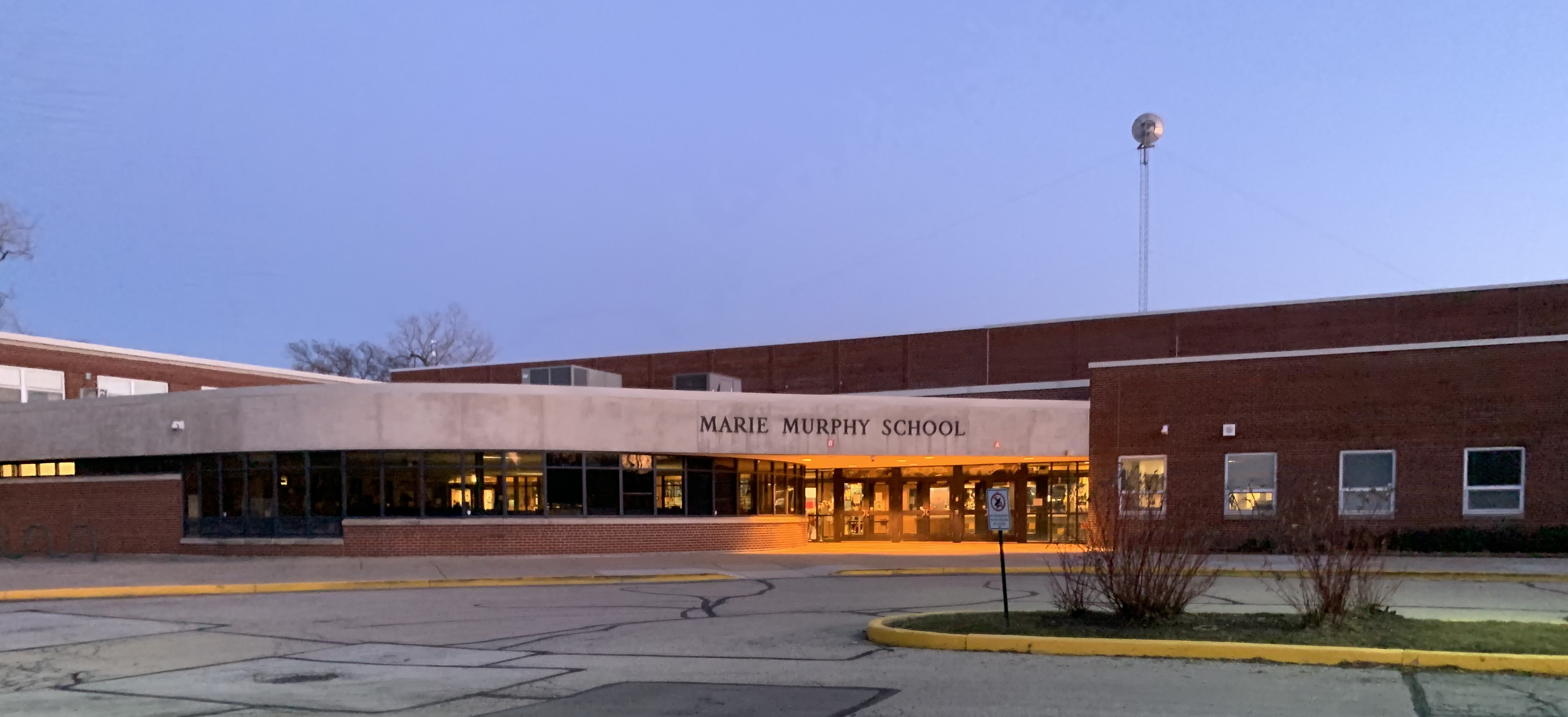
- District 37 Offices and Maire Murphy School, Wilmette, Illinois

Address
- 2921 Illinois Road Wilmette, Illinois, 60091; United States

District information
- Type: Public
- Motto: Inspire curiosity, cultivate academic growth, and nurture diversity
- Grades: PreK–8
- Superintendent: Dr. Sandra Arreguín
- Schools: Avoca West Elementary (Glenview); Maire Murphy School (Wilmette)
- NCES District ID: 1704800

Students and staff
- Students: 704
- District mascot: Viking
- Colors: Maroon; Gold

Other information
- Website: avoca37.org

Avoca School District 37 is a school district in the Chicago metropolitan area. Its headquarters are in Marie Murphy School in Wilmette, which has middle school and preschool levels. It also operates Avoca West School, with elementary grades, in Glenview. In addition to portions of Glenview and Wilmette, it serves portions of Northfield, Winnetka, and some unincorporated areas with Winnetka postal addresses. It feeds into New Trier Township High School District 203. The name "Avoca", meaning "Fountain of Knowledge", is a Gaelic word.

== Leadership ==
Avoca District 37 is currently led by Superintendent Dr. Sandra Arreguín. She is the second female superintendent of the district following Mrs. Maire Murphy, a beloved teacher and administrator of 36 years.

Superintendent	Years
Sandra Arreguín	2024–present
Kaine Osburn	2019-2024
Kevin Jauch	2011-2019
Joseph Porto	2002-2011
John Sloan	1986-2002
Alfred Price	1968-1986

== History ==
The district was established in 1870. It used a wood building until the construction of a brick one in 1923. The former wood building was moved and turned into residences located in Northfield.

== Schools ==
Avoca West Elementary School in Glenview was constructed in 1959.

The current Murphy School building, named after former superintendent Marie J. Murphy (died 1999), opened in 1992. Prior to 1968 it was known as Avoca Junior High School, and was previously the Avoca School. Its previous 1923 structure, two stories, was made with brick. It was a two-room facility until it was expanded to four rooms in 1930.

Avoca Center was located in the former Avoca East Elementary School in Wilmette, which was built in 1957. It received six additional classrooms in 1961. Avoca Center was torn down in 2019 for the construction of soccer fields. Avoca Center was located on the same campus as Maire Murphy School, separated by a parking lot.

Since 2019, Avoca has had two schools, Avoca West Elementary and Maire Murphy School. While debate during the 2023–2024 school year arose about the termination of Avoca West Elementary and the formation of a new pre-k through 8th grade building where Maire Murphy School sits, the plan was scrapped for a referendum that moved Avoca West to the vacant piece of land where Avoca Center once stood. The referendum, which was cited to cost close to $90 million failed to pass by a margin of 1,061 votes out of 2,105 cast. Residents cited an increase in taxes and a disapproval with the sale of the negative impact to property values near Avoca West.

== Recognition ==
Avoca School District 37 has been known throughout its history of having core strengths in the areas of musical and scientific education. Notably, District 37 offers string programs to students starting in first grade. The music program in District 37 has received the Best Communities for Music Education (BCME) award in 2019, 2022, and 2023.

Maire Murphy School is known for its nationally renowned Science Olympiad team. The team consistently places at the Illinois State-wide Competition every year, and they often place within the top 10 teams at Nationals. In 2012, Maire Murphy took second place in nationals, its highest placement in the programs history. The accomplishment earned the school recognition from former Senator Mark Kirk.

(Maire Murphy orchestra students playing for staff and students walking into the building)

== Services ==
As per the Wilmette Community Special Education Agreement (WCSEA), Avoca sends students with severe disabilities to Wilmette School District 39. The Avoca district used the Northern Suburban Special Education District (now known as TrueNorth Educational Cooperative 804) until 2008, when it switched to the Wilmette district to save money.
