= Frank J. Baker House =

Historic house in Wilmette, Illinois

- U.S. National Register of Historic Places
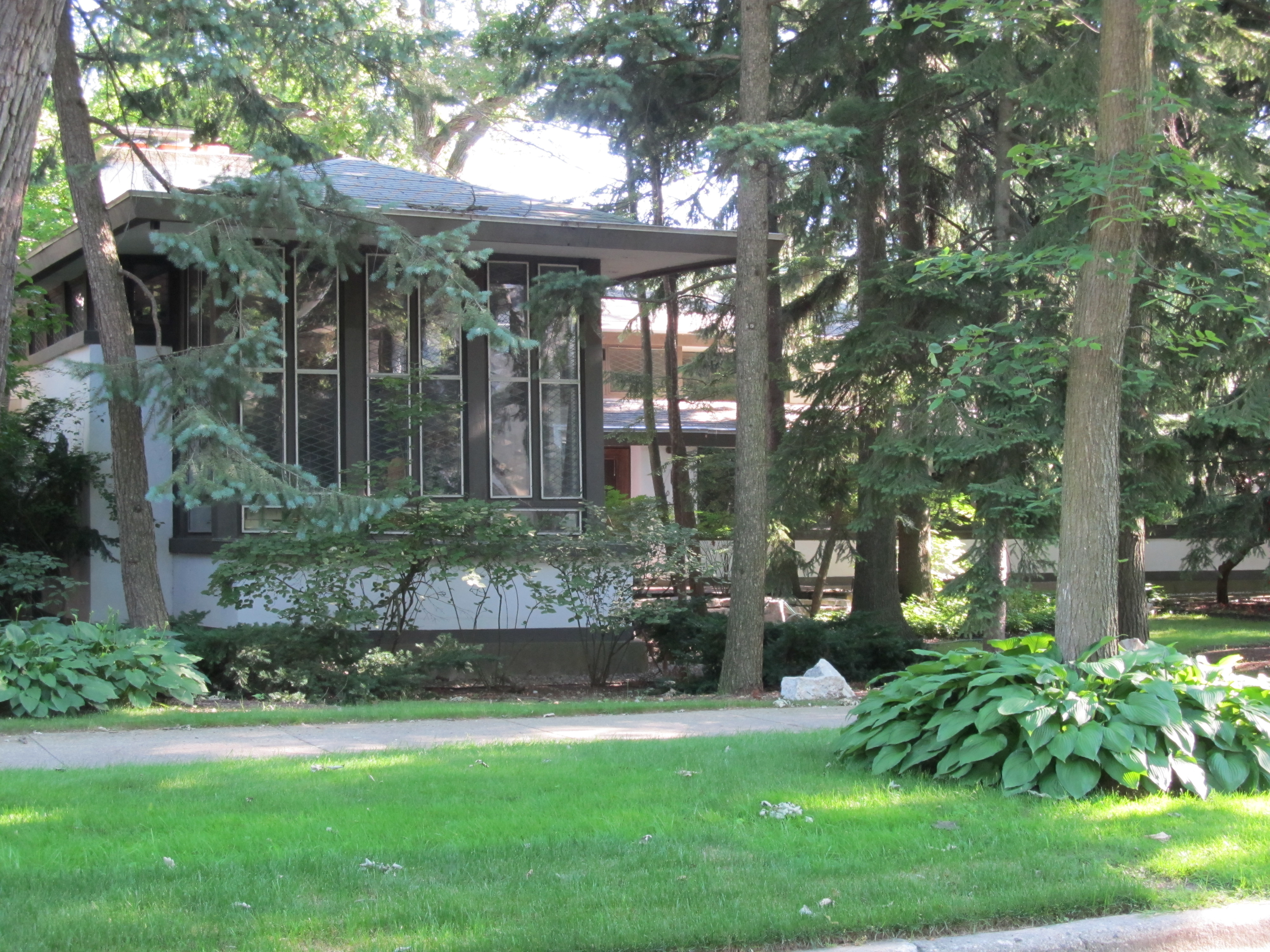

- Location within Illinois Location within the United States
- Location: Wilmette, Illinois
- Coordinates: 42°4′42″N 87°41′40″W
- Built: 1909
- Architect: Frank Lloyd Wright
- Architectural style: Prairie School
- NRHP reference No.: 74000759
- Added to NRHP: November 8, 1974

The Frank J. Baker House is a 4,800-square-foot Prairie School style house located at 507 Lake Avenue in Wilmette, Illinois. The house, which was designed by Frank Lloyd Wright, was built in 1909, and features five bedrooms, three and a half bathrooms, and three fireplaces. At this point in his career, Wright was experimenting with two-story construction and the T-shaped floor plan. This building was part of a series of T-shaped floor planned buildings designed by Wright, similar in design to Wright's Isabel Roberts House. This home also perfectly embodies Wright's use of the Prairie Style through the use of strong horizontal orientation, a low hanging roof, and deeply expressed overhangs. The house's two-story living room features a brick fireplace, a sloped ceiling, and leaded glass windows along the north wall; it is one of the few remaining two-story interiors with the T-shaped floor plan designed by Wright.

The house was listed on the National Register of Historic Places on November 8, 1974. A major restoration of the home was begun in 2020 under new ownership.

== Interior ==
Once through the entryway of the home, the twenty-two foot long dining room featuring diamond leaded-glass windows, pitched ceiling and wooden trim is revealed. Past the dining room on the main floor is a large kitchen complete with a small breakfast nook. The living room bears a dramatic resemblance to a Catholic cathedral that features a ceiling that cantilevers into a loft above. The heavy use of horizontal and vertical windows that stretch around the outside of the room give one the impression of more space. At the heart of the home can be found the main brick fireplace, a common theme within Wright's work, with a balcony above for viewing. The upstairs master bedroom features one of three fireplaces along with a personal enclosed balcony.

== See also ==
- List of Frank Lloyd Wright works
