= Wilmette Wilbus =

Local transit bus service operated by village of Wilmette, Illinois

Wilbus
- Commenced operation: March 18, 1974
- Ceased operation: January 7, 1995
- Locale: Wilmette, Illinois
- Service area: Wilmette and Old Orchard Shopping Center
- Service type: Local bus
- Routes: 3
- Depots: 1
- Fleet: 18 buses
- Daily ridership: 4,800
- Operator: Village of Wilmette, Illinois
- General Manager: Bob Bourne; Don McIntyre; Will Heelan

Wilbus was a municipal bus service provided by the village of Wilmette, Illinois, from 1974 to 1995. Its motto was "Home of the World's Friendliest Bus Drivers". It was created by the village board after the bankruptcy of the privately owned Glenview Bus Company. It operated as a division of Wilmette Public Works until January 7, 1995, when it was absorbed into Pace, the suburban bus division of the Regional Transit Authority (RTA).

== Glenview Bus Company ==
Glenview Bus Company (GBC) was created by Ray Nehmzow, a school bus driver in Wilmette, Illinois. GBC began operations on December 11, 1939. Its primary purpose was to assist in the development of the residential areas of Wilmette and Glenview and to transport schoolchildren. GBC had grown to a six-route system by the 1960s. GBC provided connections to Chicago & Northwestern (C&NW) commuter trains in Wilmette and Evanston and to the Chicago Transit Authority (CTA) "L" train at Linden Avenue and Davis Street in Evanston. It was profitable through the late 1960s and carried 547,000 passengers in 1968 alone.

GBC struggled through 1973 and early 1974. The garage at 943 Washington Street in Glenview was closed, and operations moved to Henkels & Lechtenberg Bus Co. on Waukegan Road in Northbrook. Federal and state funding was not available at that time for operating expenses. Joby Berman, a Wilmette resident who served as the director of the transit division of the Illinois Department of Transportation (IDOT), was actively involved in the efforts to continue bus service by GBC. IDOT provided ten retired buses from Evanston Bus Company, ten from West Towns Bus Company, and some from South Suburban Safeway Lines.

GBC declared bankruptcy on February 12, 1974, although a few drivers continued to operate buses until February 16. United Motor Coach, subsidized by North Suburban Mass Transit District, began emergency service between Golf Mill Shopping Center and Linden CTA on February 18, 1974. Eight trips were operated each weekday.

Bob Bourne and Jay Allison, who were undergraduate students in Mechanical Engineering at Northwestern University, were hired by GBC in March 1971, as part-time drivers and drove all the routes and schedules. Both graduated in 1972; Bourne began a career at the CTA, while Allison joined Northwestern's graduate program in civil engineering (transportation), where he met Dave Spacek and Jim Stoner. Allison also continued to work part time at GBC. These four formed a consulting firm with a plan for new bus routes.

== Creation of Wilbus ==
Wilmette was aware of the deteriorating GBC service and had created a study committee in 1973 that had developed contingency plans for its bankruptcy. Armon Lund, the village manager, and Dave Leach, the director of administrative services, completed the study on December 4, 1973, and provided recommendations on equipment, fares, and schedules.

Allison, Bourne, Spacek, and Stoner then created OTR Management Company, and proposed bus service that would focus on local trips, operating only in Wilmette and to Old Orchard Shopping Center in Skokie. Route 1 would operate between Edens Plaza and Linden CTA via Glenview Road. Route 2 would operate from Linden to Edens Plaza via Lake Street, then to Old Orchard Shopping Center. Both routes used Central Avenue between downtown Wilmette and Linden CTA. Route 3 would connect Plaza del Lago and Linden CTA. The initial three-route system required four buses. Schedules were designed to meet several C&NW commuter trains in the morning and afternoon. The routes continued to the Linden CTA station to serve Wilmette residents using the CTA. It also served the reverse commuters from Chicago and Evanston who worked in Wilmette. Service operated from 6:27 a.m. to 7:14 p.m. on weekdays and from 6:32 a.m. to 6:40 p.m. on Saturdays.

The North Suburban Mass Transit District rerouted its two emergency routes to connect Glenview with Old Orchard and Evanston and increased the number of trips from seven per day to 11 per day.

Jay Allison told drivers that “Your job is not to drive a bus up and down a street – your job is to get people where they want to go.” Will Heelan expanded the philosophy to “We move people, not buses.” As is typical in small bus operations, drivers got to know their passengers well. Minor detours for passengers with many packages or shopping bags were common. Drivers waited for passengers running to bus stops, made mid-block stops safely to let passengers off closer to their homes, and waited for passengers from late trains.

Drivers were allowed to express their personality if they drove safely and stayed reasonably close to schedule. Some had their dogs with them while driving. Many of the part-time drivers had other careers.

== Route history ==
The initial three-route system operated with a few minor route changes until 1977. Route 3 service was expanded to Winnetka, and Route 1 was also expanded to Loyola Academy, New Trier West, and downtown Northfield on May 2, 1977. Sunday service on Route 2 began on November 12, 1978. On August 25, 1986, Route 421 was extended into Glenview. Alternate trips on Route 421 went to Northfield or Glenview. 45 round trips were provided each weekday, with rush hour service operating at 10- to 15-minute intervals.

== Ridership history ==
Service began on March 18, 1974, and was immediately successful. 452 people rode on the first day and 662 on the second day. 4,001 passengers rode the buses in the second week of service. Within three months, ridership had increased to 5,500 passengers per week and by its second anniversary in 1975, the system was carrying 8,500 passengers per week.

It was often the most productive suburban bus system in the RTA service area. Its primary markets were commuters traveling to the C&NW trains in downtown and CTA at Linden Avenue; reverse commuters coming from Chicago and Evanston to work in homes and businesses in Wilmette; high school students at Regina, New Trier West, and Loyola Academy; and Wilmette residents traveling to downtown businesses and the Edens Plaza and Old Orchard shopping centers.

Wilbus ridership, 1974–1990
Year	Riders
1974	234,575
1975	400,777
1976	481,574
1977	573,182
1978	770,322
1979	968,132
1980	1,106,885
1981	1,090,388
1982	1,162,142
1983	1,222,892
1984	1,249,208
1985	1,199,113
1986	1,079,154
1987	967,342
1988	916,938
1989	893,578
1990	864,235

Pace came into existence when Wilbus was at its peak ridership; the Chicago region was making changes in subsidy sources, and in how it viewed suburban bus service. Pace passed subsidies to Wilmette for Wilbus; it also imposed a few requirements in return, including higher fares. Some of those changes contributed to ridership declines in the second decade of Wilbus operations.

The service was focused on local travel; connections with NORTRAN (later Pace) regional services and C&NW (later Metra) commuter trains were available. Connection to the CTA's rapid transit system was available at Linden station. Village officials estimated that Wilbus eliminated the need for at least 200 parking spaces at the C&NW station.

== Takeover by Pace ==
Pace, originally the Suburban Bus Authority, has been the operator of the former Wilbus routes since 1995.

Pace built a new bus garage on Oakton Avenue in Evanston in 1995 on land purchased in 1986. This garage was designed to service the routes operating in the suburbs near Evanston. The Wilbus routes, buses and employees were transferred to Pace on January 9, 1995.

Several changes to routes were made to the Wilbus system at that time of the Pace takeover because Pace had a regional route concept and minor interest in local passenger travel. The Illinois Legislature had imposed a passenger fare recovery mandate on Pace that maximized higher priced passenger fares, favoring long trips at the expense of lower priced fares for short trips. As fares went up, local ridership went down, and service frequency was gradually reduced under Pace.

In the 21st century, it has extended the original Wilbus routes, implemented new fares, and altered service frequencies. Route 421 operates only during rush hours. Route 422 operates 30 trips per day between Linden CTA and Old Orchard and continues to Northbrook 16 times per day. Route 423 operates 24 trips per day and has been extended to CTA Harlem Avenue Blue Line station. Fares are now $2.00 for adults and $1.00 for reduced-fare customers. The combined daily ridership of the three routes in 2023 was 1,216.
