= Go Green Wilmette =

Nonprofit organization in Illinois, US

- Formation: 2006; 19 years ago
- Type: Nonprofit
- Tax ID no.: 26-2212201
- Legal status: 501(c)(3)
- Headquarters: Wilmette, Illinois
- Board President: Beth Drucker
- Website: gogreenwilmette.org

Go Green Wilmette is a non-profit grassroots environmental organization in Wilmette, Illinois. It was founded in 2006 with the goal of establishing an Environmental Commission as part of the village's government. The organization's current president is Beth Drucker. Its mission is "to raise environmental awareness in Wilmette and to inspire people to take action to make a difference." The group has played an activist role in Wilmette on such issues as recycling, leaf blowers, green lawn care, and car idling, and generally acts as a clearinghouse on environmental issues in the Village and neighboring communities.

Go Green Wilmette assists local schools with environmental initiatives, such as school gardens, recycling, and composting. Go Green Wilmette also co-hosts a Greener Choices series of speakers, books, and films with the Wilmette Public Library on a variety of topics, including climate, beekeeping, sustainable agriculture, and organic vegetable gardening. The group organizes periodic educational field trips for community members. Each fall, Go Green Wilmette organizes a climate action event, urging the community to participate in what has become a global movement promoted by 350.org.

Since March 2007, Go Green Wilmette has partnered with the Village of Wilmette to host the Going Green Matters environmental fair, a sustainable living event that recycled two semi-tractor-trailers full of consumer electronics. Going Green Matters topics have included solar energy, water conservation, energy efficiency and conservation, transportation, green vehicles, sustainable agriculture, composting, home and garden, recycling, waste reduction, and reuse.
