= James O'Dea (architect) =

New Zealand architect

James O'Dea (c.1853–1930) was a New Zealand architect. O'Dea migrated to New Zealand in 1875 and initially worked as a carpenter before transitioning into architecture. O'Dea's architectural career was across the North Island but most of his work was in Wellington. Little of O'Dea's work has survived but several buildings are heritage listed with Heritage New Zealand and the Wellington City Council.

== Early life ==
James O'Dea was born c.1853 in County Clare, Ireland, United Kingdom. O'Dea was trained in carpentry and left for New Zealand aboard the Hannibal via London in 1875. O'Dea arrived in Nelson 6 August 1875 and moved to Westland.

== Career ==
In 1877 O'Dea was working as a carpenter in Reefton. O'Dea had possibly moved to Whanganui by 1880 but this is uncertain. (Note: A 'JJ O'Dea' was listed as a paperhanger in 1880) In November 1880 O'Dea was in Durban, Colony of Natal. Poor working conditions and high living costs prompted O'Dea to return to New Zealand in 1881. O'Dea likely moved to Hawera or Pātea upon his return and by 1884 he had moved to Hamilton. O'Dea did work for the Hamilton Borough Council but the relation soured and he filed an unsuccessful lawsuit against the mayor over a payment dispute in 1886 and later moved to Hawera and Auckland. (Note: It is unknown whether O'Dea meant Auckland City or the Auckland Province when referring to having been in Auckland) By 1888 O'Dea was in Wellington. (Note: O'Dea had placed tender for a Ngauranga abattoir in 1887 but a newspaper reported O'Dea departing Hawera in 1888) In Wellington O'Dea designed roughly 150 buildings, notably Our Lady's Home of Compassion in Island Bay. By the 20th century O'Dea's business had become successful and he was looking to hire a draughtsmans and two years later his son joined his business. In 1906 O'Dea designed the Our Lady's Home of Compassion building in Island Bay but there was controversy over structural deficits in the building, with some blaming the architect. John Swan was hired instead of O'Dea for the repair works. In 1907 he broke his leg and stopped his practice.

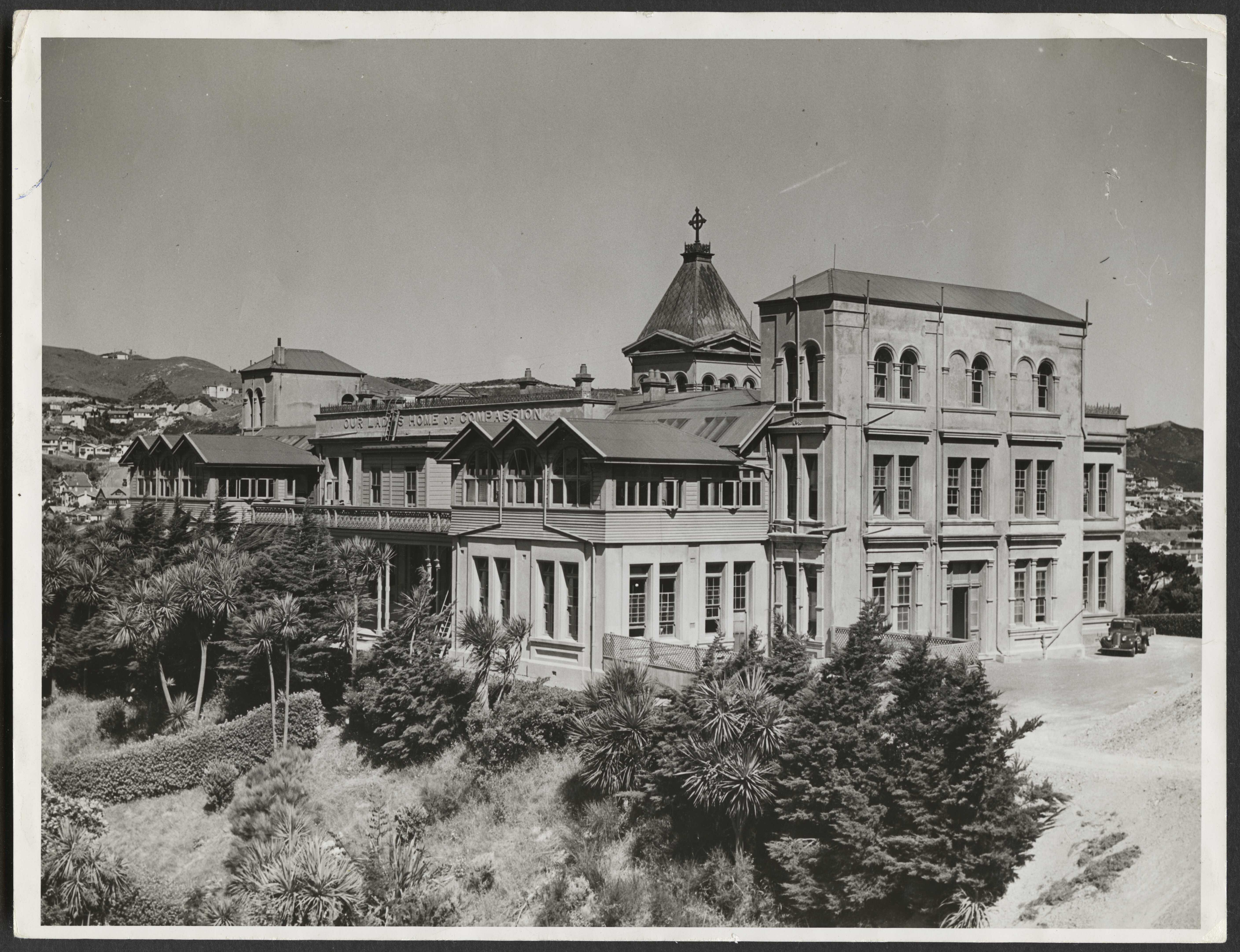
Our Lady's Home of Compassion in 1938

In 1910 O'Dea was selling designs at an 80% discount but no building permits were issued with his name, suggesting that no one had bought these designs. In 1911 O'Dea was promoting ferroconcrete, stating that it would make other materials obsolete and that 'its age is as unlimited as that of the aqueducts and bridges built by Rome when she was mistress of the world' but there is no record of him after that and he faded into obscurity and died in 1930 without undertaking any further architectural work.

== Personal life ==
O'Dea was a Roman Catholic and married his wife in 1879. O'Dea was elected as president for the Liberal Association in 1893.

== List of works ==
Name	Date	Image	Note	Ref
St Mary's Monastery	1884		Demolished 1938	
T.G. Macarthy Trust Building	1897		Registered as a category 2 building with Heritage New Zealand	
Royal Oak Hotel	1899		Demolished 1979	
Tramway Hotel	1899		Scheduled with the Wellington City Council	
89 Austin Street, Mount Victoria	1900		Scheduled with the Wellington City Council	
People's Palace	1904		Registered as a category 2 building with Heritage New Zealand	
Alexandra Building	1905		Registered as a category 2 building with Heritage New Zealand	
Kennedy Buildings	1905		Registered as a category 2 building with Heritage New Zealand	
Our Lady's Home of Compassion	1906		Demolished	
