= Paper hanger =

Paper hanger may refer to:

- A tradesman who applies wallpaper to a wall
- Cheque fraud, the unlawful use of cheques
- Paper hanger (Mundelein's speech), given by Cardinal George Mundelein regarding Adolf Hitler before World War II
- "Paper Hanger", a song by mewithoutYou from Catch for Us the Foxes
