= Gross Point Village Hall =

- U.S. National Register of Historic Places
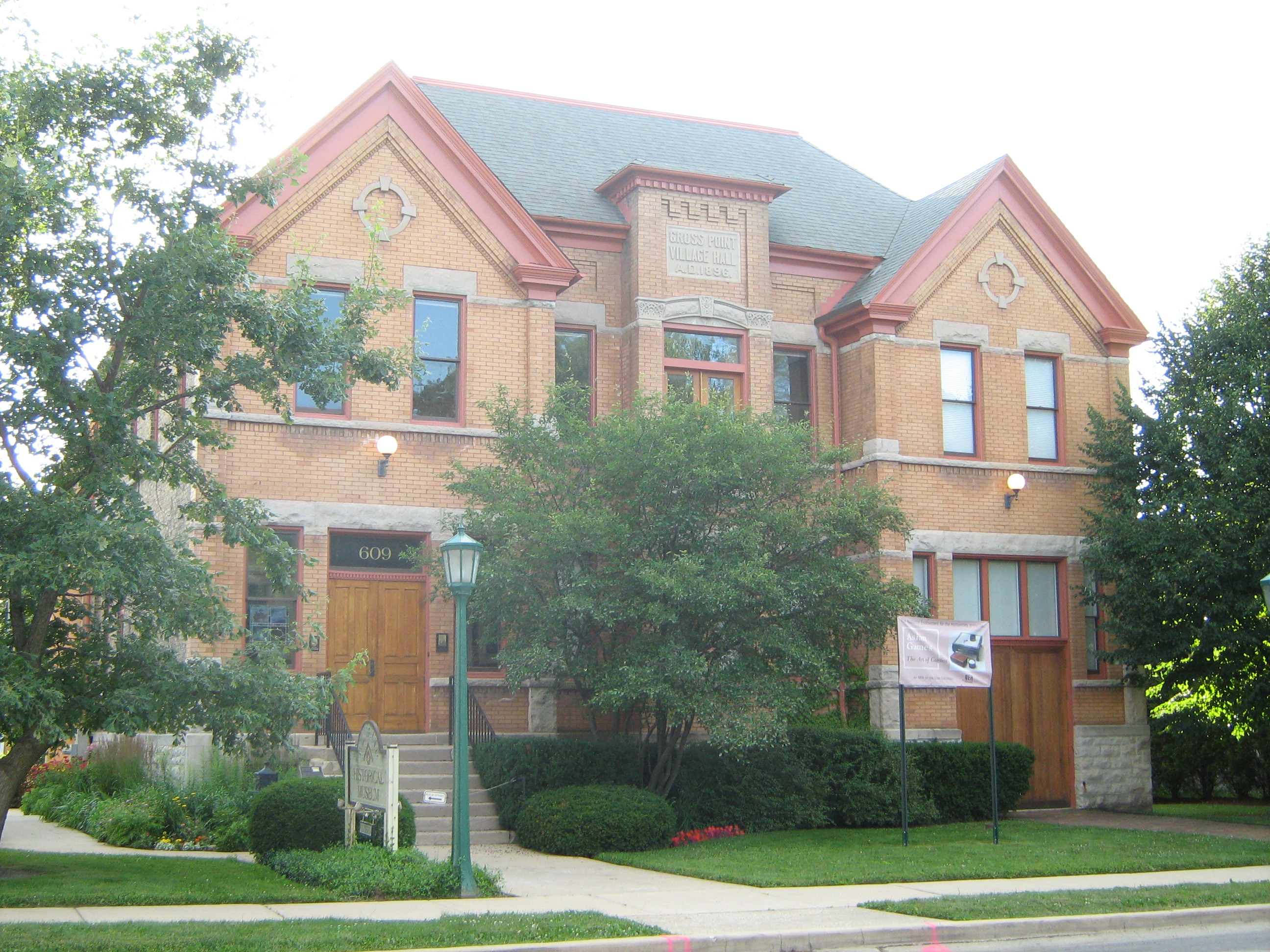

- Location within Chicago metropolitan area Location within Illinois Location within the United States
- Location: 609 Ridge Rd., Wilmette, Illinois
- Coordinates: 42°04′33″N 87°43′22″W
- Area: less than one acre
- Built: 1896
- Built by: Heinzen, Joseph
- Architect: Fischer, Alb.
- Architectural style: Victorian
- NRHP reference No.: 91001001
- Added to NRHP: August 5, 1991

The Gross Point Village Hall, located at 609 Ridge Road in Wilmette, Illinois, was the village hall of the defunct village of Gross Point, Illinois. The village of Gross Point, named for a French description of a turn in nearby Lake Michigan's shoreline, was settled from the 1830s onward and incorporated in 1874. In 1896, Gross Point built a village hall to both house its government and serve as a community center. The two-story brick building has a Victorian design with two projecting front entrances, which originally led to the fire department and the village offices respectively. The small village relied heavily on alcohol taxes to fund its government, and had many taverns as a result; protests from prohibitionists in nearby Evanston, combined with opposition to new taxes to fund a sewer system, led to the village voting to dissolve itself in 1919. The village hall was sold to a private resident to pay back debts from the sewer system.

The building was added to the National Register of Historic Places on August 5, 1991. It is now home to the Wilmette Historical Museum.
