= St. Joseph Catholic Church (Wilmette, Illinois) =

Historic church in Illinois, United States

St. Joseph Catholic Church is a parish of the Archdiocese of Chicago. The church is located in Wilmette, Illinois, United States, at the corner of Lake Ave and Ridge Road. Although St. Joseph's Mission (the "Log Cabin Mission") was founded in 1842, it wasn't recognized as a parish until 1845 by Chicago's first Catholic bishop, William Quarter to serve German Catholic immigrants from Trier, Germany. The first assigned priest and pastor was Father G.H. Plathe in 1845, who was followed by Fr. Johann Fortmann in 1847. In May of 1852, Fr. Fortmann was appointed to begin St. Henry's Catholic Church, which was placed at the halfway point between St. Joseph's Wilmette, and downtown Chicago where the diocese was based. The removal of the beloved Fr. Fortmann caused a lot of turmoil in the isolated parish. Before the end of 1852, the diocese reverted St. Joseph's "Parish" back to a "Mission" for several months, due to the inability of getting a priest to go there.

After running through a series of short-term pastors, Father William Netstraeter, would serve the parish for five decades beginning in 1872, as well as become a Wilmette trustee and help found New Trier High School. In 1873, the church opened a school, taught by nuns from Milwaukee's School Sisters of St. Francis from 1877 until 1981; the Archdiocese of Chicago closed the school in 1986, but parish families reopened it a decade later.

== The 1939 Church ==
In the wake of Fr. Netstraeter's death in 1924, his will indicated that the money in his estate go towards the construction of a brand new church - under the condition that the parishioners contribute any lacking monetary sum to complete the job should the bequeathed money fall short. The parishioners were unaware of this generous gift from their former pastor, and were not prepared to embark on this task in 1924. The old St. Joseph's Church was located on the north side of Lake Avenue, which is the current parking lot of St. Joseph's School, adjacent to the cemetery. Since the parish was not ready to commence the project, the money was borrowed by Cardinal George Mundelein and put towards the construction of University of St. Mary of the Lake.

Thirteen years later, in the aftermath of the Paper hanger (Mundelein's speech) controversy, without any warning, St. Joseph's Parish was sued by an estranged distant family in Germany claiming to be relatives of Fr. Netstraeter, in attempt to collect the bequeathed money mentioned in his will. This was clearly seen as a hoax and legal maneuver on the part of the Nazi Party in retaliation against Cardinal Mundelein for publicly attacking Adolf Hitler. A Chicago court validated that Fr. Netstraeter's will was valid and the money was quickly returned to St. Joseph's, and construction the church began immediately. The new church was completed in 1939, and its dedication in October was Cardinal Mundelein's last public appearance before his death.

In the 1990s, the church edifice was, in jest, called the "cathedral of the north shore" by the parish secretary, Maria Friedrich. Following her death in 2008, the St. Joseph's Church would be referred to by that nickname as a memorial to her.

St. Francis Xavier Church began in 1904 and would merge with St. Joseph Parish in 2019 with much controversy. Saint Francis Xavier Church is located in Wilmette, at the corner of Linden Ave and 9th Street. The founding of both parishes would be highlighted in the 2023 documentary, Holy Ground.

== List of St. Joseph's Wilmette Pastors ==
Father Gerhard M. Plathe (1845-1847)
Father Johann "Henry" N. Fortmann (1847-1852)
Father J.B.U. Jacoment (1852)
Father Lawrence Kuepfer (1852-1853)
Father Nicholas Stauder (1853-1855)
Father Anthony Kopp (1855-1860)
Father Peter Kartlaub (1860)
Father Tschider (1861)
Father Franz Blaesinger (1861-1864)
Father Bernard Heskemann (1864-1872)
Father William Netstraeter (1872-1923)
Monsignor John Neumann (1923-1964)
Monsignor Charles Meter (1964-1981)
Father Donald Cusack (1982-1993)
Bishop Francis J. Kane (1993-2003)
Monsignor John Pollard (2003-2010)
Father Robert Tonelli (2010-2017)
Monsignor Daniel Mayall (2017-2019)
Father Wayne F. Watts (2019-present)
