= Wilmette Public Library =

Library in Wilmette, Illinois

Coordinates: 42.0749°N 87.7094°W

- Location: Wilmette, Illinois, United States
- Established: 1901

Collection
- Size: 268,862 volumes (2013-2014 Annual Report data)

Access and use
- Circulation: 735,568

Other information
- Director: Anthony Auston
- Website: Wilmette Public Library

The Wilmette Public Library serves the residents of Kenilworth and Wilmette, Illinois, United States, on Chicago's North Shore.

== History ==
The library was founded in 1901, but traces its origins to private nonprofit lending libraries created as early as 1880. It has occupied several different buildings, including one opened in 1905 which was built with a grant from Andrew Carnegie. The current building includes an auditorium which is used for concerts, lectures, travelogues, workshops, plays, seminars and artist receptions.

Private nonprofit lending libraries predated the founding of the Wilmette library. In 1880, at a time when Wilmette had only 419 residents, approximately 50 of its residents formed a literary society. Using initiation fees and collections taken during lectures, the society bought books for a library collection which they housed in the back of what had been town's earliest store, Kinney's General Store. In 1882 the society was incorporated into the "Wilmette Library Association". Separately, a "Library and Social Club" formed in 1889 with donated books forming a collection at the Methodist Church. This second organization was incorporated as the "Elmwood Library Association" in April 1892. A In 1897 the Woman's Club of Wilmette began renting space at a grocery store and circulating books, with its club members acting as librarians. At one point the village housed a small collection at Royal Arcanum Hall.

In 1900, by a vote of 62 to 52, Wilmette taxpayers approved a referendum which would establish a free public library. A $2 million tax issue was approved. In April 1901, the original six Wilmette Library Directors were elected. The library space it rented in the rear of a lumber company. The Elmwood Library Association loaned a thousand of its books to the village's new library. The library formally opened in 1901. In its first year, more than 500 borrowers registered with the library and more than 9,000 volumes were circulated.

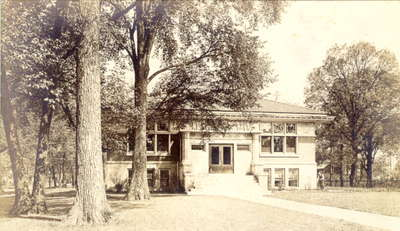
Carnegie library in Wilmette, Illinois. Photo taken 1908-1912.

In 1902, in response to an inquiry from the Library Board, Andrew Carnegie (who had been a benefactor in the construction of many libraries) agreed to give $10,000 to build the library a building with the condition that the village would provide a suitable location for the library at no cost and would agree to support the library with at least $1,000 in funds annually. In 1903, an advisory referendum was held presenting village voters with three possible locations for the library building. In 1904 the village purchased a site for the library and accepted Carnegie's offer. The new Carnegie library building was opened in 1905.

The current building was constructed in 1951 on the site of the original 1901 Carnegie library. The new structure won an architectural award for design from the American Institute of Architects. It was expanded over the years to meet the needs of library patrons, with an expansion in 1988 essentially doubling the size of the building. The library has been an essential part of life in Wilmette, as shown by the fact that 94% of the residents have a library card, far above the national average, and per capita circulation is a high 23 items.

In another referendum in 1975, the library was converted into a district entity. Six months later, in 1976, a referendum to include Kenilworth in the district failed to pass. It wasn't until 1983 that a contract was established of Wilmette's library district providing services to Kenilworth, which still remains today.

The library's innovative creation of online book discussion groups received favorable notice from the American Library Association. The library was awarded the 2008 ALA Presidential Citation for the Game Maker Academy program established by librarian Brian Myers and offered at WPL as well as a number of other area libraries.

In 2015, the library embarked on a renovation project that updated all restrooms to ensure full ADA compliance. It also included the installation of eco-friendly restroom fixtures and improvements to the changing areas for children.

== Special features ==
=== Media room ===
As part of the library's 2009/2010 Revitalization Project, the media room features thousands of CDs and DVDs along with Playaways, audiobooks, and university coursework disk sets. This is an inviting room, as it features tables and benches for relaxing.

=== Recent arrivals area ===
New additions to the library's collection are located here, along with book club selections, ELL (English language learning) materials, and an on-site librarian.

=== Friends of the Library Computer Center ===
The innovative Computer Lab features 12 PCs with full internet access and remote printing capabilities. The lab is open to all library patrons.

=== Teen Room ===
The Teen Room is intended for group study, smaller activities, and club meetings among teenagers. Adult use is restricted.

=== The study ===
Located away from all the noise and pedestrian flow of the library, the study offers a quiet place for reading and private studying.

=== Lower level auditorium ===
The 100 person capacity auditorium is used for art shows, recitals and other library functions.

== Current services ==
=== Youth services ===
Free youth services events offered throughout the year include Babytime, Rhymetime, Preschool Storytime, and kids' book groups.

In 2015, the library hosted a variety of scheduled activities, including Mother-Daughter Book Club, Light Painting, Lego Club, Pajama Storytime, Mardi Gras Masks, Youth Improv, Year of the Goat Storytime, and Chinese New Year Celebration.

During the summer of 2015, the library and Wilmette Park District invited families to participate in "Stories in the Park," which included stories and songs with Wilmette librarians in a variety of local parks.

Books Down Under

The Wilmette Public Library also operates Books Down Under, a bookshop that sells gently used donated books, with funds going back to the library. Hours of operation can be found online.
