= Wilmette Public Schools District 39 =

School district in Illinois, United States

Coordinates: 42°4′28.2″N 87°44′35.2″W

Address
- 615 Locust Road Wilmette, Illinois, 60091; United States

District information
- Type: Public
- Grades: PreK–8
- NCES District ID: 1742600
- District ID: IL-05-016-0390-02

Students and staff
- Students: 3,285

Other information
- Website: www.wilmette39.org

Wilmette Public Schools District 39 (D39) is a school district headquartered in the Mikaelian Education Center in Wilmette, Illinois in the Chicago metropolitan area. The boundaries of the school district include most of Wilmette, a small part of southeastern Glenview, with a population of 27,247 as of 2019, and a neighborhood in unincorporated Cook County with Winnetka addresses. Both Highcrest and Wilmette Junior High School are home to multiple special education and differentiation programs.

== Schools ==
Elementary schools (Grades K-4):

- Romona Elementary
- Central Elementary
- McKenzie Elementary
- Harper Elementary

Middle and Junior High schools (Grades 5-8):

- Highcrest Middle School (Grades 5-6)
- Wilmette Junior High School (7-8)

As of April 2020, the Illinois State Board of Education maintained a summative designation of "Exemplary" for Romona Elementary and Central Elementary, which indicates performance in the top ten percent of schools statewide with no under-performing student groups. As of 2024, Highcrest middle school had approximately 375 sixth graders and 400 5th graders, with more growth expected. Students from the four K-4 elementary schools funnel into Highcrest in 5th grade, and go there for two years before moving buildings to Wilmette Junior High School.

Students in this district are zoned to New Trier High School in Winnetka, Illinois.
