= Paper hanger (Mundelein's speech) =

1937 speech by Catholic cardinal George Mundelein

The paper hanger speech refers to an address by Cardinal George Mundelein to 500 priests of his Roman Catholic Archdiocese of Chicago, at the Archbishop Quigley Preparatory Seminary, in Chicago, Illinois, on May 18, 1937. In the speech he made observations on the transformation of German public opinion.

'Perhaps you will ask how it is that a nation of 60 million intelligent people will submit in fear and servitude to an alien, an Austrian paper hanger, and a poor one at that, and a few associates like Goebbels and Göring, who dictate every move of the people's lives?' The Cardinal went on to suggest that the brains of 60 million Germans had been removed without their even noticing it. (Hitler's Pope, p. 183)

There is disagreement as to whether Adolf Hitler ever worked applying wallpaper or not. The paper hanger term was nonetheless pejorative, suggesting a laborer performing a task which required more hand–eye coordination than intellect, and one who offered ersatz art rather than original art. Accordingly, the term became popular among those who opposed Hitler's ideas rather than among those who endorsed them.

Hitler retaliated by organizing a German family to contest the will of Fr. William Netstraeter, the deceased pastor of St. Joseph Catholic Church (Wilmette, Illinois) whose sum of $300,000 was currently being borrowed by Cardinal Mundelein to construct the University of St. Mary of the Lake. A Chicago circuit court eventually determined the will valid, and the funds were quickly used to construct the current church in Wilmette.

== In popular culture ==
The phrase was used in the song "Springtime for Hitler" from the musical The Producers when the flamboyant Hitler begins a satirical monologue with the phrase: "I was just a paper hanger, no one more obscurer".

The story was featured in a documentary about Father Netstraeter, Cathedral of the North Shore, and in the book Rev. William Netstraeter: A Life in Three Parts.
