= Frederick B. Carter Jr. House =

Historic house in Illinois, United States

- U.S. National Register of Historic Places
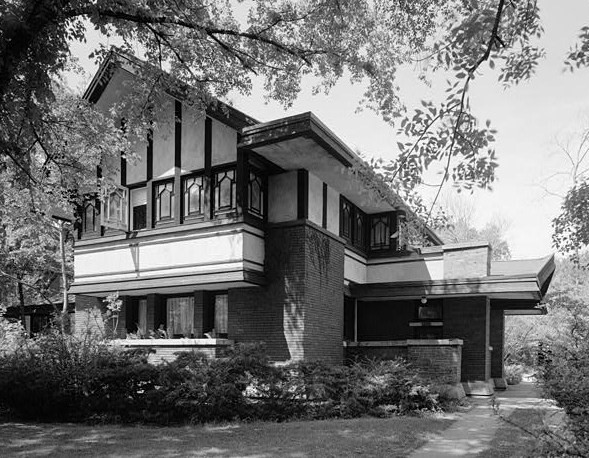
- HABS photo of the house

- Location within Illinois Location within the United States
- Location: 1024 Judson Ave., Evanston, Illinois
- Coordinates: 42°02′11″N 87°40′37″W
- Area: less than one acre
- Built: 1910
- Architect: Griffin, Walter Burley
- Architectural style: Prairie School
- NRHP reference No.: 74000758
- Added to NRHP: July 30, 1974

The Frederick B. Carter Jr. House is a historic house located at 1024 Judson Avenue in Evanston, Illinois. Architect Walter Burley Griffin designed the Prairie School house, which was built in 1910. The house is an early example of Griffin's attempts to develop a style independent of his mentor, Frank Lloyd Wright. The exterior of the house is made of brick and stucco with wooden half-timbering and trim. The house's form is distinguished by several projecting and receding masses. Its roof includes a large gable in front and overhanging eaves, both over the gable and on the flat section of roof to the side.

The house was added to the National Register of Historic Places on July 30, 1974.
