= House at 8 Berkley Drive =

Historic house in New York, United States

- U.S. National Register of Historic Places
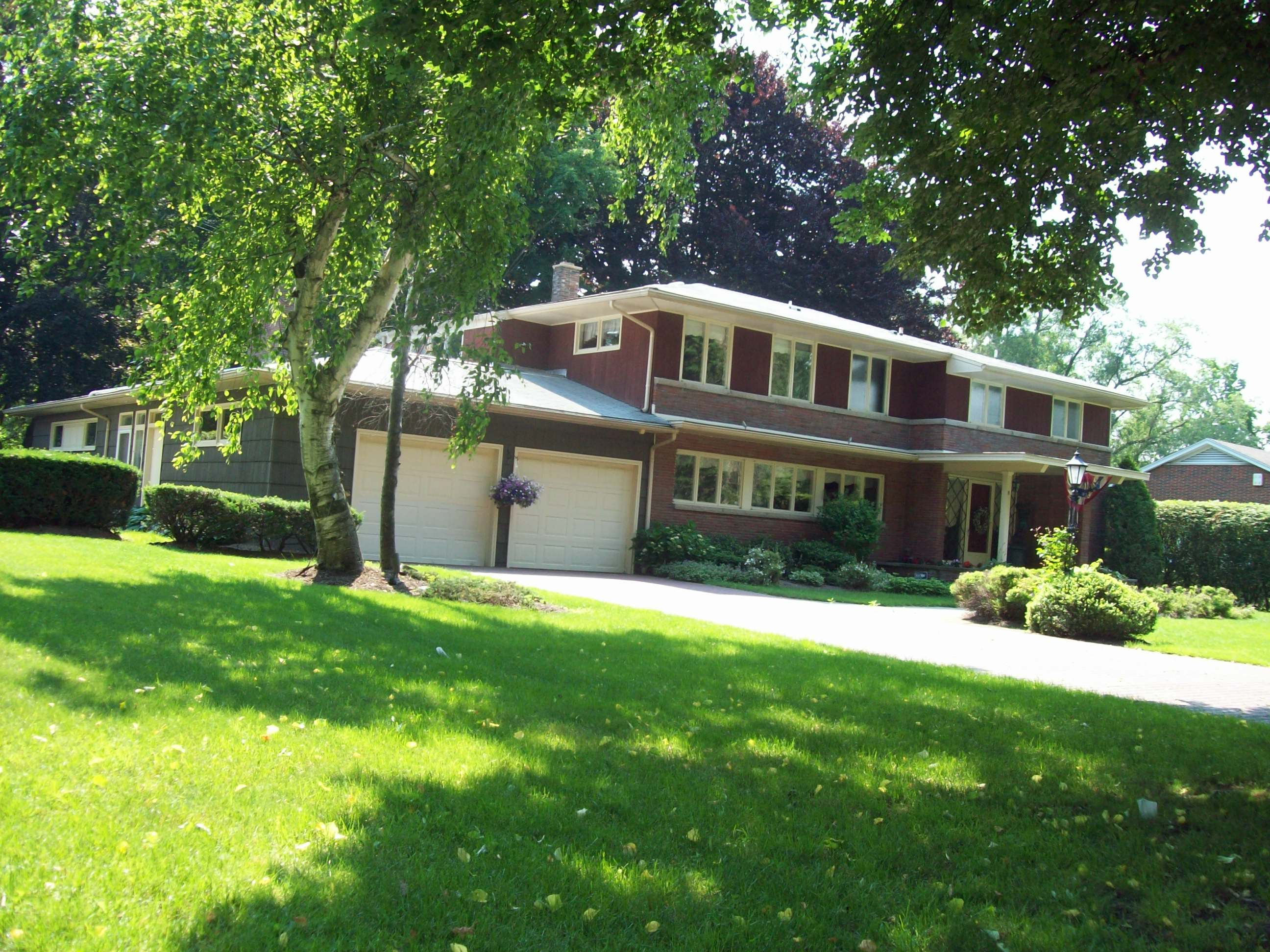
- House at 8 Berkley Drive, June 2009

- Location within New York Location within the United States
- Location: 8 Berkley Drive., Lockport, New York
- Coordinates: 43°9′19.42″N 78°41′17.01″W
- Area: less than one acre
- Built: 1957
- Architect: Duane Lyman & Associates; Kenneth J. Pembroke
- Architectural style: Prairie style
- NRHP reference No.: 09000287
- Added to NRHP: May 4, 2009

8 Berkley Drive is a historic house located at the address of the same name in Lockport, Niagara County, New York.

== Description and history ==
It is a two-story, Prairie-style home designed by noted regional architect Duane Lyman in 1957. It was designed and built for the late Laurence Maxwell Ferguson and his wife Lurana Persing Ferguson.

It was listed on the National Register of Historic Places on May 4, 2009.
