= Ransom Buffalow =

American architect

Ransom Buffalow (1861–1922) was an architect in Jacksonville, Florida. Buffalow was born in North Carolina. He worked in Graham, Virginia, Seattle, Denver, and Knoxville before moving to Jacksonville in 1910. He designed several homes in the Riverside and Avondale Historic District neighborhoods and is known for his work in the Prairie School architectural style. He designed the Ransom Buffalow House (1922).

== Works ==
- William P. Baldwin residence at 1805 Copeland Street
- Turner Z. Cason residence at 2331 River Boulevard (demolished)
- 2805 Riverside Avenue
- 2981 Riverside Avenue
- Buffalow residence at 3305 Riverside Avenue (completed after his death)
