= First Congregational Church of Austin =

Historic church in Illinois, United States

- U.S. National Register of Historic Places
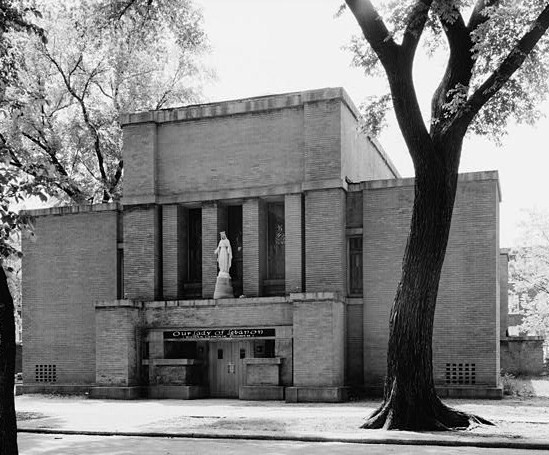
- Photo of the church from the Historic American Buildings Survey (the statue was not part of the original design by Drummond)

- Location within Chicago metropolitan area Location within Illinois Location within the United States
- Location: 5701 W. Midway Place; Chicago, Illinois; USA
- Coordinates: 41°53′19″N 87°46′5″W
- Area: 1 acre (0.40 ha)
- Built: 1908
- Architect: William Eugene Drummond
- NRHP reference No.: 77000474
- Added to NRHP: November 17, 1977

First Congregational Church of Austin, also known as Greater Holy Temple of God in Christ, is a historic church at 5701 West Midway Place in Chicago, Illinois. The church was built in 1905 for a Congregational assembly; it was later used by Seventh-Day Adventist, Roman Catholic, and Church of God in Christ congregations. A Chicago building permit was issued on August 15, 1905 according to the Chicago Tribune of August 16, 1905. Architect William Eugene Drummond, a student of Louis Sullivan and a sometime employee of Frank Lloyd Wright, designed the church in the Prairie School style; it is an unusual example of a Prairie School church and influenced Wright's Unity Temple which was designed after the original church burned on June 4, 1905. The one-story building consists of a tall central section with massive piers and a smaller section to either side. The entrance is recessed in the base of the central section; the doorway features lintels and posts that continue the building's rectilinear emphasis. Leaded glass windows are recessed in the spaces between the central section's piers.

The church was added to the National Register of Historic Places on November 17, 1977.
