= Café Brauer =

- Lincoln Park, South Pond Refectory
- U.S. National Register of Historic Places
- Chicago Landmark
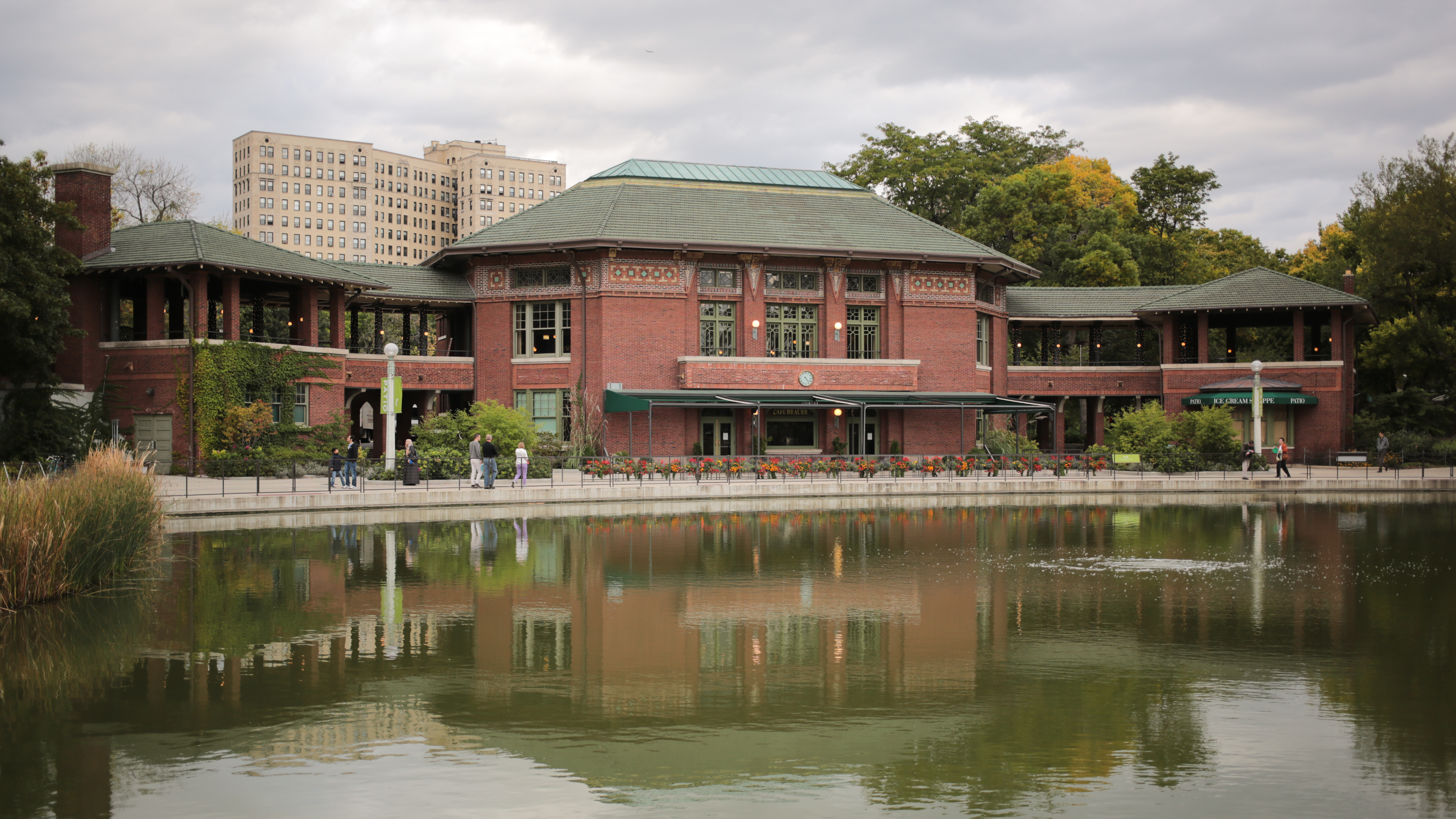

- Location within Chicago metropolitan area Location within Illinois Location within the United States
- Location: 2021 N. Stockton Dr., Chicago, Illinois
- Coordinates: 41°55′9″N 87°38′2″W
- Built: 1908
- Architect: Perkins & Hamilton
- Architectural style: Prairie School
- NRHP reference No.: 86003154

Significant dates
- Added to NRHP: November 20, 1986
- Designated CHICL: February 5, 2003

Café Brauer (also known as the South Pond Refectory) is a restaurant building and official landmark located in Lincoln Park in Chicago, Illinois, at the edge of the Lincoln Park Zoo. It was designed by Dwight H. Perkins and completed in 1908.

The building, known for its green roof, red bricks, second floor ballroom, and lagoon-side setting, has been called "an outstanding example of the Prairie School of architecture" and "perhaps the finest expression of Perkins' design philosophy". It was financed by the Brauer family of Chicago, who worked in the restaurant business, and was one of the most popular restaurants in Chicago during the early twentieth century. Caspar Brauer, who died at age 68 on April 29, 1940, was the longtime proprietor of Café Brauer.

The original restaurant closed in the 1940s. In 1947, Café Brauer's second floor ballroom was opened to the public as an indoor recreation room featuring ballroom dancing for children, square dancing, and waltzing. At the time, it was announced that the facility would be renamed the Lincoln Fieldhouse. By the 1960s, the structure was largely used for storage. Part of the second floor was used as a theater, and there was a small cafeteria on the first floor. A nine-member committee was chosen on October 10, 1967 by Chicago Park Board Vice-President Daniel Shannon to look into restoring the structure as a restaurant-ballroom and adding an outdoor dance pavilion. Their project never moved forward because of restrictions on the sale of alcohol in park district facilities.

In 1987, the Lincoln Park Zoo Society began a $4.2 million restoration project. The second floor ballroom was renovated so that it could be used for private events, and the first floor was remodeled as a small family restaurant and ice cream parlor.

Café Brauer was listed on the National Register of Historic Places in 1986, and it received Chicago Landmark status on February 5, 2003.

The building is located on the site of the South Pond Refectory, a wood-frame boathouse and restaurant designed by William Le Baron Jenney which was open from 1882 until 1908. Café Brauer is sometimes called the South Pond Refectory, the primary name for the site used in its National Register nomination.

== Gallery ==
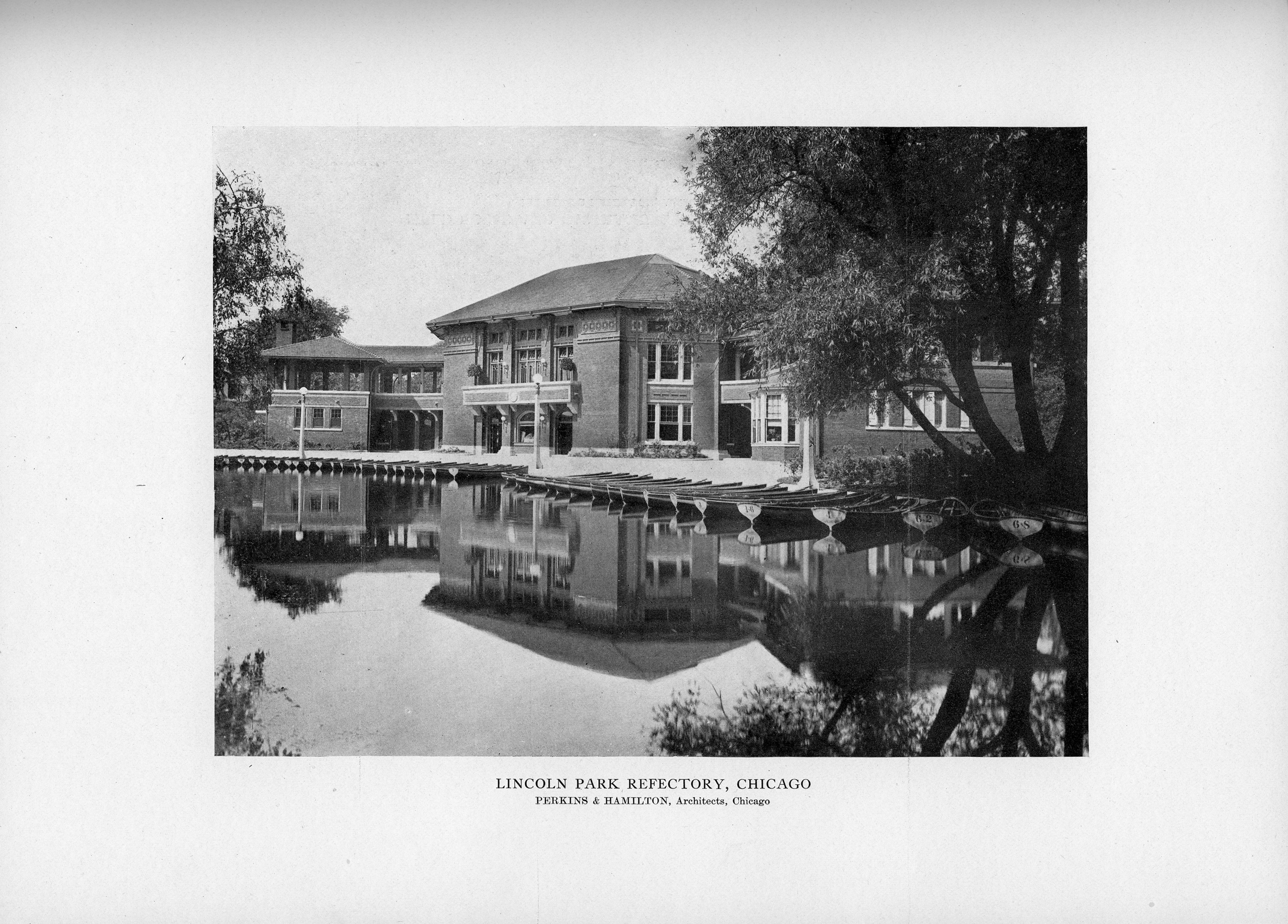
Café Brauer in 1908

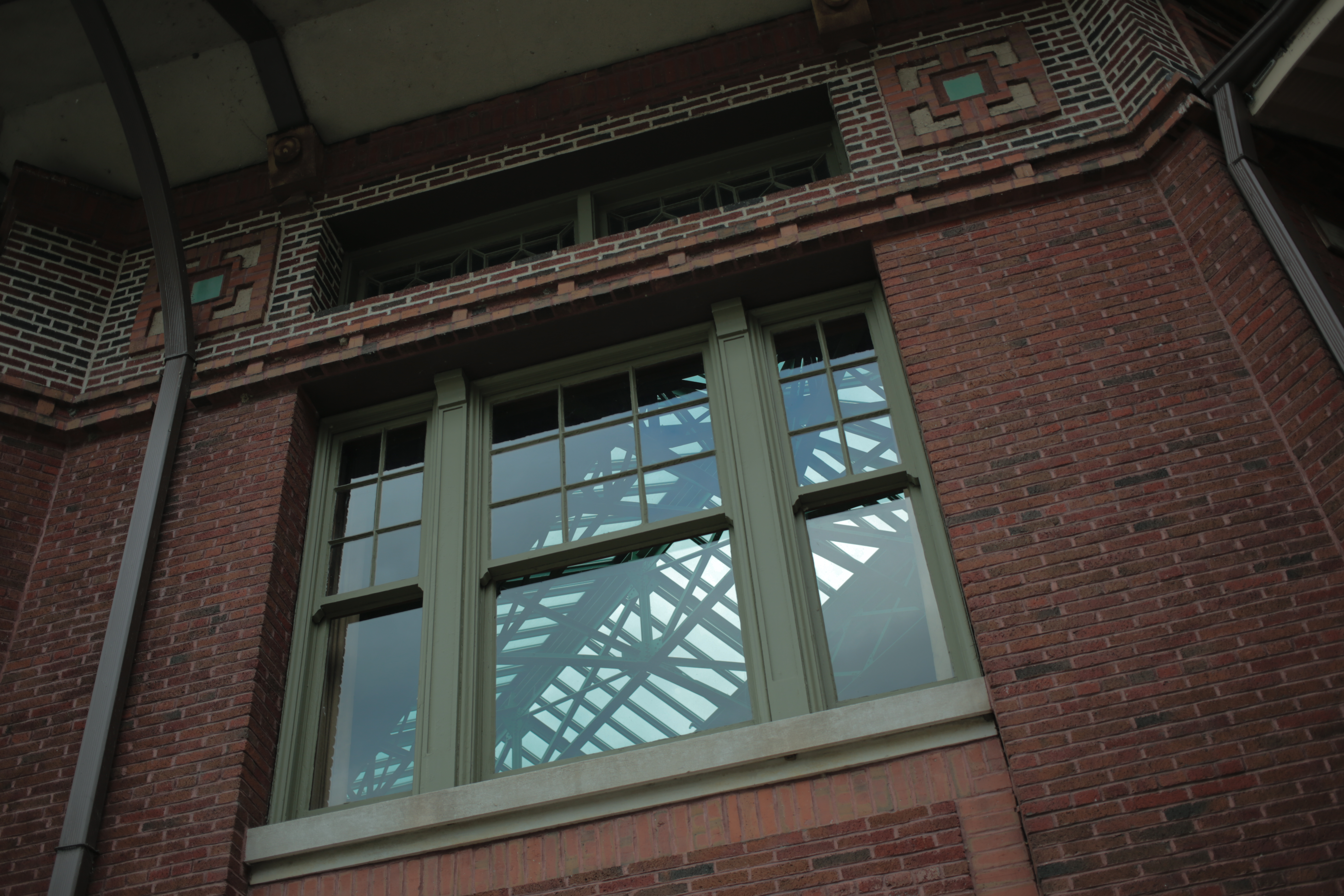
view from the exterior sidewalk of the atrium

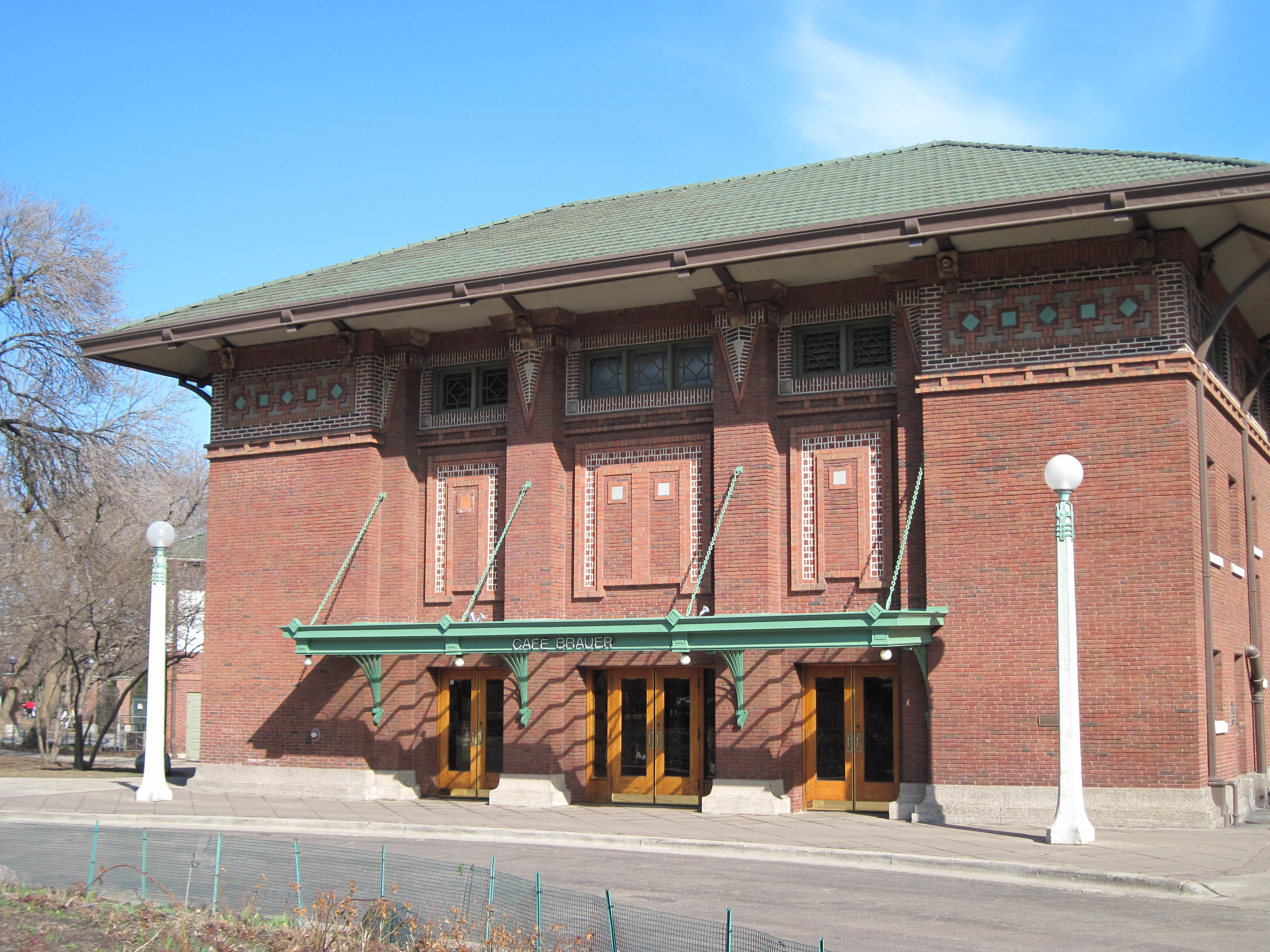
Café Brauer from Stockton Drive

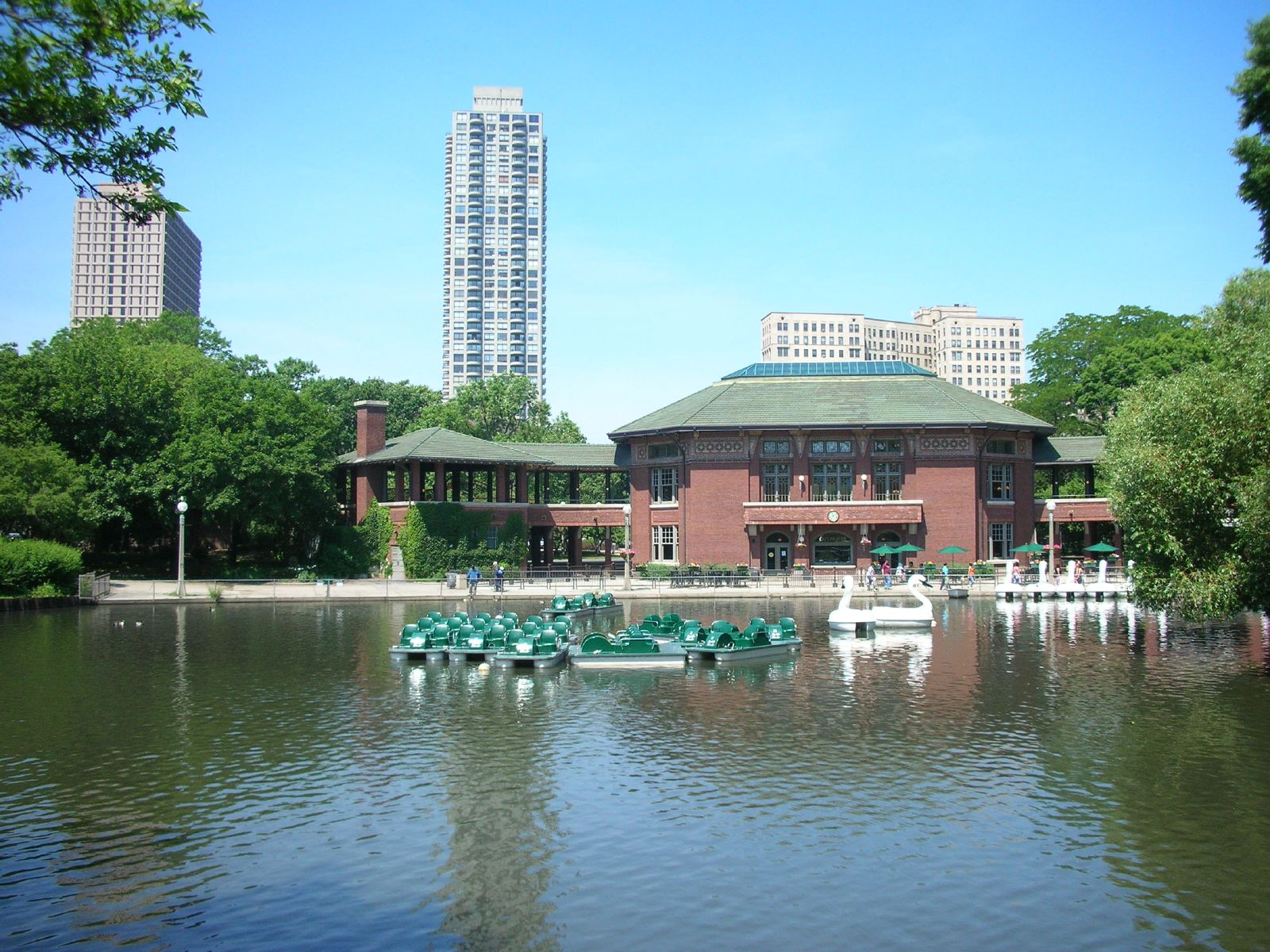
Before 2010 restoration of South Pond into a nature reserve, paddle boats could be rented

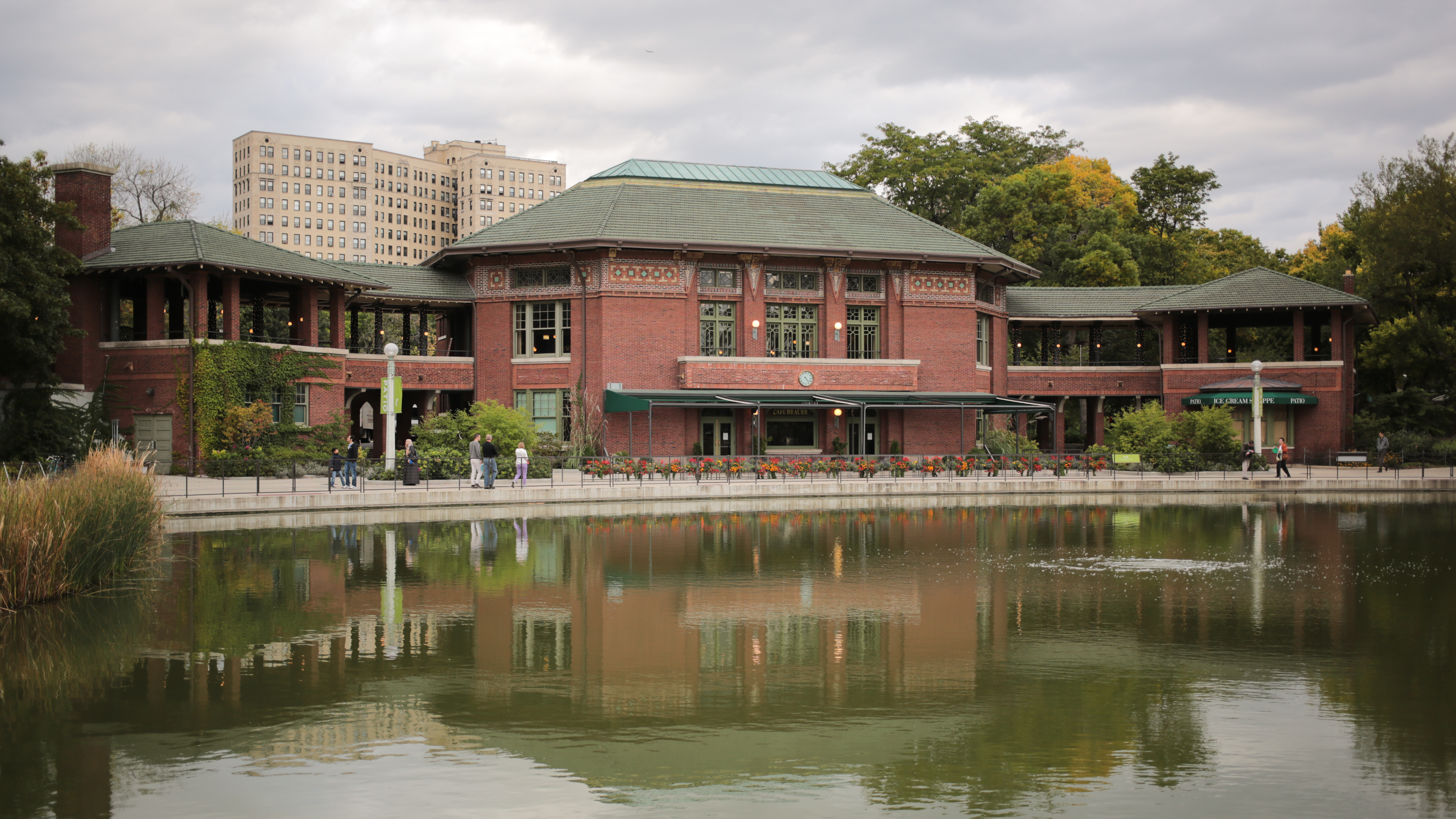
South Pond and Café Brauer in 2013

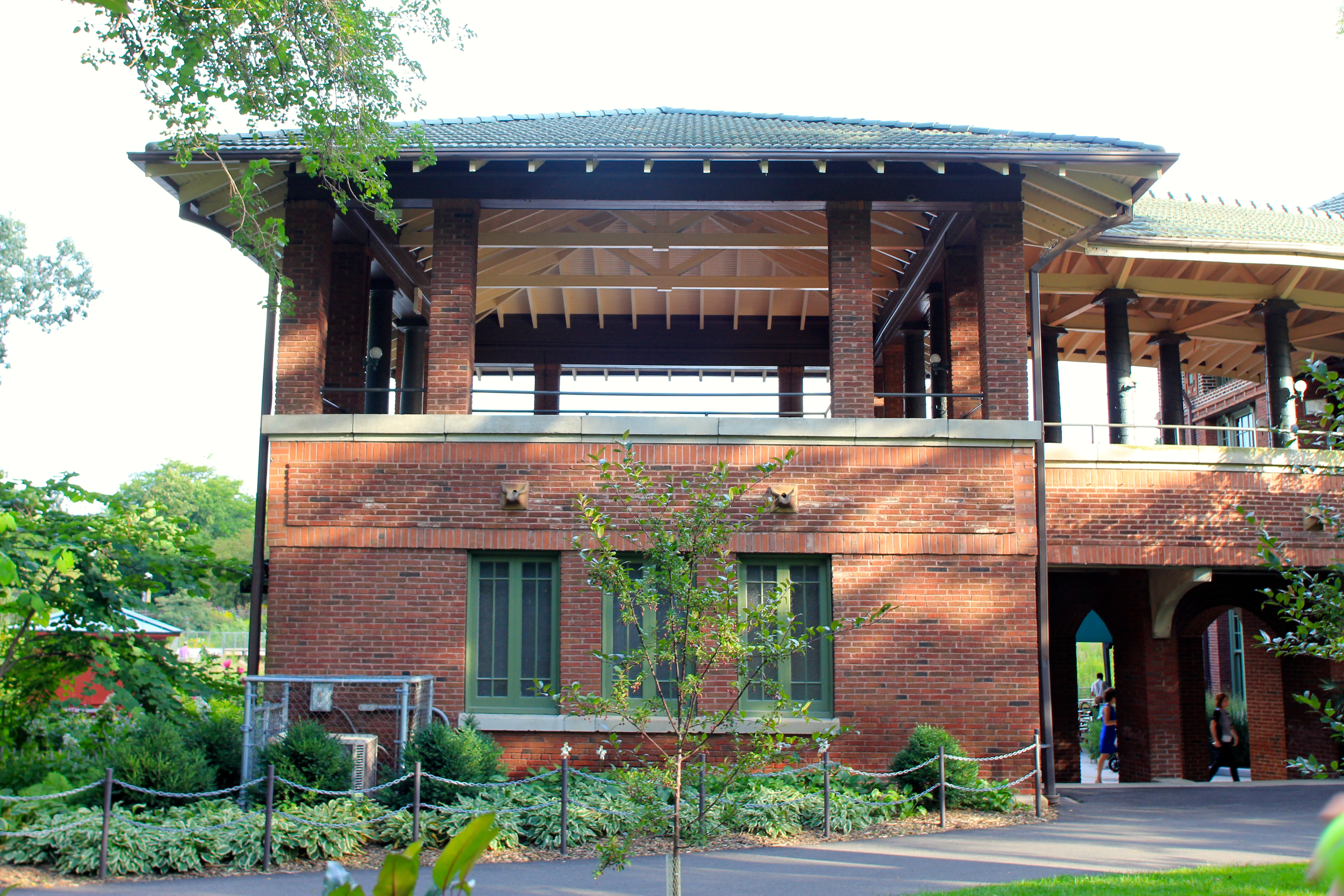
close-up of a porch
