= Prairie School =

Architectural style

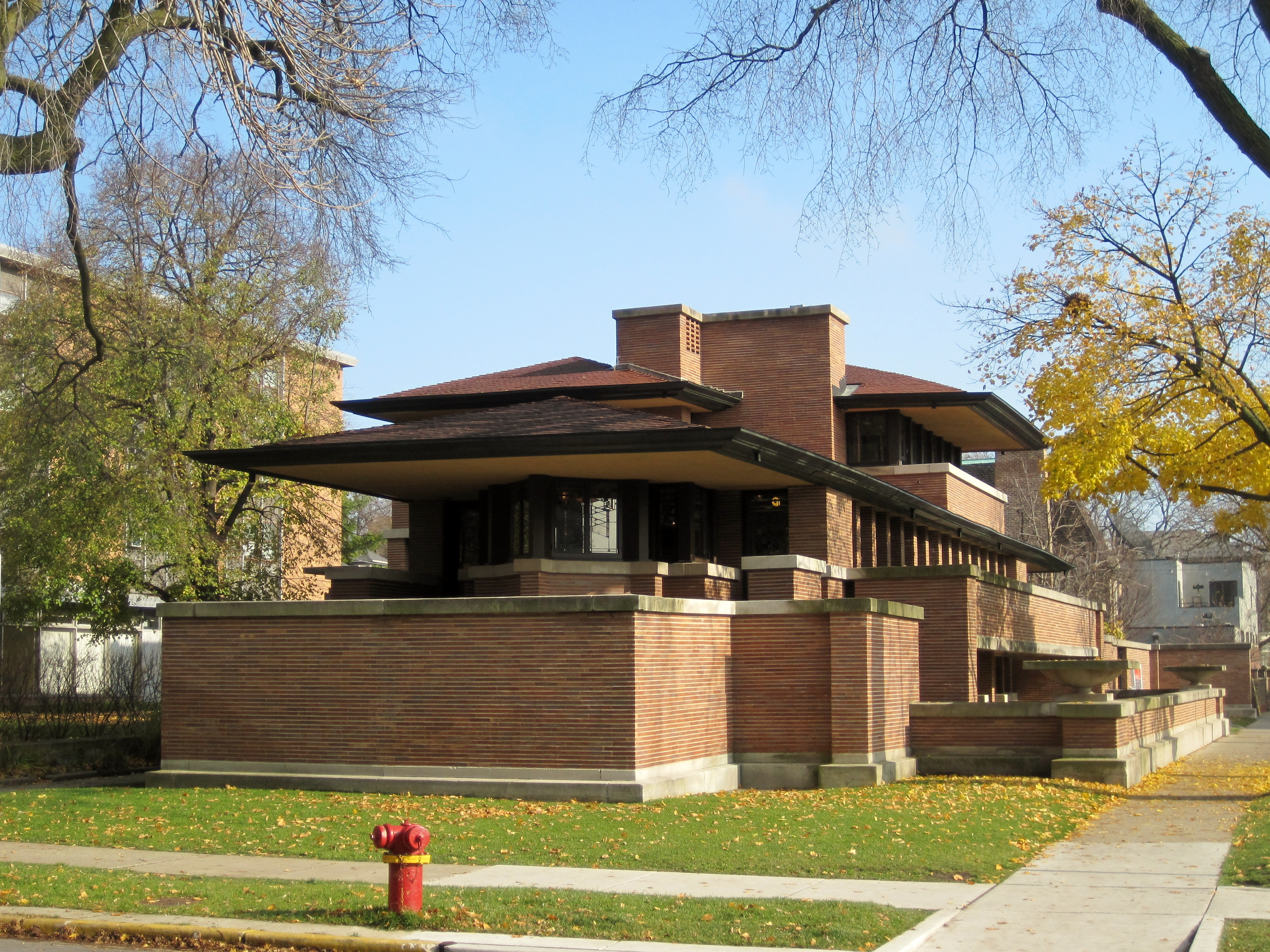
The Prairie style Robie House, a Frank Lloyd Wright design in Chicago, 1910

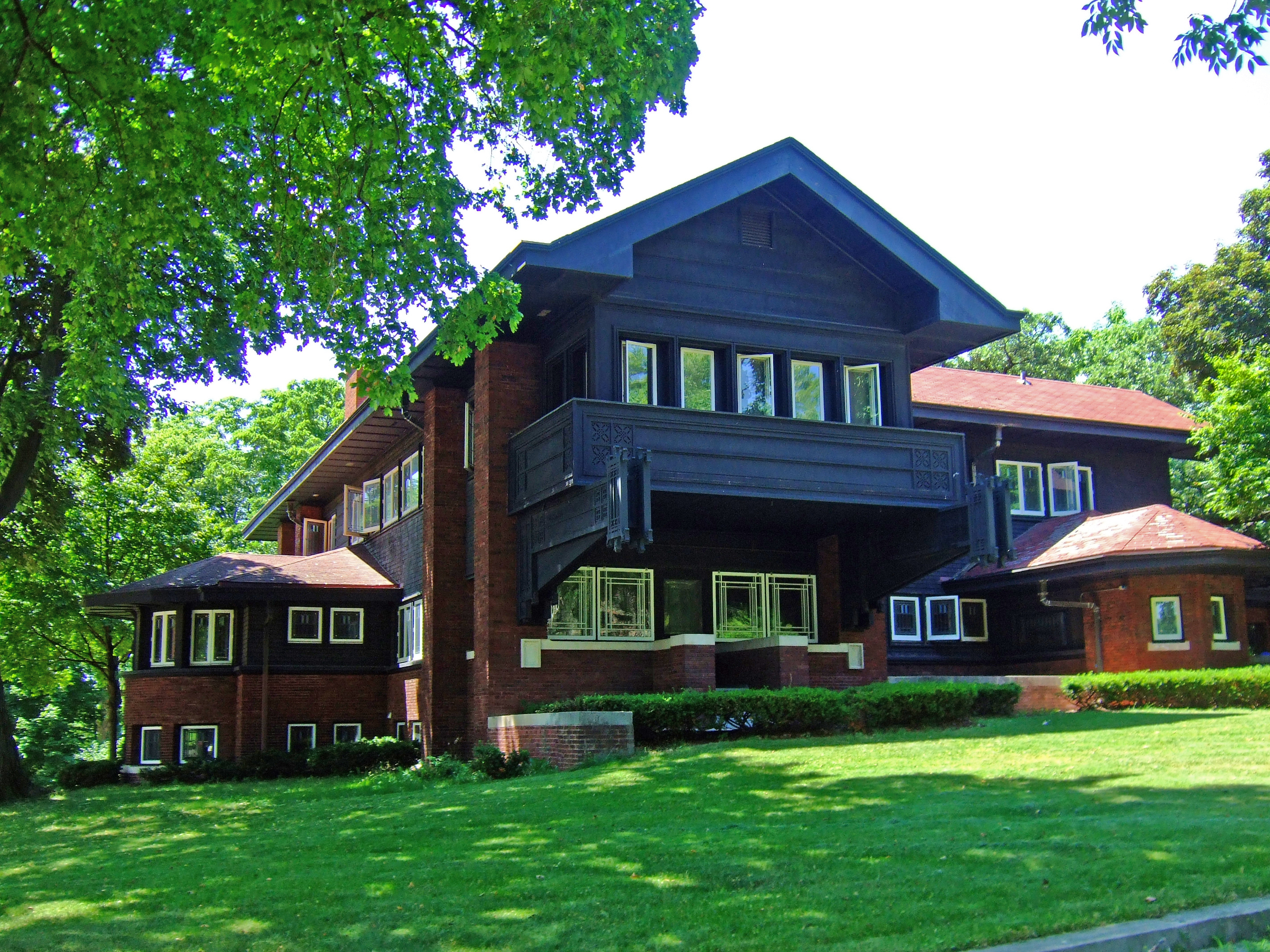
Harold C. Bradley House, Madison, Wisconsin, by Louis Sullivan and George Grant Elmslie

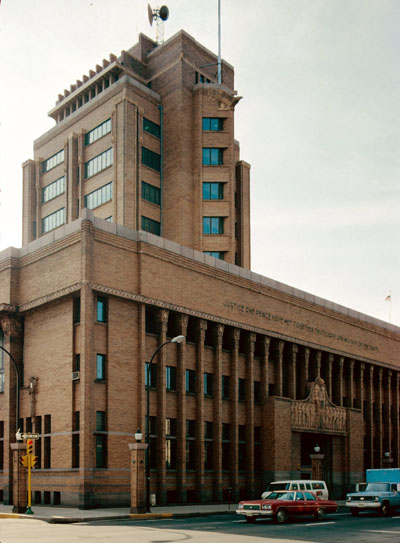
Woodbury County Courthouse, Iowa, by William L. Steele and Purcell and Elmslie (associate architects)

Prairie School is a late 19th and early 20th-century architectural style, most commonly seen in the Midwestern United States. The style is usually marked by horizontal lines, flat or hipped roofs with broad overhanging eaves, ribbon windows, integration with the landscape, and solid construction and craftsmanship. It reflects discipline in the use of ornament, which was often inspired by organic growth and seen carved into wood, stenciled on plaster, in colored glass, veined marble, and prints or paintings with a general prevalence of earthy, autumnal colors. Spaciousness and continuous horizontal lines were thought to evoke and relate to the wide, flat, treeless expanses of America's native prairie landscape, and decoration often depicted prairie wildlife, sometimes with indigenous materials contributing to a sense of the building belonging to the landscape.

The Prairie School sought to develop a distinct North American architectural style, distinguishing it from historical revivals that were popular at the time. It shared many ideals and design aesthetics of the Arts and Crafts Movement, though it embraced the machine and also shared ideals with modernist movements. Many architects were also part of the Chicago School, but Prairie School buildings were seen less in the commercial skyscrapers of Chicago and more in the suburban residences, though the style can be seen in throughout a variety of building types, including banks, schools, and churches. Japanese architecture and prints, interests of Frank Lloyd Wright in particular, inspired the focus on simplicity and openness in addition to the prairie landscape.

== History ==
The Prairie School was influenced by the Arts and Crafts movement, a decorative and fine arts movement led by John Ruskin, William Morris, and others in late 19th century England. Along with the kindred American Craftsman movement, it embraced handcrafting and craftsman guilds as a reaction against the new assembly line mass production manufacturing techniques, which were felt to create inferior products and dehumanize workers. A major arbiter of this link was Joseph Twyman, who moved from England to Chicago and promoted Morris's work and philosophy by writing papers and delivering lectures to the Chicago Architectural Club. Elements of this philosophy—such as a regard for the nature of a material—worked well with the Prairie School, but they embraced the machine, incorporating thoughtfulness and reflection in the design process alongside handicraft processes.

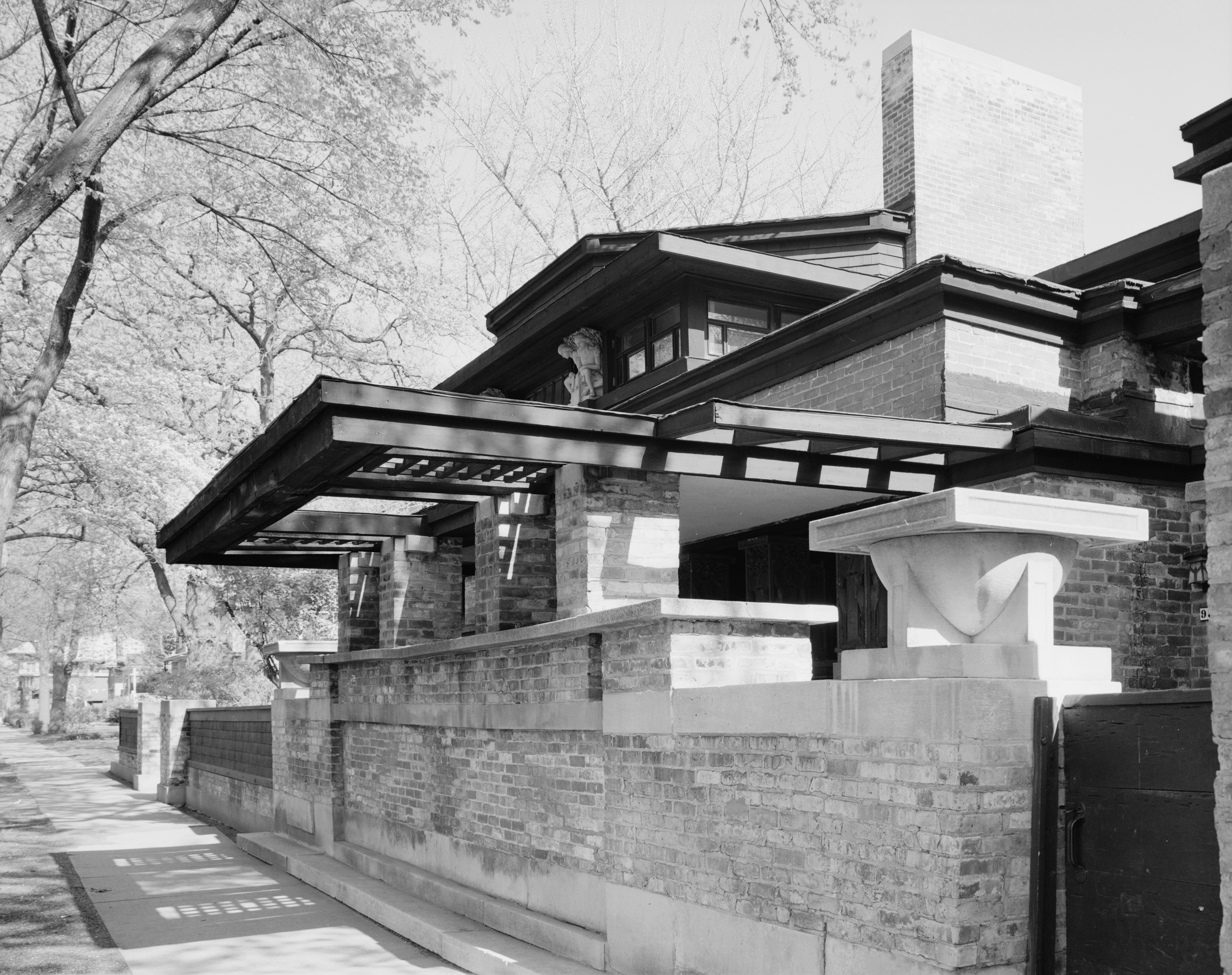
Chicago Avenue side of architect Frank Lloyd Wright's home and studio in Oak Park, Illinois, showing post-1911 changes to studio building

The World's Columbian Exposition (Chicago World's Fair) of 1893 aimed to herald the city's rebirth after the Great Chicago Fire of 1871. Unlike the Greek and Roman classicism widely seen in buildings at the fair, many of the Midwestern architects of what would become the Prairie School sought to create new work in and around Chicago that would display a uniquely modern and distinctly American architectural style inspired by the American landscape.

The name reflects the dominant horizontality of Prairie style buildings, which echoes the wide, flat, treeless expanses of the Midwestern United States. Author Wilhelm Miller may have been the first to coin "the prairie spirit in landscape gardening" in 1915 to refer to Midwestern landscape architecture that differed from European styles. The most famous proponent of the style, Frank Lloyd Wright, promoted an idea of "organic architecture", asserting that a structure should look as if it naturally grew from the site; in Wright's words, buildings that appeared as if they were "married to the ground". Wright also felt that a horizontal orientation was a distinctly American design motif since the younger country had much more open land than many highly urbanized European nations.

The University of Illinois was the second institution offering a formal college degree in architecture after the Massachusetts Institute of Technology. Professor Nathan C. Ricker believed that students learned by doing and, being exposed to different architectural practices such as theater design, developed a cultural and technical understanding of architecture, which could help overcome the limitations of formal academic study and foster a sense of design. Early graduates like Clarence Blackall, Joseph Llewellyn, and Henry Bacon followed the more popular academic approach and historicist design aesthetic, but later graduates like William Drummond, William L. Steele, and Walter Burley Griffin contributed to the emerging Prairie School style. Ideas were shared by and with Prairie School architects in the Architectural League of America and the Chicago Architectural Club. These professional networks were important to architects' learning and development; their value was reflected by Sullivan's ideas in the essay collection Kindergarten Chats, devaluing formal education and lauding mentorship in architectural education. At a Chicago convention in 1900, Sullivan spoke about the power of mental logic and the study of nature to inspire stylish and logical buildings. One League convention introduced the idea of pure design – composing a building by analyzing parts that could be expressed as simple geometric shapes – to Wright, who incorporated the idea into his designs. Inspired by Sullivan's ornamental geometry, Elmslie featured the hexagon in Thornton Fractional Township High School (Calumet City, 1934–35) and the Thomas A. Edison School (Hammond, 1935–37), Wright highlighted the hexagon in the Hanna House ("honeycomb house, Palo Alto, California, 1936), and Griffin used the octagon in Northern Illinois University's campus. Prairie School architects Wright, Elmslie, and Maher worked for Joseph Silsbee, who instilled a sense of informality, irregularity, and complexity through planning and rough, organic surfaces in these architects, Wright especially, giving a picturesque and dynamic quality to the Prairie School style.

By the early 1920s, "Tudor and Mediterranean Revivals became popular for suburban homes and shopping districts, and Georgian was favored for large city houses; even the middle-class Arts and Crafts bungalow had been dipped in Renaissance or Spanish Colonial frosting. Church and university architects employed the academic Gothic of Ralph Adams Cram” (p. 544). The Prairie School was in conversation with other modernist movements like Art Nouveau, Bauhaus, Expressionism, and Constructivism.

Architectural historian H. Allen Brooks identified works built in or before 1902 as being part of "the Sullivan Phase," – emphasizing simplification, structured ornament, and a new uniquely American architecture – buildings built from 1902–1909 as the "Wrightian" phase – spanning from when Wright reached maturity as an architect to his departure from Oak Park to Europe, rural Wisconsin, California, and Japan – and the Prairie School's full maturity in 1909–1914/16. Professors Richard Guy Wilson and Sidney K. Robinson divide Prairie School periods into the style that spread from the Chicago area from the late 1890s to the late 1920s, and a post-hiatus-Wright-led era of creativity on a more national scale from the mid-1930s on, including the "Usonian" house.

== Architects and designers ==
The Prairie School is mostly associated with a generation of architects employed or influenced by Wright or Sullivan. While the style originated in Chicago, some Prairie School architects spread its influence well beyond the Midwest, like Barry Byrne's church designs in Europe and Mahony's and Griffin's work in Australia and India. A Prairie School work considered harmony with interior decor and landscape architecture as part of the total design, so some architects, like Wright, also designed interiors, and sometimes partnered with craftspeople like Richard Walter Bock. A partial list of Prairie School architects and designers includes:

- Percy Dwight Bentley
- John S. Van Bergen
- Parker N. Berry
- Richard Walter Bock
- Lawrence Buck
- Ransom Buffalow
- Barry Byrne
- Alfred Caldwell
- Arthur A. Carrara
- Louis W. Claude
- William Drummond
- George Grant Elmslie
- Hugh M. G. Garden
- Marion Mahony Griffin
- Walter Burley Griffin
- Arthur Heun
- John H. Howe
- Jens Jensen
- Henry John Klutho
- George Washington Maher
- Mason Maury
- John Randal McDonald
- Otto A. Merman
- George Mann Niedecken (Interior)
- Thomas Olson
- Dwight Heald Perkins
- William Gray Purcell
- Purcell, Feick and Elmslie
- Eben E. Roberts
- Isabel Roberts
- Richard E. Schmidt
- Robert C. Spenser, Jr.
- Claude and Starck
- William LaBarthe Steele
- Francis Conroy Sullivan
- Taliesin associated architects
- Thomas E. Tallmadge
- Trost & Trost
- Vernon S. Watson
- Andrew Willatzen
- Taylor Woolley
- Frank Lloyd Wright
- Lloyd Wright

== Influences ==
Prairie School architecture is characterized by open floor plans creating a sense of spaciousness, continuous horizontal lines punctuated by short vertical accents, and indigenous materials together contributing to a sense of the building belonging to the landscape. These were related to the American Arts and Crafts movement and its emphasis on hand craftsmanship, simplicity, and function. Both were alternatives to the then-dominant Classical Revival Style of Greco-Roman forms. The Arts and Crafts movement led to a medieval cottage revival in England, but the Prairie School embraced modernity more. Some firms, such as Purcell & Elmslie, which accepted the honest presence of machine worked surfaces, consciously rejected the term "Arts and Crafts" for their work. The Prairie School was also influenced by the Idealistic Romantics who believed better homes would create better people, and the Transcendentalist philosophy of Ralph Waldo Emerson in its focus on nature. Architecturally, horizontal continuity and spatial openness were seen in the earlier shingle style, elements like overhanging eaves and horizontal accents of leaded windows were seen in the Queen Anne style, and the proportions and open plans were similar to bungalows. Prairie School houses often adhered to the suburban ethos of the centering of a single family household through attention to spaces like dining rooms and fireplaces where family could gather. Existing mainly in suburbs, the prairie is alluded to as a symbol of the history of the setting, not something that was always visible and surrounding the houses.

Many Prairie School architects were influenced by Louis Sullivan, who was part of the Chicago School. His lessons that form follows function, that artists humanize modern materials and techniques, and that rhythm was an important aspect of design are integral to the Prairie School. Maher, Irving Pond, Garden, Spencer, and Elmslie wrote about the concept of rhythm in architecture, and Maher developed the "motive-rhythm theory," about a work as a composition guided by a motif. They generally believed that historical styles arose naturally from the sprit of their settings and therefore rejected historical revivalism. Elmslie wrote that architecture should be inspired by its specific local context, in contrast to the International Style that he saw as cold and impersonal. Architects also designed for practicality in their regional setting; the low shape helps maintain temperature and the overhangs protect from sun and snow piling. Early Prairie Style houses omitted attics and cellars to enhance the low proportions, and the Usonian house of the late 1930s went farther to reduce extra space above, below, and between key spaces.

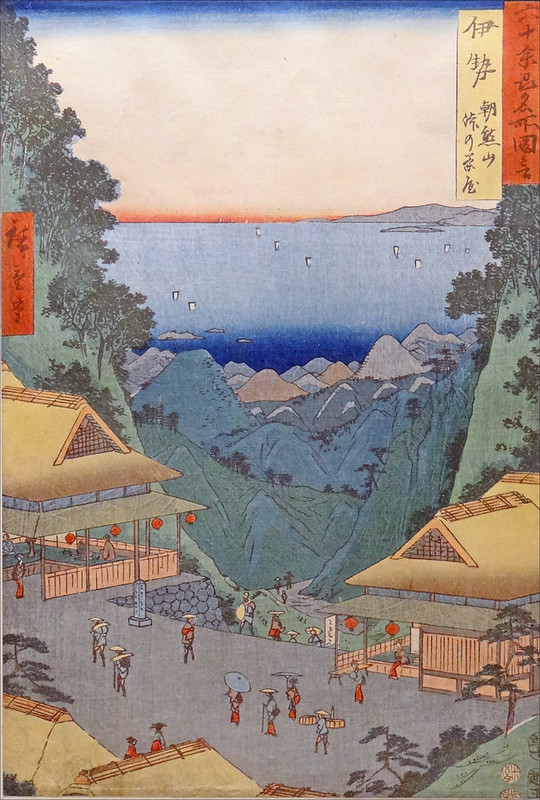
Ise Province: Mount Asama, Teahouse on the Mountain Pass, from the series Famous Places in the Sixty-odd Provinces, Utagawa Hiroshige, 1853: Japanese prints and architecture influenced the Prairie School's sense of space, decorative style, and integration with nature

The Midwest influenced the prairie-like forms and natural imagery in Prairie School designs, and also provided a unique context philosophically. Unlike the East Coast, which had stronger European cultural ties, the Midwest could be more intuitively inspired by itself. Designers looked to the form of the prairie, local wildlife, indigenous American art, and the philosophy that the prairie "represented newness, and a sense of experimentation, like a broad, unwritten page”. The rhetoric of prosperity represented by the prairie also resonated well with banks, a major type of Prairie School building. The sense of openness and attention to nature were also influenced by Japanese architecture and ukiyo-e prints, which Prairie School figures like Wright and Marion Mahoney Griffin studied. The Midwest's contrasting industrial and rural landscapes may also have influenced the Prairie School's acceptance of machine production alongside natural forms and images.

== Reception ==
The Prairie School was one of many international movements toward architectural modernism, sharing philosophies of "form following function," the "less is more" ethos of Minimalists, emphasis on the structure and its building materials, and other elements seen in Bauhaus, Expressionist, and Constructivist architecture. Like many movements in arts and architecture, it was not initially well-loved. Architect Montgomery Schuyler wrote in the Architectural Record in 1912 that Wright's style had not fully matured and that his buildings felt incomplete. Magazine the Western Architect published in 1911 that, "None have...failed to signally in the production of livable houses as Frank Lloyd Wright," but by 1915, more than 50% of the Western Architect's pages highlighted the Prairie School and featured issues devoted to Purcell and Elsmlie, Guenzel and Drummond, Van Bergen, and Tallmadge and Watson –though never Wright.

The success and acceptance of Prairie School architecture was influenced by the popularity of bungalows and homemaker magazines in the growing suburban culture. The magazine House Beautiful published the first two articles written about Wright and gave the Prairie School much positive publicity, providing approval for respectability in these modern style homes instead of historical revivals. Wright helped distinguish the Prairie School single-family house by making it less like a box, opening it up and out to nature. The lack of expensive ornament and historical European influence seen more in the Eastern United States appealed to the "common sense" proclivities of Midwesterners. The Great Depression moved people to value the stability of land ownership over the instability of urban life, while the increased prevalence of the automobile enabled suburban growth.

The longevity of the Prairie style may be partly due to its ability to blend with other styles, such as the house for the seed merchant Salzer, built in 1912, to accommodate Mrs. Salzer's preference for colonial style, and the D.S. Brown house in Peoria, Illinois which accommodated Mrs. Brown's preference for a traditional design. By the 1920s, Prairie School houses became more common beyond the suburbs of Chicago and into more rural parts of the Midwest.

Architectural historians have debated why the Prairie School fell out of favor by the mid-1920s. In her autobiography, Prairie School architect Marion Mahony suggests:

The enthusiastic and able young men as proved in their later work were doubtless as influential in the office later as were these early ones but Wright's early concentration on publicity and his claims that everybody was his disciple had a deadening influence on the Chicago group and only after a quarter of a century do we find creative architecture conspicuously evident in the United States.

The intuitive nature of Midwestern sensibilities lessened at this point and were marred by a desire for conformity and a sense of inferiority to the Eastern United States. Prairie School architects used to be commissioned for buildings with an individualist sense of identity and place, but this desire was replaced by one for conformity. Peter B. Wight noted in 1905 the way Midwestern clients lacked the same level of interest in historical revivals than Eastern clients, but that in 1915 that colonial style architecture had become sought after in the Midwest. The first World War had increased patriotism and sympathy for England that contributed to the interest in colonial and other historical revival styles. The architects at the time cited women's – wives' and daughters' – desire to be fashionable and conform to architectural trends like Colonial Revival as a cause for the decline of the Prairie School. This was expressed by Tallmadge and Byrne at the time and echoed by Brooks in the 1970s. By the late 1920s, the Prairie School architects had informally disbanded, working on other types of projects or adapting their styles in ways that didn't contribute to the wider movement of "the Prairie School," sharing common ideals like they used to. Wright especially moved on higher-profile projects and expressed an attitude toward other architects "stealing his ideas," (p. 235) and doing a poor job generally.

The Prairie School lost popularity between the World Wars, when the vales of conformity overtook those of individual expression, and when attention and sympathy were focused on Europe. Interest renewed after 1945, "when public taste again favored a low, small-scale, anti-monumental architecture, an architecture rooted in the earth," (p. 348) but by then the architects and their influences had died or dispersed. Elements of the style live on in the more recent popularity of ranch-style houses – both designing for a sense of spaciousness as smaller homes became economically necessary.

== Buildings ==
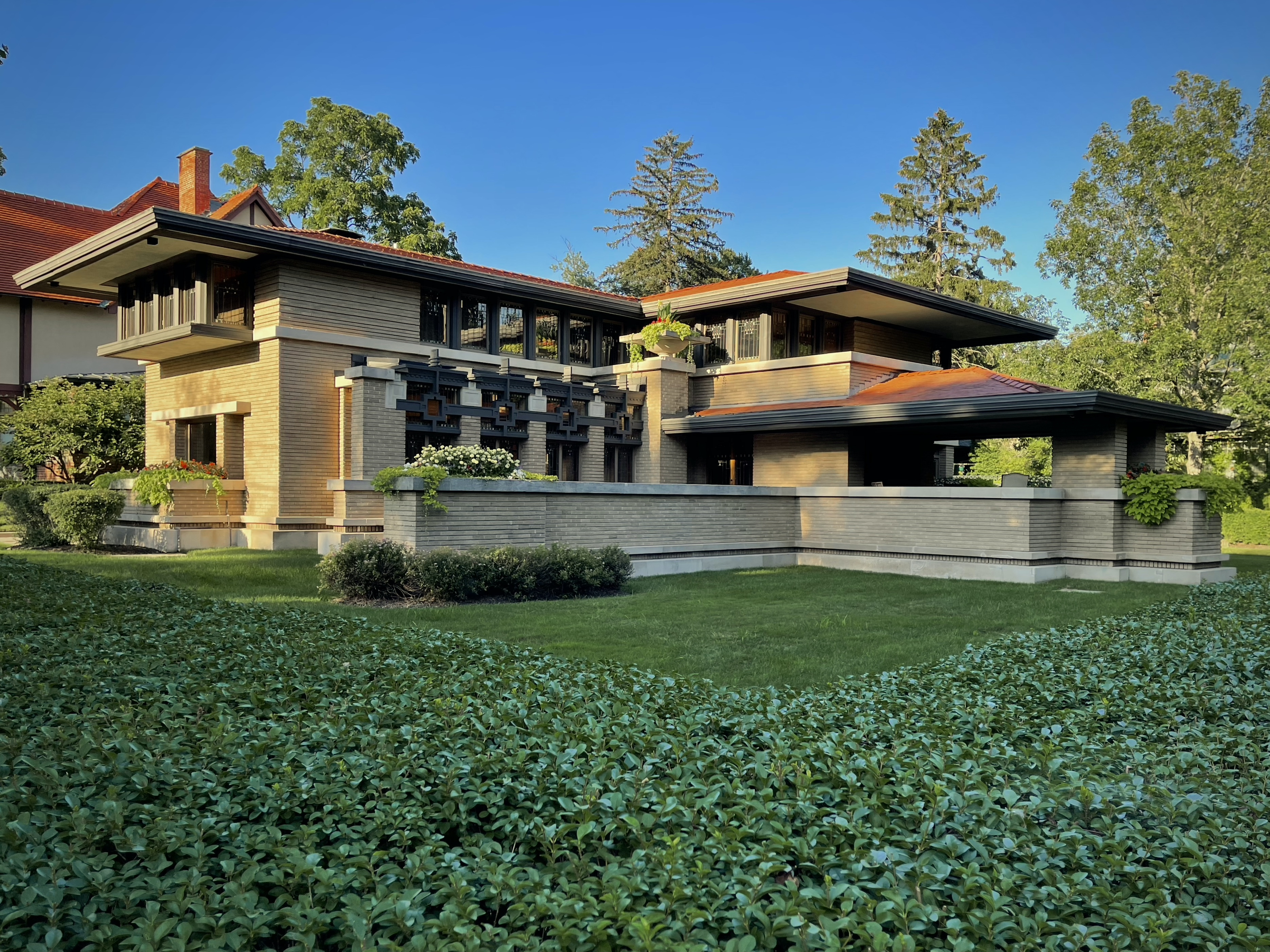
The Meyer May House in Grand Rapids, Michigan. Built between 1908 and 1909, this Frank Lloyd Wright-designed home is considered "Michigan's Prairie masterpiece."

Frank Lloyd Wright's Wisconsin home and estate, Taliesin, was designated as a National Historic Landmark in 1976 and a UNESCO World Heritage Site in 2019. The aptly named "The Prairie School," a private day school in Racine, Wisconsin, designed by Taliesin Associates (an architectural firm originated by Wright), and located almost adjacent to Wright's Wingspread Conference Center, exemplifies Prairie School architecture. Mahony's and Griffin's work in Australia and India, notably the collection of homes at Castlecrag, New South Wales, and Barry Byrne's churches in Europe demonstrate the Prairie School’s reach far from its Chicago roots, using the philosophy in different contexts. Isabel Roberts' Veterans' Memorial Library in St. Cloud, Florida, is another. The House at 8 Berkley Drive at Lockport, New York was listed on the National Register of Historic Places in 2009.

The Oak Circle Historic District in Wilmette, Illinois primarily consists of fifteen single-family homes representative of the Prairie School and Craftsman styles constructed between 1917 and 1929. The Oak Circle Historic District was added to the National Register of Historic Places on June 21, 2001; it was the first historic district to be designated in Wilmette. The Rock Crest–Rock Glen Historic District in Mason City, Iowa, designed by Walter Burley Griffin and Marion Mahoney Griffith circa 1912, was listed on the National Register of Historic Places in 1979. All of the houses part of a planned development and adjacent commercial buildings – The Historic Park Inn Hotel and City National Bank – were designed in the Prairie School style. Completed in 1910, the Historic Park Inn Hotel is the last remaining Wright-designed hotel in the world, of the six for which he was the architect of record. The Dr. G.C. Stockman House is another example of Wright's Prairie School style found in Mason City. Built in 1908, the Stockman House was the first Wright-designed Prairie School-style house in Iowa. Today, the house functions as a museum welcoming visitors and architectural enthusiasts from all around the world. A partial list of Prairie School buildings includes:

- McDermott House, Glencoe, Illinois, 1928 – Barry Byrne
- Christ the King, Cork, Ireland, 1928–1931 – Byrne
- First Congregational Church, Chicago, Illinois, 1908 – William E. Drummond
- William E. Drummond's house, River Forest, Illinois, 1910 – Drummond
- Rock Crest–Rock Glen Historic District – Walter Burley Griffin and Marion Mahoney Griffin
- William H. Emery Jr. House, 1903 – Walter Burley Griffin
- Frederick Carter House, Evanston, Illinois, 1910 – Griffin
- J. G. Melson house, Mason City, Iowa, 1912 – Griffin
- Stinson Memorial Library, Anna, Illinois, 1913–14 – Griffin
- Morocco Temple, Jacksonville, Florida, 1910 – Henry John Klutho
- First Reformed Church, Toledo, Ohio, 1900s – Langdon and Hohly, architects
- House at 8 Berkley Drive – Duane Lyman
- James A. Patten house, Evanston, Illinois, 1901 – George W. Maher
- Henry Schultz House, Winnetka, Illinois, 1907 – Maher
- The Kenilworth Club entrance, Kenilworth, Illinois, 1907 – Maher
- Cafe Brauer, Chicago, Illinois, 1908, – Dwight Heald Perkins
- House in LaSalle, Illinois – Irving K. Pond and Allen B. Pond
- Merchants National Bank, Winona, Minnesota, 1912, – Purcell and Elmslie
- Purcell House, Minneapolis, Minnesota, 1913 – Purcell and Elmslie
- Parish House, First Congregational Church, Eau Claire, Wisconsin, 1913 – Purcell and Elmslie
- Veterans' Memorial Library – Isabel Roberts
- August Magnus house, Winnetka, Illinois, 1905 – Robert C. Spencer, Jr.
- Teller's Wicket from the National Farmers Bank, Owatonna, Minnesota – Louis Sullivan
- The Prairie School – Taliesin Associates
- Vernon Watson House, Oak Park, Illinois, 1904 – Vernon S. Watson
- Avery Coonley Playhouse, Riverside, Illinois, 1912 – Frank Lloyd Wright
- Taliesin – Wright
- The Historic Park Inn Hotel and City National Bank – Wright
- Dr. G.C. Stockman House – Wright
- Meyer May House, Grand Rapids, Michigan, 1908–1909 – Wright
- Ward Willits House, Highland Park, Illinois, 1901 – Wright
- Darwin Martin House, Buffalo, New York, 1903–1905 – Wright
- Robie House, Chicago, Illinois, 1908 – Wright
- Unity Temple, Oak Park, Illinois, 1905–1908 – Wright
- Larkin Administration Building, Buffalo, New York, 1906 – Wright
- Monona Terrace Community and Convention Center, Madison, Wisconsin, 1938 – Wright
- Herbert F. Johnson House, (Wingspread), Wind Point, Wisconsin, 1939 – Wright

== Modern interest ==
Prairie School architecture exemplifies changes in both the fields of fine arts and cultural history in the early 20th century. Interest in the ideas and designs of the Prairie School artists and architects has grown since the late 1980s, thanks in part to celebrity collecting and high-profile auction results on many of the decorative designs from buildings of the era. In addition to numerous books, magazine articles, videos and merchandise promoting the movement, a number of original Prairie School building sites have become public museums, open for tours and special interactive events. National Historic Landmark and UNESCO World Heritage Site, Frank Lloyd Wright's Wisconsin home and estate, Taliesin, remains a popular tourist destination near Spring Green, Wisconsin, as well as a Frank Lloyd Wright Trail guiding visitors to notable cites. Several not-for-profit organizations and online communities have been formed to educate people about the Prairie School movement and help preserve the designs associated with it. Some of these organizations and sites are listed in the External links section below.

== Gallery ==
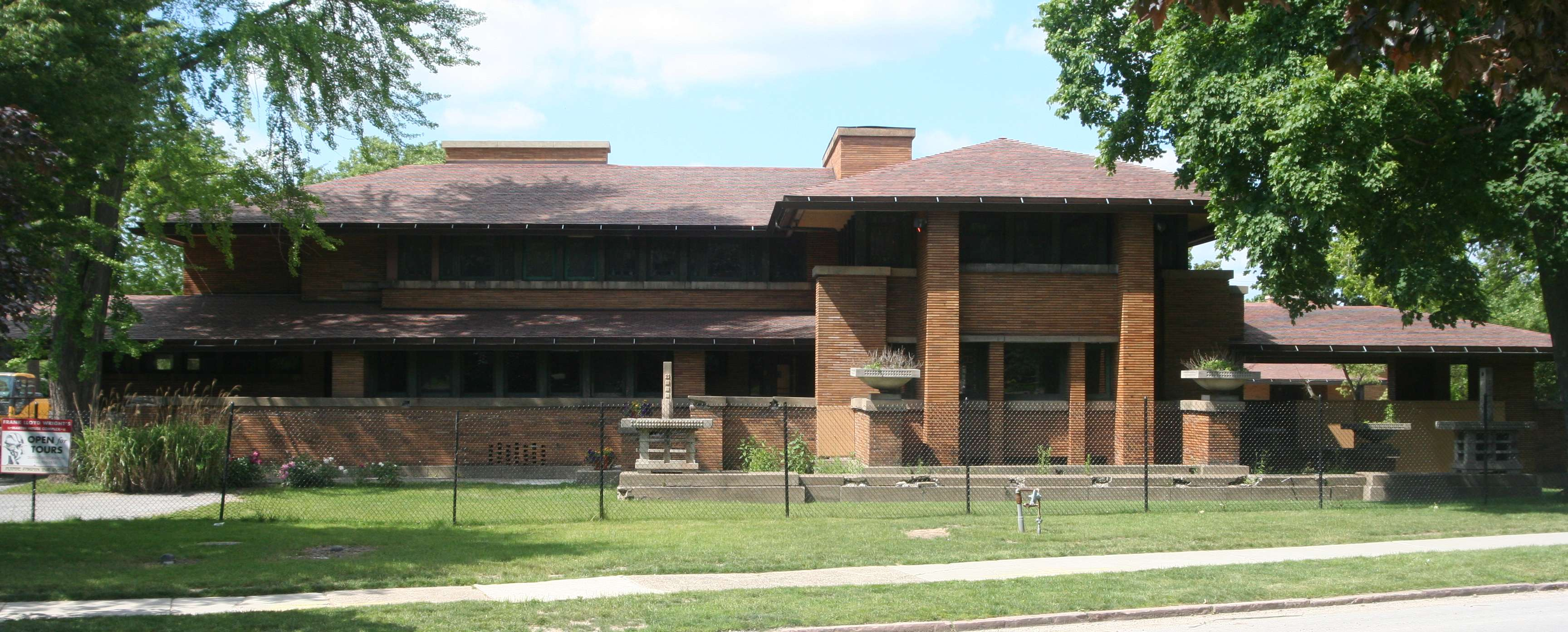
The Darwin Martin House, Buffalo, New York, 1903–1905, Frank Lloyd Wright

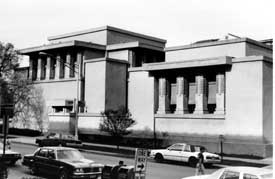
Unity Temple, Oak Park, Illinois, 1905–1908, Frank Lloyd Wright

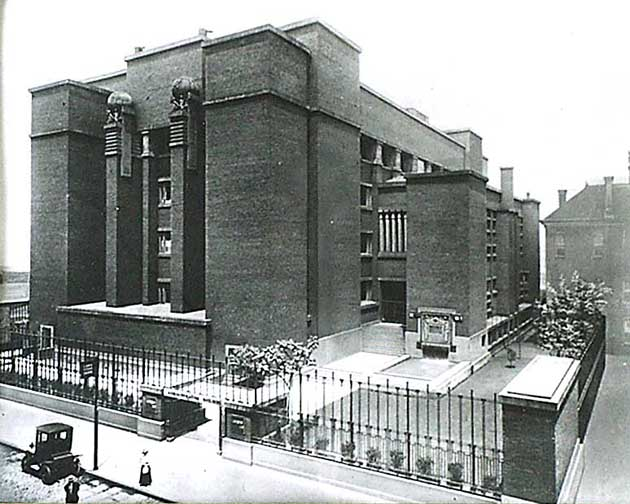
Larkin Administration Building, Buffalo, New York, 1906, Frank Lloyd Wright

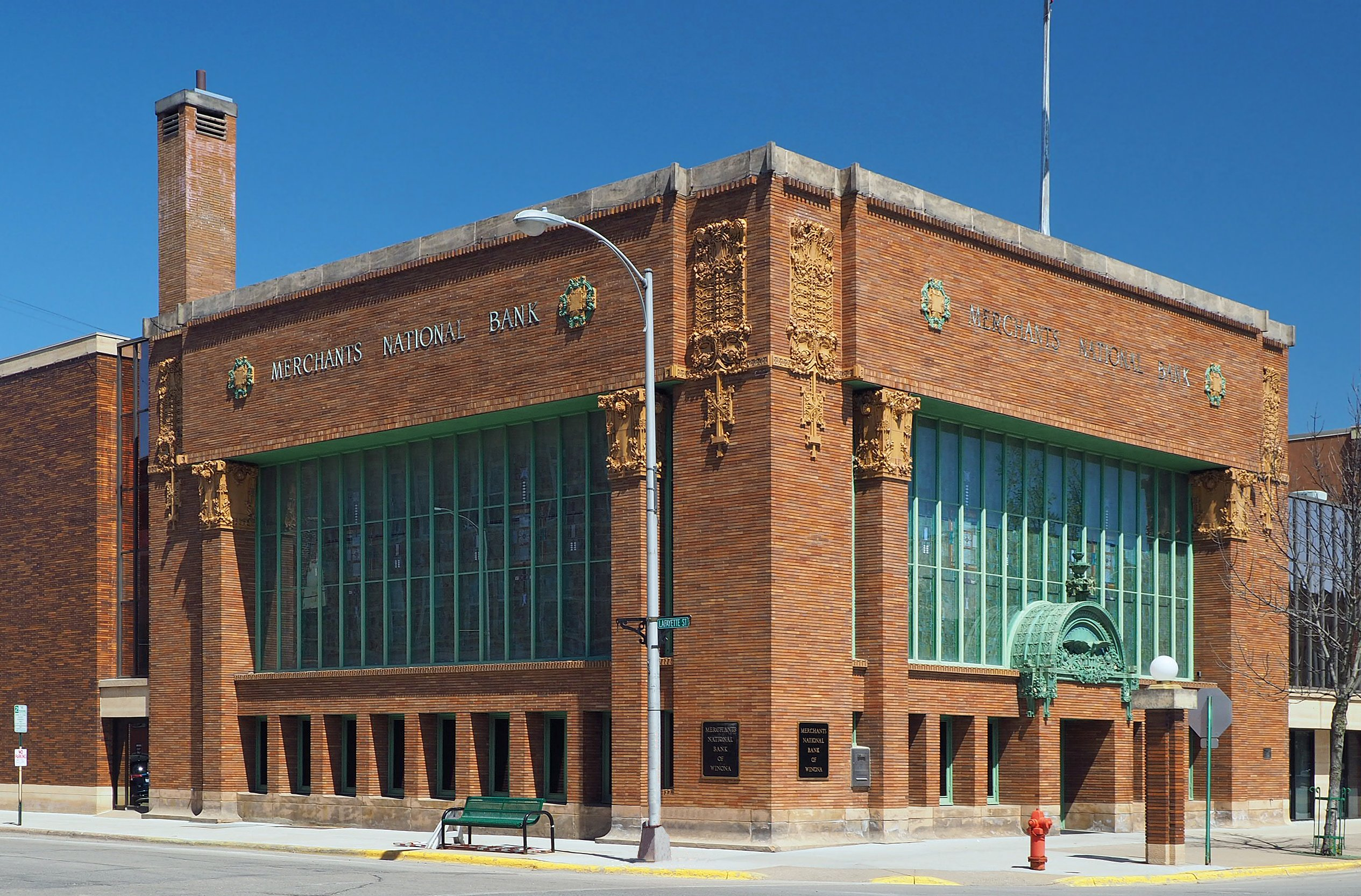
Merchants National Bank, Winona, Minnesota, 1912, Purcell and Elmslie

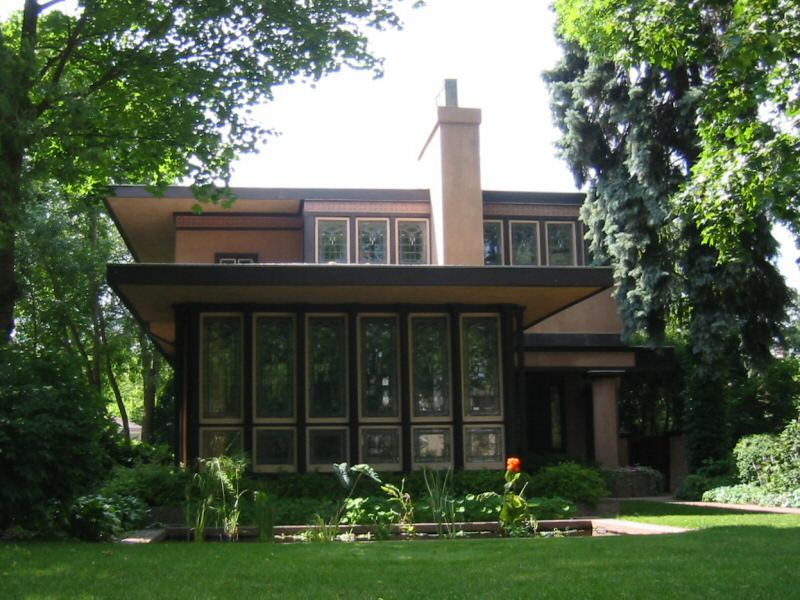
Purcell House, Minneapolis, Minnesota, 1913, Purcell and Elmslie

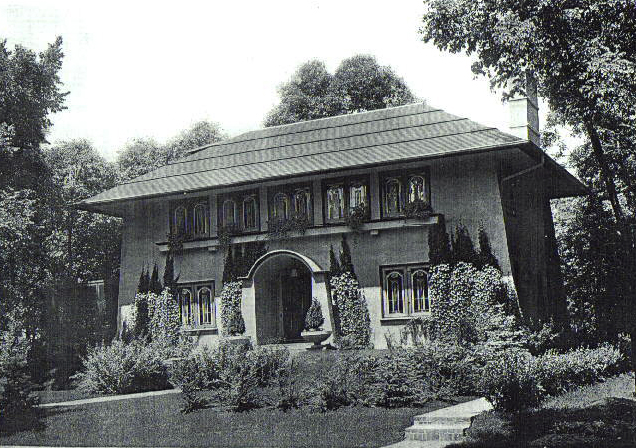
Henry Schultz House, Winnetka, Illinois, 1907, George W. Maher

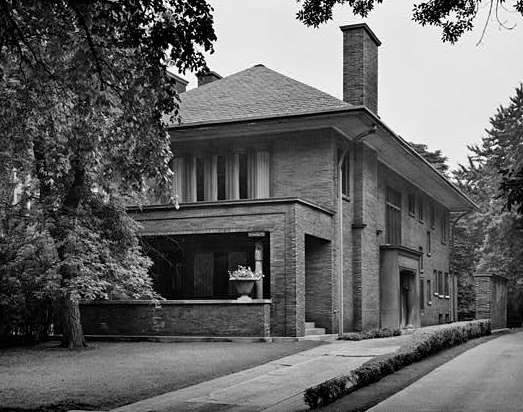
The Ernest J. Magerstadt House, Chicago, Illinois, 1908, George W. Maher

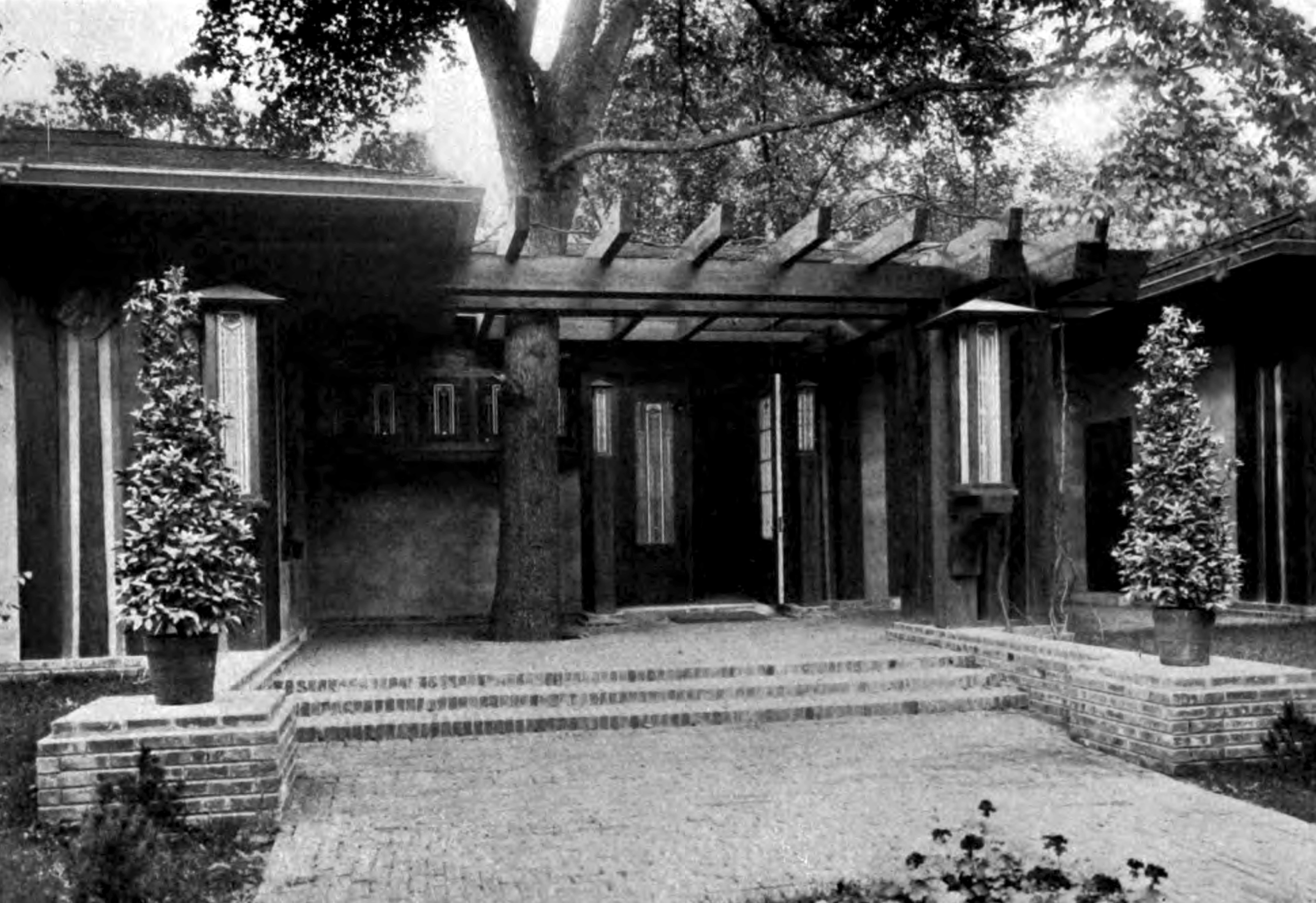
The Kenilworth Club entrance, Kenilworth, Illinois, 1907, George W. Maher

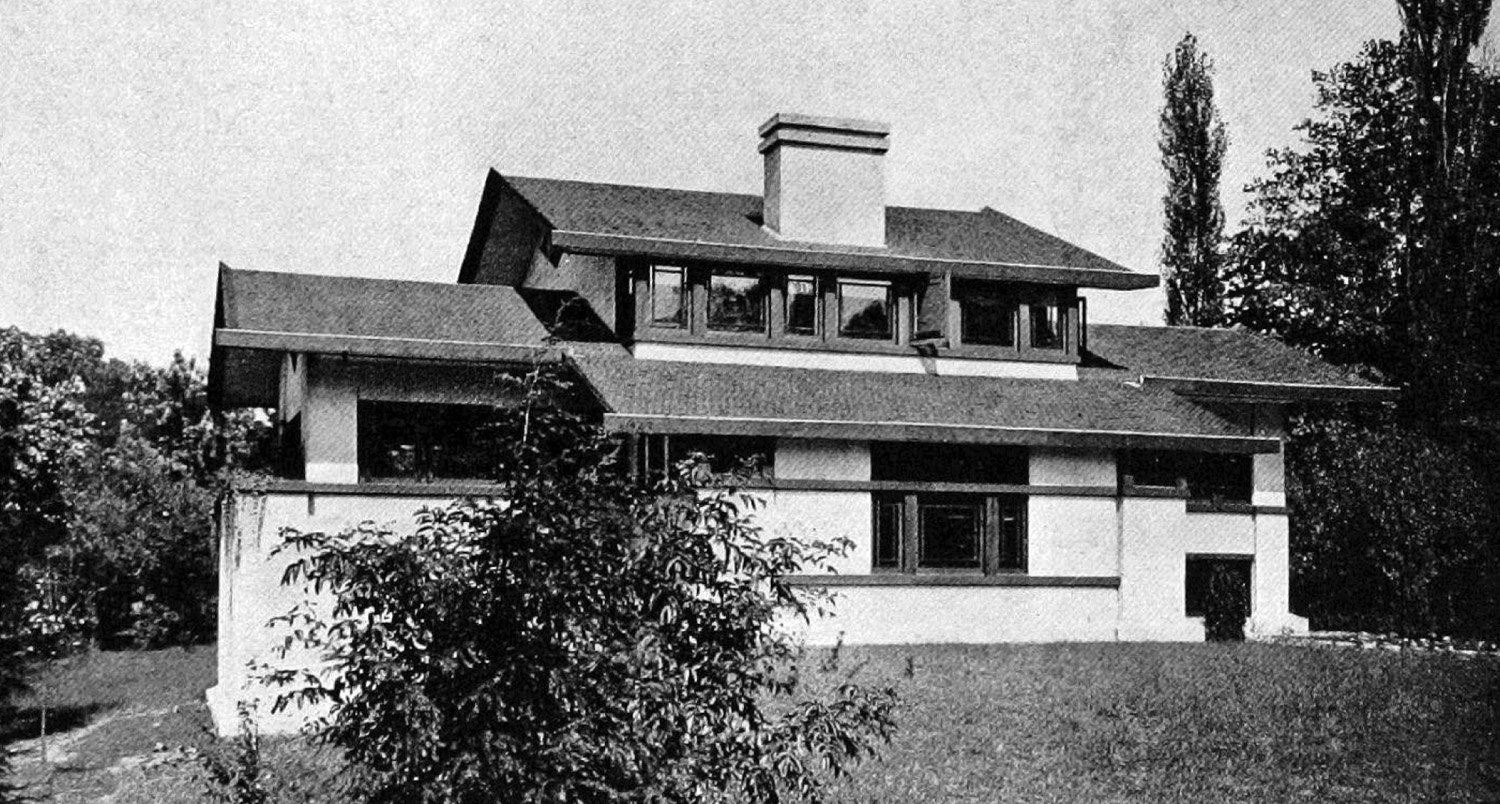
Ralph Griffin House, Edwardsville, Illinois, 1913, Walter Burley Griffin

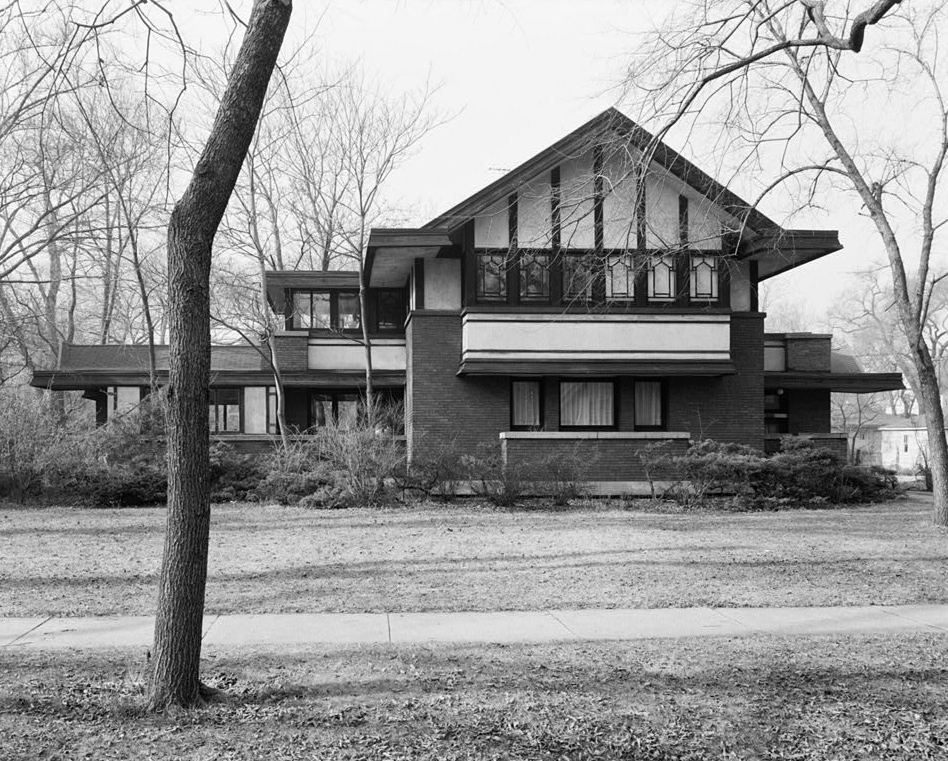
Frederick Carter House, Evanston, Illinois, 1910, Walter Burley Griffin

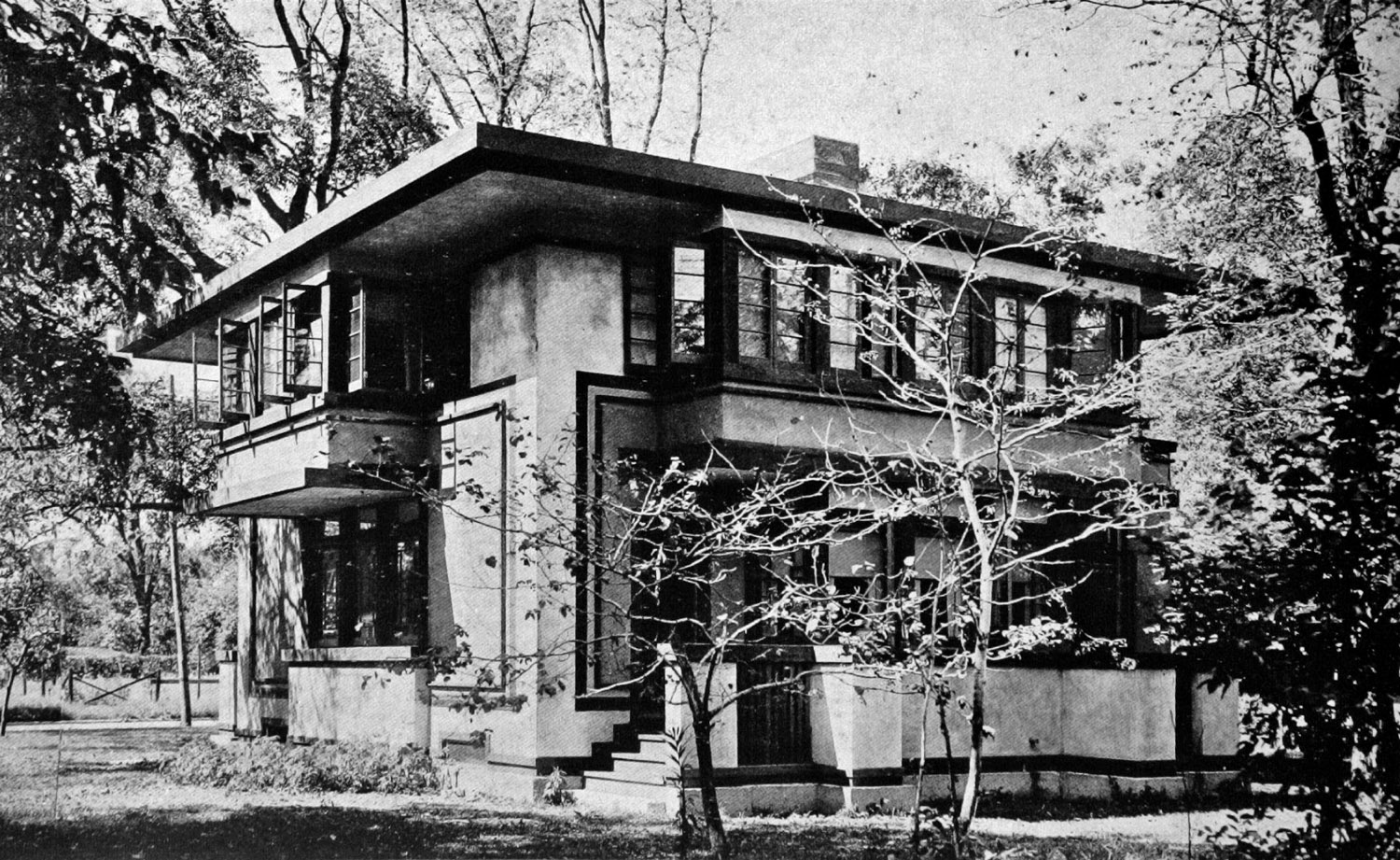
Architect William E. Drummond's own house, River Forest, Illinois, 1910

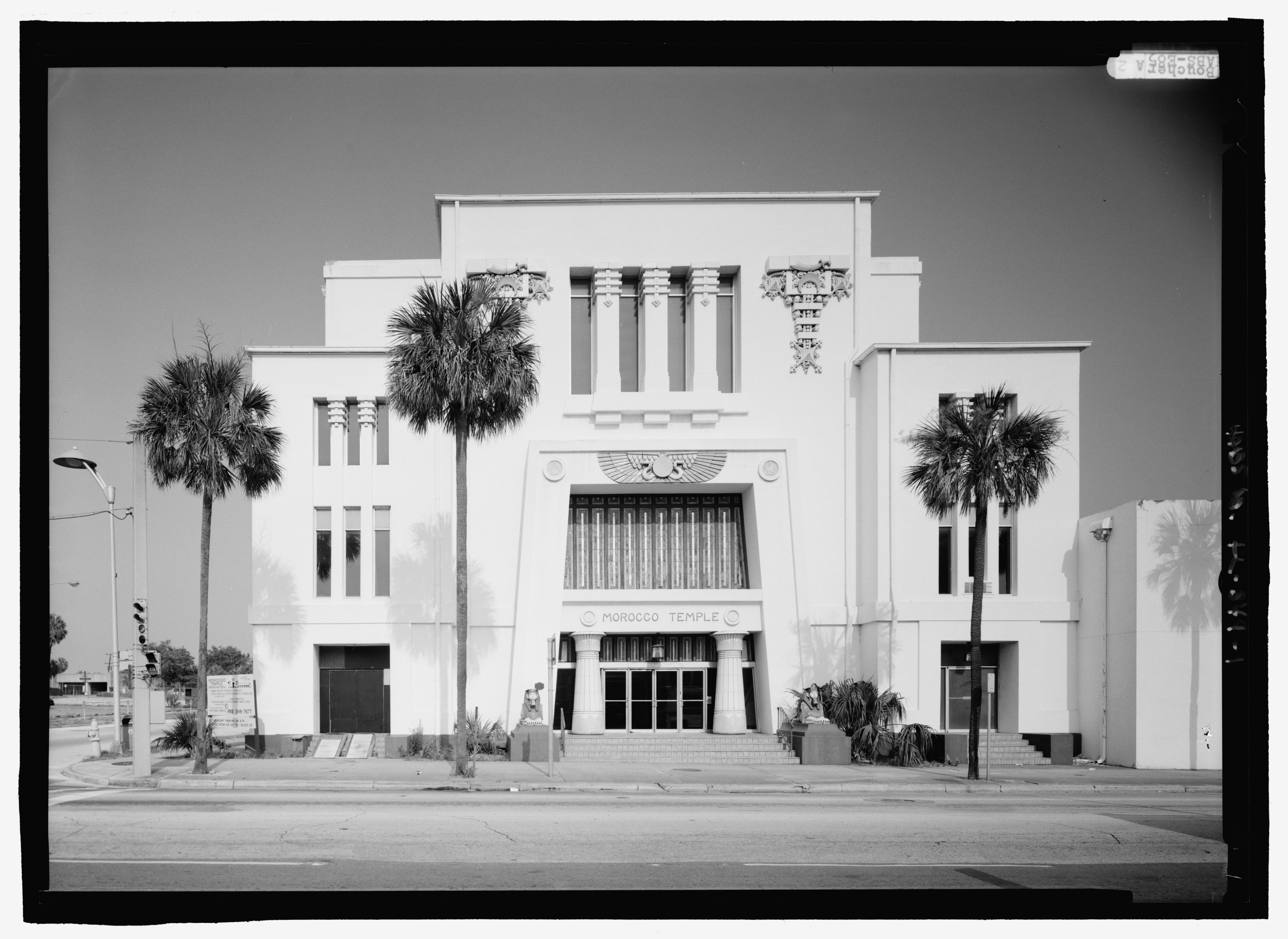
Morocco Temple, Jacksonville, Florida, 1910, Henry John Klutho

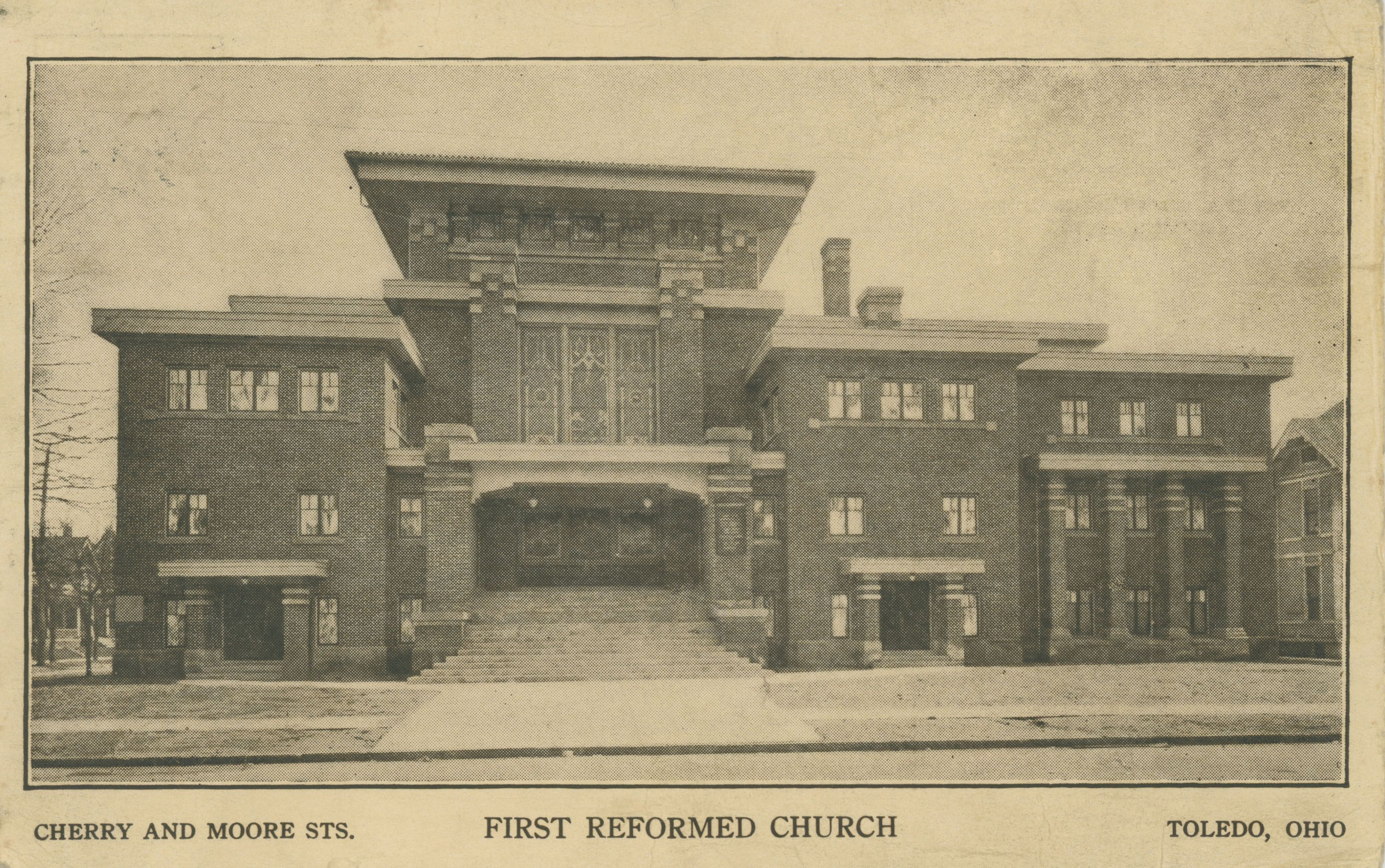
First Reformed Church, Toledo, Ohio, 1900s, Langdon and Hohly, architects

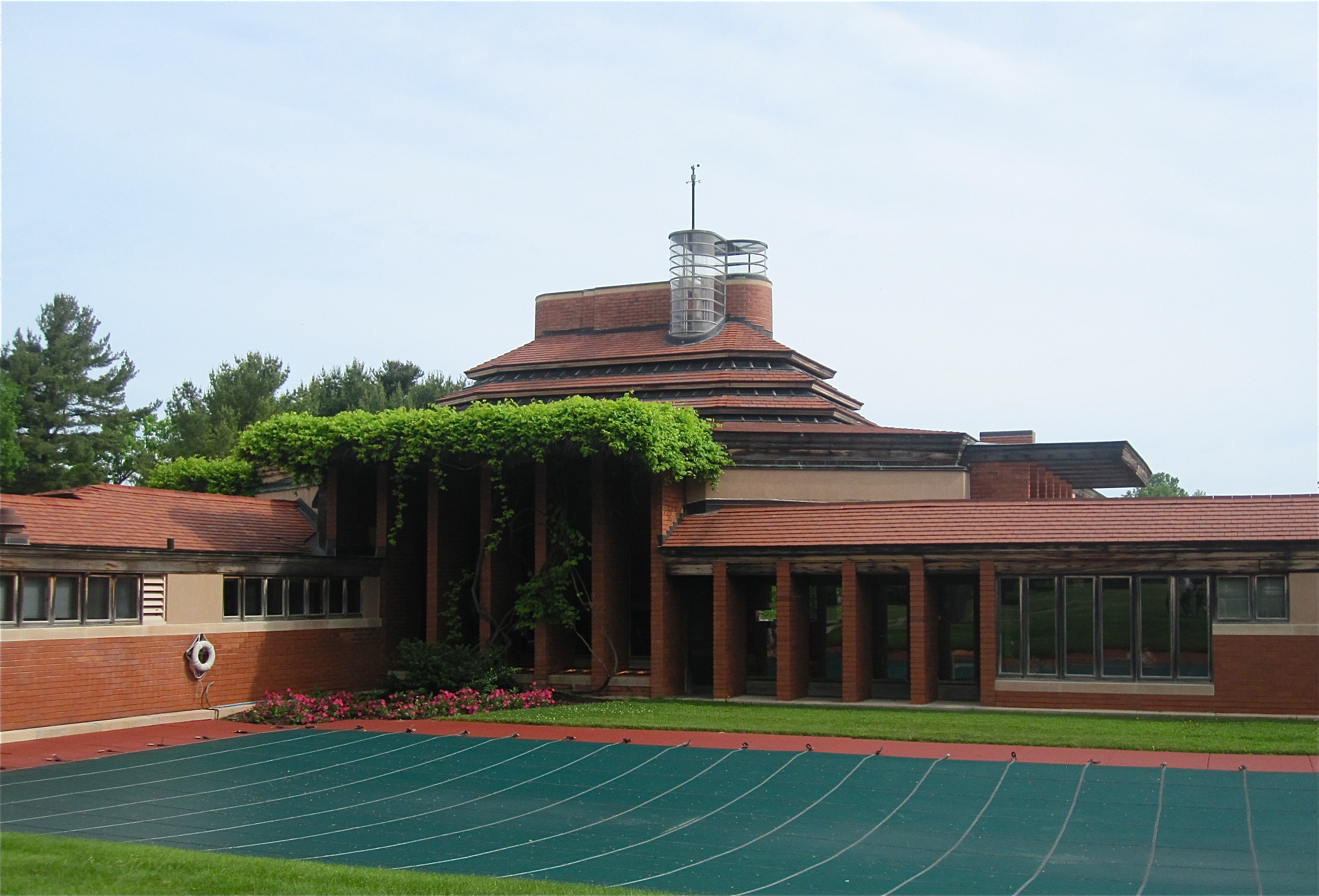
Herbert F. Johnson House, (Wingspread), Wind Point, Wisconsin, 1939, Frank Lloyd Wright.

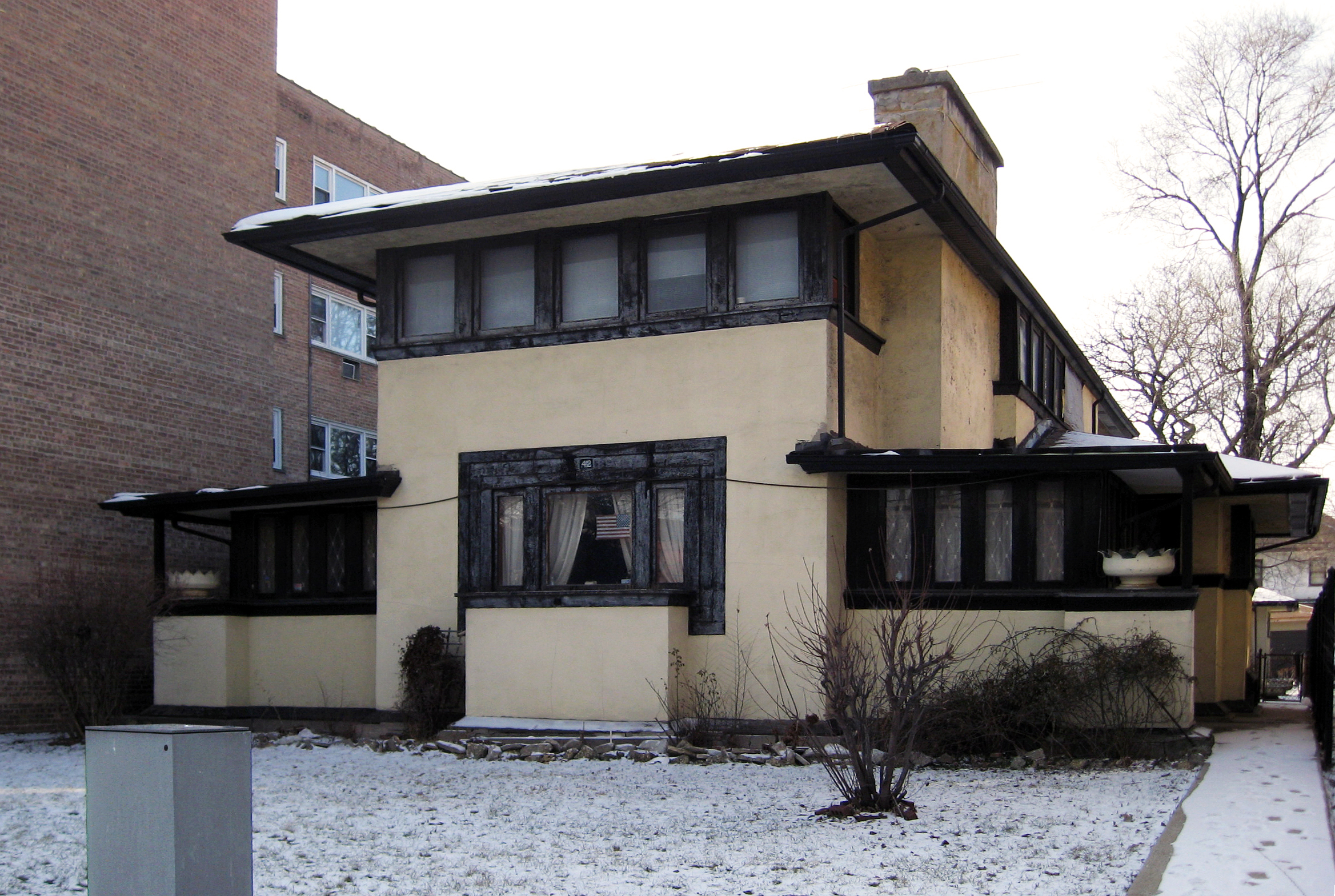
J. J. Walser Jr. House, Chicago, Illinois, 1903, Frank Lloyd Wright

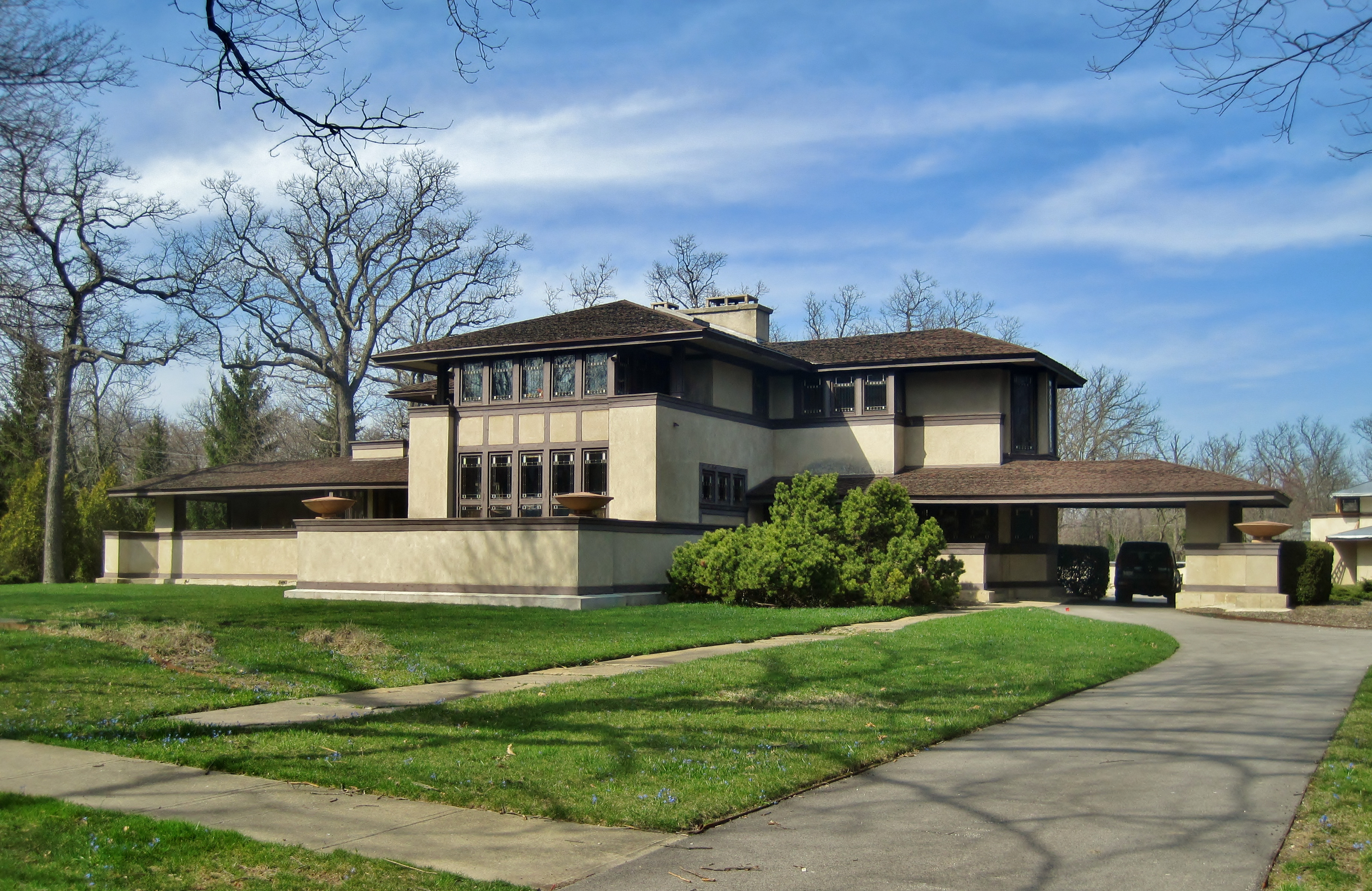
Ward Willits House, Highland Park, Illinois, 1901, one of the first Prairie Houses by Frank Lloyd Wright

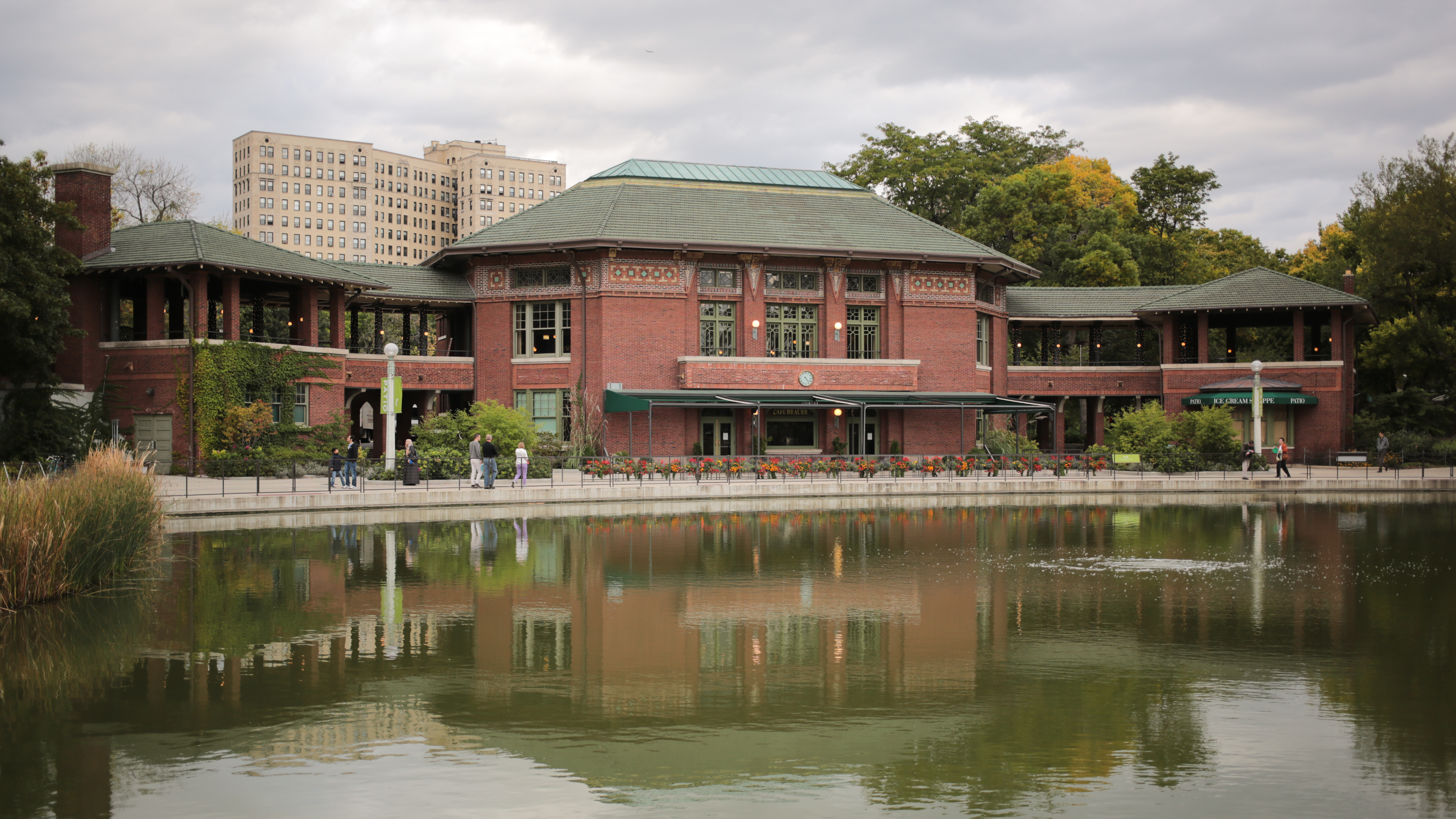
Cafe Brauer, Chicago, Illinois, 1908, Dwight Heald Perkins

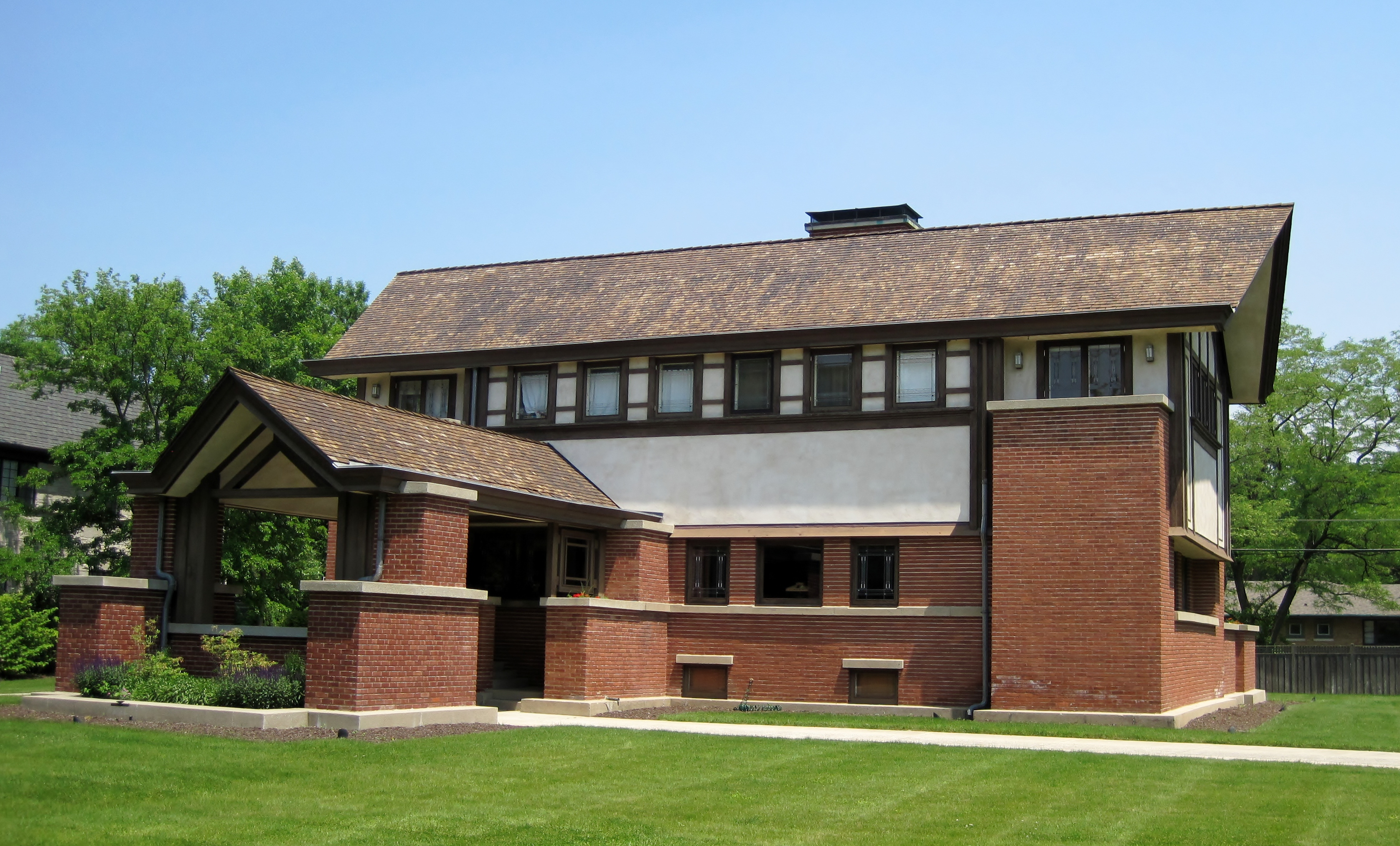
William H. Emery Jr. House, 1903, Walter Burley Griffin

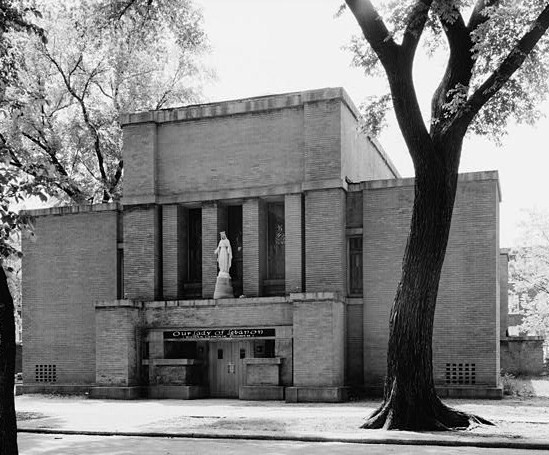
First Congregational Church, Chicago, Illinois, 1908, William E. Drummond

== See also ==
- Hartington City Hall and Auditorium
- List of Frank Lloyd Wright works
- The Menninger Clinic, Houston, Texas
- St. John's African Methodist Episcopal Church
- The Villa District, Chicago

== General and cited references ==
- Brooks, H. Allen, Frank Lloyd Wright and the Prairie School, Braziller (in association with the Cooper-Hewitt Museum), New York 1984; ISBN 0-8076-1084-4
- Brooks, H. Allen, The Prairie School, W.W. Norton, New York 2006; ISBN 0-393-73191-X
- Brooks, H. Allen (editor), Prairie School Architecture: Studies from "The Western Architect", University of Toronto Press, Toronto, Buffalo 1975; ISBN 0-8020-2138-7
- Brooks, H. Allen, The Prairie School: Frank Lloyd Wright and his Midwest Contemporaries, University of Toronto Press, Toronto 1972; ISBN 0-8020-5251-7
- Brooks, H. Allen (editor), Writings on Wright: Selected Comment on Frank Lloyd Wright, MIT Press, Cambridge MA and London 1981; ISBN 0-262-02161-7
- Visser, Kristin, Frank Lloyd Wright & the Prairie School in Wisconsin: An Architectural Touring Guide, Trails Media Group; 2nd Rev edition (June, 1998). ISBN 1-879483-51-3.
