= Oak Circle Historic District =

Historic district in Illinois, United States

- U.S. National Register of Historic Places
- U.S. Historic district
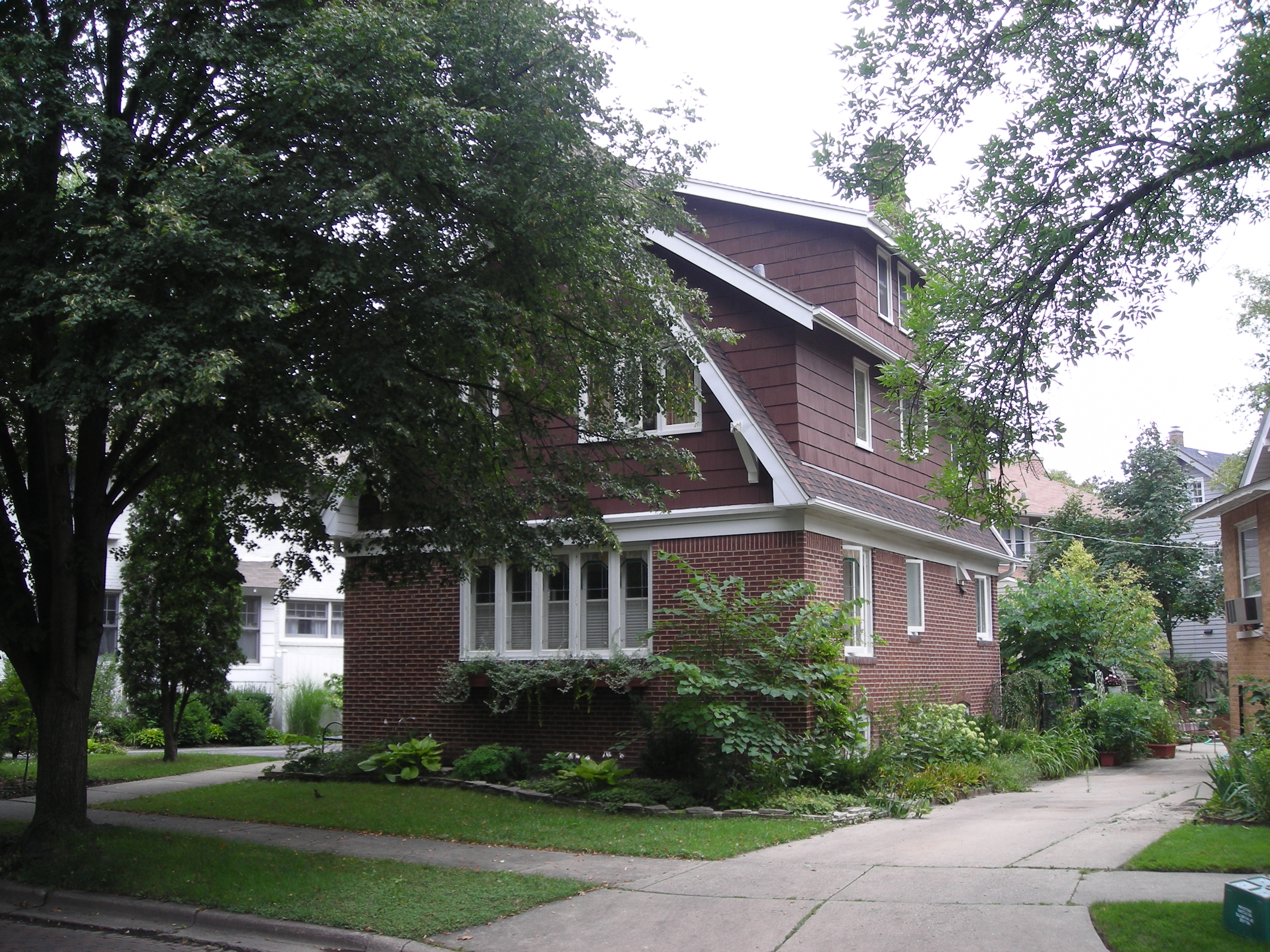
- Bungalow at 344 Oak Circle

- Location within Illinois Location within the United States
- Location: 318-351 Oak Circle, Wilmette, Illinois
- Coordinates: 42°4′20″N 87°42′39″W
- Area: 2.6 acres (1.1 ha)
- Architect: Dickinson, A.W.
- Architectural style: Prairie School, Bungalow/Craftsman
- NRHP reference No.: 01000668
- Added to NRHP: June 21, 2001

The Oak Circle Historic District is a historic district in Wilmette, Illinois, United States. The district covers 2.6 acres (0.011 km^{2}) and includes twenty-two contributing properties and four non-contributing properties, all located along Oak Circle. It primarily consists of fifteen single-family homes representative of the Prairie School and Craftsman styles of architecture. The Oak Circle Historic District was added to the National Register of Historic Places on June 21, 2001; it was the first historic district to be designated in Wilmette.

== Geography ==
The Oak Circle Historic District is centered on Oak Circle, a curved brick street in southern Wilmette; Oak Circle is one of three curved Wilmette streets paved prior to World War I. Oak Circle is approximately 400 feet (120 m) long and is bordered by Wilmette Avenue to the north and an alley to the south. Twenty-six properties are located along Oak Circle; fifteen of these are homes, and the other eleven are detached garages alongside the homes. The homes along Oak Circle are set back about 35 feet (11 m) on the west side of the street and 25 feet (7.6 m) on the east side. Lot sizes of the properties in the district are around 5000 to 6,000 square feet (560 m^{2}); many of the lots are irregular due to the curvature of Oak Circle. Many of the lots include trees, which are considered to contribute to the character of the district.

== History ==
The first fourteen homes on Oak Circle were platted in 1907 as part of Joseph Woodruff's Addition to Wilmette. Oak Circle was paved in 1911, and homes on the west side of the street were likely built between 1917 and 1920; however, the permits indicating the precise dates of their construction were lost in the 1920 Palm Sunday tornado outbreak. The homes on the east side of Oak Circle were constructed after 1920. A. W. Dickinson added a lot to Oak Circle in 1920 and constructed the houses on the east side; their similarity to the western houses suggests Dickinson built those houses as well.

== Architecture ==
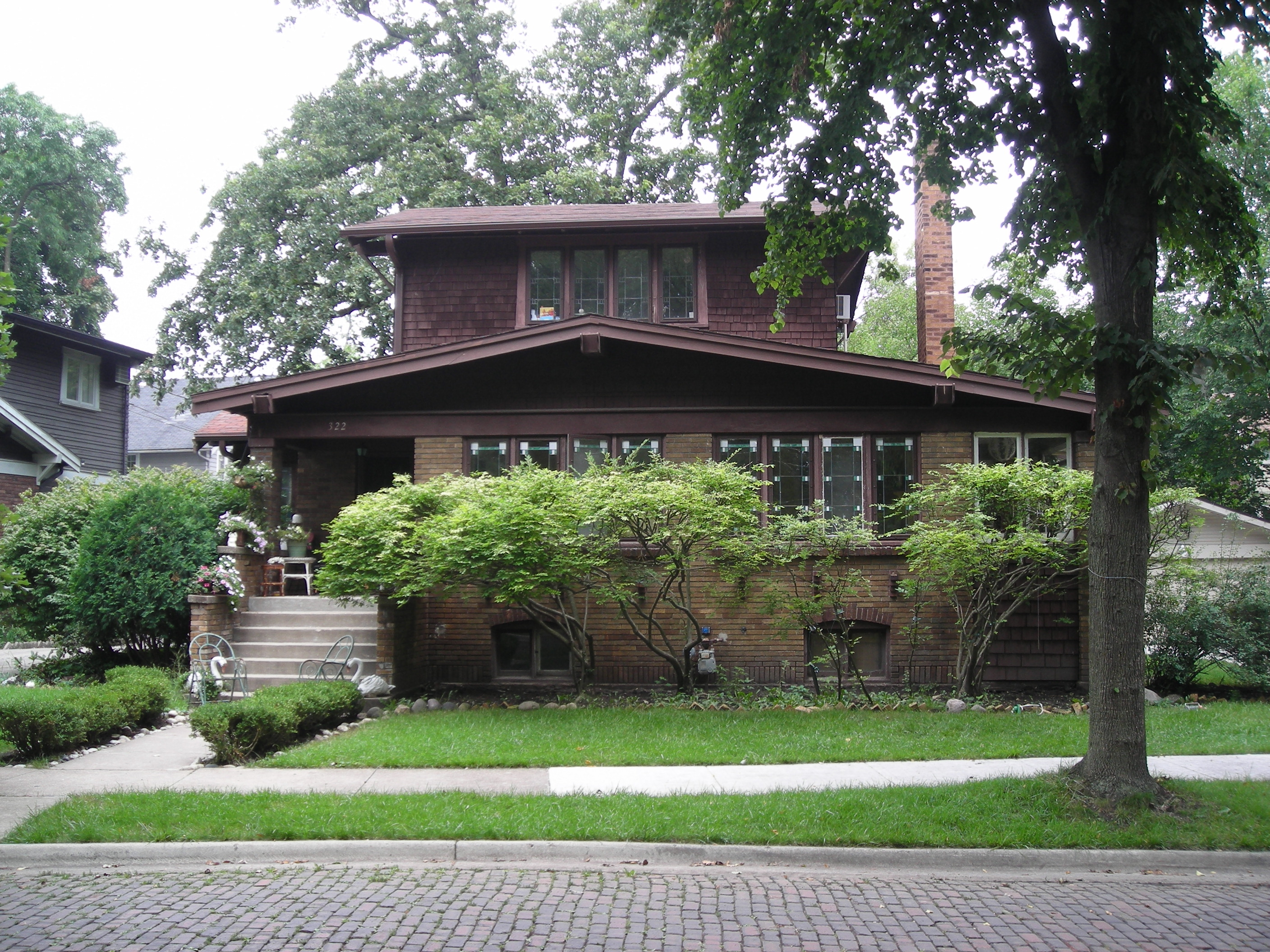
An Airplane Bungalow at 322 Oak Circle

Twelve of the fifteen homes in the Oak Circle Historic District are bungalows, and they exhibit various elements of the Craftsman and Prairie School movements. Craftsman elements in the houses generally included low, gabled roofs, overhanging eaves, decorative beams, and materials such as wood, stone and brick. The Prairie School was reflected in the homes' bands of windows with geometric glazed patterns; the houses originally included an average of 40 of these windows, many of which had colored glass. Colonial Revival and Italian Renaissance influences can also be seen in the bungalow at 340 Oak Circle, the last of the bungalows to be built. Three of the bungalows are Airplane Bungalows, a style in which the upper story of the home sits above the lower story like a cockpit above the wings of an airplane. The twelve bungalows are a mix of one-story and one-and-a-half-story homes; no two homes on Oak Circle are exactly alike. The remaining three homes are two-story homes which also demonstrate the Craftsman and Prairie School influences seen in the other homes. Several of the eleven garages in the district are also contributing properties; the garages at 328, 332, and 344 Oak Circle have architectural details similar to their respective houses.
