= Kenilworth Club =

- Kenilworth Assembly Hall
- U.S. National Register of Historic Places
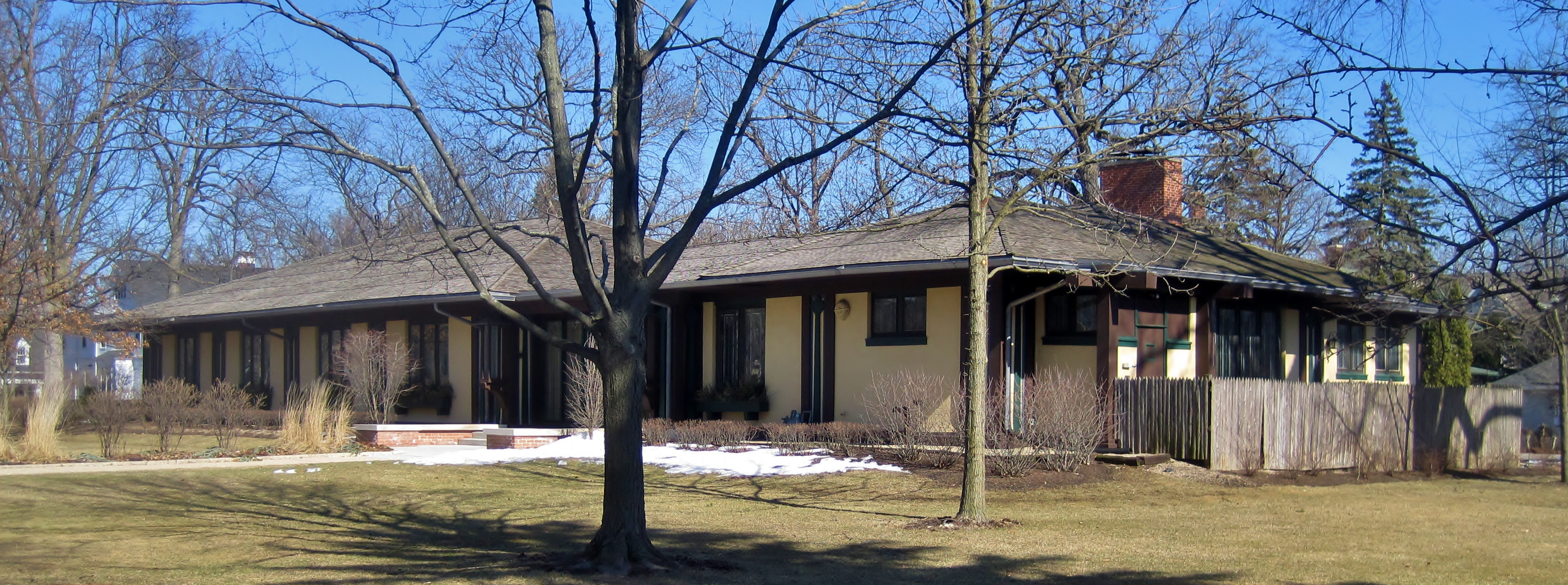

- Location within Illinois Location within the United States
- Location: 410 Kenilworth Ave., Kenilworth, Illinois
- Coordinates: 42°5′11″N 87°42′57″W
- Area: less than one acre
- Built: 1907
- Architect: Maher, George W.
- Architectural style: Prairie School
- NRHP reference No.: 79000832
- Added to NRHP: March 21, 1979

The Kenilworth Assembly Hall is a historic clubhouse located at 410 Kenilworth Avenue in Kenilworth, Illinois. The clubhouse was built in 1907 as a social club for the wealthy Chicago suburb. Resident and noted Prairie School architect George W. Maher designed the building. His design represents a transitional stage in his work; it was his last building to feature a significant horizontal emphasis, and it includes several early hints at style elements he later became known for. The windows are arranged in groups of three, which was typical of Maher's later works, and a stem-and-square motif used in several external elements evokes the signature thistle patterns he introduced the next year. The horizontal elements, which include the broad eaves and wall paneling, exhibit Maher's difficulties with the horizontal form of the Prairie School and were called "unsatisfactory" by architectural historian Carl W. Condit.

The clubhouse was added to the National Register of Historic Places on March 21, 1979.

The Kenilworth Club donated the Kenilworth Assembly Hall to the Kenilworth Park District on August 1, 2016.
