= Coffeen =

Coffeen may refer to:

- Coffeen, Illinois, United States
- Henry A. Coffeen (1841–1912), American politician
- Jim Coffeen (1887–1955), American football player
- William and Helen Coffeen House, Illinois, United States
