= Sheridan Road =

Road in Illinois and Wisconsin

Coordinates: 42°3′17.2″N 87°40′37.9″W

- Philip H. Sheridan Memorial Road; Historic Illinois Route 42
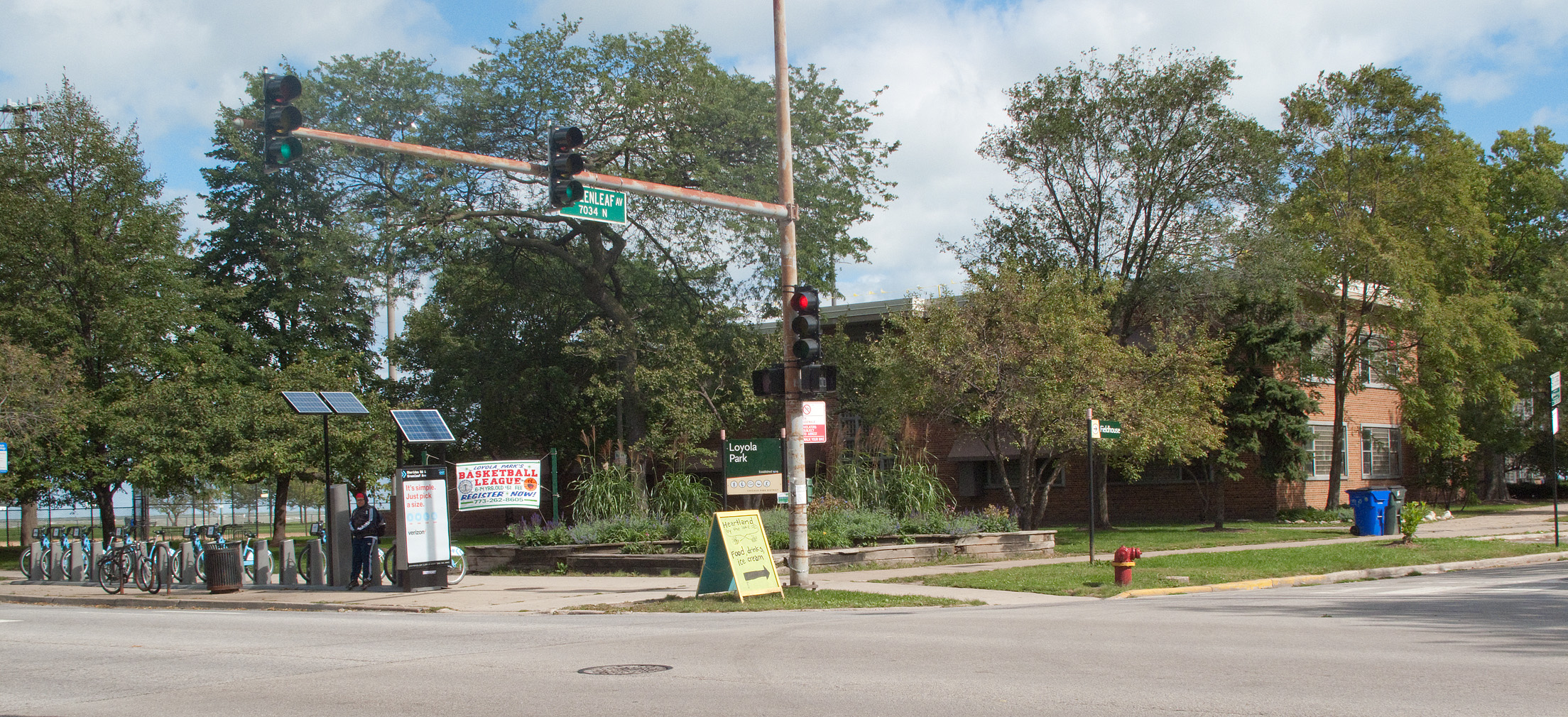
- Sheridan Road at Greenleaf Avenue, located at Loyola Park
- Sheridan Road in red Signed alternative streets in blue Closed portion in black
- Part of: IL 137; WIS 32; LMCT
- Length: 62.1 mi (99.9 km)
- South end: Diversey Parkway in Chicago, IL (2800 North)
- North end: 25th and Racine Streets in Racine, WI

Sheridan Road is a major north–south street that leads from Diversey Parkway in Chicago, Illinois, north to the Illinois–Wisconsin state line and beyond to Racine. Throughout most of its run, it is the easternmost north–south through street, closest to Lake Michigan. From Chicago, it passes through Chicago's wealthy lakeside North Shore suburbs, and then Waukegan and Zion, until it reaches the state line in Winthrop Harbor. In Wisconsin, the road leads north through Pleasant Prairie and Kenosha, until it ends on the south side of Racine, in Mount Pleasant.

From North Chicago to the state line, Sheridan Road is signed as part of Illinois Route 137 (IL 137) in Illinois, and Wisconsin Highway 32 (WIS 32) through Kenosha and Racine in Wisconsin. Sheridan Road is known for its historic sites, lakefront parks, and gracious mansion homes in Evanston through Lake Bluff.

== History ==
A suburban extension of Chicago's Lake Shore Drive to Waukegan was first promoted by the North Shore Improvement Association in the late 1880s. In February 1888, Fort Sheridan at Highwood was named in honor of General Philip Sheridan, who had fought in the American Civil War, coordinated firefighting and relief efforts during the Great Chicago Fire, and intervened to put down the Chicago railroad strike of 1877. Sheridan died the following August, and in February 1889 the new road, which was to run directly past the fort, was also named for him. Much of the route was laid out by 1893, and in 1894 it was proposed that the new road should be extended to Milwaukee, Wisconsin. Progress on construction was slowed by local opposition in some of the communities that it was to pass through, and construction was not completed until 1918.

In 1915, most of Sheridan Road was designated part of the Yellowstone Trail, an early auto trail planned to cross the United States from coast to coast. The trail remained active to the end of the 1920s. A statue of Sheridan by artist Gutzon Borglum was placed alongside Sheridan Road and Belmont Avenue in Chicago's Lincoln Park in 1924.

Illinois Route 42
- Location: Winthrop Harbor–Chicago, Illinois
- Existed: 1918–1972

Sheridan Road in Illinois was signed as Illinois Route 42 (IL 42) in 1924; the original route ran along Sheridan Road from the Wisconsin border to Waukegan, then turned west along Washington Street, south along Green Bay Road (now part of IL 131), east along Rockland Road (now part of IL 176) before running south along Waukegan Road (now mostly part of IL 43).

In 1925, IL 42 was realigned to include all of Sheridan Road in Illinois; the route continued south to the Indiana border at Hammond, and the old route became IL 42A. In 1929, the southern terminus of IL 42 was changed to the south end of Sheridan Road as US 41 supplanted the southern part of the route. This made the route coextensive with the Illinois portion of Sheridan Road. In 1930, WIS 42 was designated along the road in Wisconsin; WIS 42 was truncated at Sheboygan in 1951, and WIS 32 was redesignated along Sheridan Road to the Illinois border as part of the interstate Red Arrow Highway in honor of Wisconsin and Michigan's 32nd Infantry Division.

The road became more of a local arterial road throughout the 1960s with the construction of I-94 to the east, and was reconstructed at that time. IL 42 was removed from the state highway system in 1972. In 1974, as part of the Amstutz Expressway's construction, the road was narrowed to two lanes and an overpass built in Waukegan.

The road was designated as part of the Lake Michigan Circle Tour in 1988. On September 5, 2025, a one-block section of Sheridan Road was given an honorary street name after comedian Bob Newhart, the Chicago native whose titular 1970s sitcom took place in the city. Bob Newhart Way is in front of the Thorndale Beach Condominiums, which served as the setting for the home of Newhart's character Bob Hartley and his wife Emily (Suzanne Pleshette).

Browse numbered routes
← IL 41	IL 42	→ IL 43

== Places of interest ==
There are several landmarks and places of interest along Sheridan Road. The street passes through central business districts in the Uptown area of Chicago, Highland Park, Illinois, Highwood, Illinois, Lake Forest, Illinois, Waukegan, Illinois, Zion, Illinois, and Kenosha, Wisconsin, and near those of several other communities. Notable landmarks in order from southernmost to northernmost:

- Commonwealth Plaza Condominiums
- Philip Henry Sheridan Statue
- The Breakers at Edgewater Beach Apartments
- Park Tower Condominium
- The Renaissance (Building at 5510 North Sheridan)
- Edgewater Condominium Plaza, 5445 North Sheridan occupies the precise spot of Edgewater Beach Hotel; 5455 North Sheridan, its twin building is set at right angle to the street)
- Edgewater Beach Apartments
- Colvin House
- Mundelein College Skyscraper Building
- Loyola University, Lakeshore Campus
- Emil Bach House
- Calvary Cemetery
- Northwestern University
- Levere Memorial Temple, headquarters of Sigma Alpha Epsilon fraternity
- Grosse Point Lighthouse
- Bahá'í House of Worship
- Plaza del Lago
- Henry Demarest Lloyd House
- North Shore Congregation Israel
- Ravinia Festival
- North Shore Sanitary District Tower
- Willits House
- Fort Sheridan
- Barat College
- Lake Forest College
- Great Lakes Naval Training Center
- AbbVie
- Genesee Theatre
- Illinois Beach State Park
- Chiwaukee Prairie
- Kenosha Sand Dunes
- Gilbert M. Simmons Memorial Library
- Bradford Community Church
- Dinosaur Discovery Museum
- Carthage College

== Chicago path ==
- It runs at 400 west from 2800 north (Diversey Parkway) to 3181 north (Belmont Avenue).
- It runs at 3900 north from 600 (Lake Shore Drive) west to 956 west (Sheffield Avenue).
- It runs at 1000 west from 3900 north (Byron Street) to 6356 north.
- It runs at 6400 north from 970 west to 1158 west (Broadway).
- It runs at 1200 west from 6400 north (Broadway/Devon Avenue) to 6756 north (Pratt Boulevard).
- It runs from 1200 west at 6800 north to 1400 west at 7800 north (northern city limit).

== Transit ==
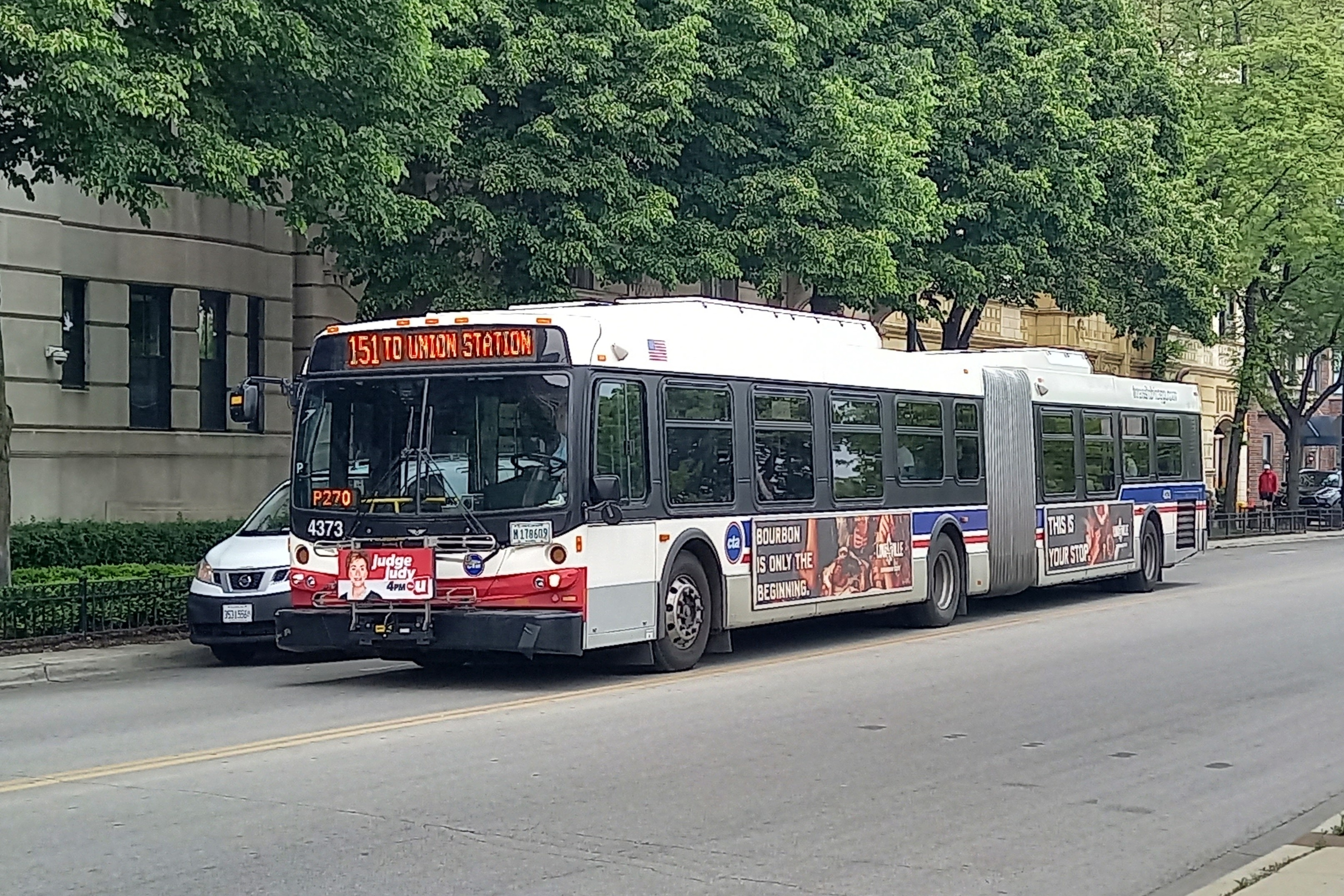
CTA route 151 bus along Inner Lake Shore Drive

In Chicago, the Chicago Transit Authority (CTA) operates the 151 Sheridan bus route primarily along Sheridan Road. The bus route runs from a bus turnaround north of Clark Street/Devon Avenue to Chicago Union Station.

The bus route began operation on March 25, 1917, as the first motor bus service in Chicago. At the time, the route was numbered 51 and was operated by the Chicago Motor Bus Company (later the Chicago Motor Coach Company). When the CTA purchased the bus company in 1952, the route was renumbered to 151.

== Major intersections ==
State	County	Location	mi	km	Destinations	Notes
Illinois	Cook	Chicago	0.0	0.0	Diversey Parkway	Southern terminus, roadway continues as Lakeview Avenue
Illinois	Cook	Chicago	0.5	0.80	Belmont Avenue	Northern terminus of southern section, roadway continues as Lake Shore Drive
Illinois	Cook	Chicago	Gap in route			
Illinois	Cook	Chicago	0.5	0.80	IL 19 (Irving Park Road)	Southern terminus of south-central section
Illinois	Cook	Chicago	2.0	3.2	US 41 (Foster Avenue) / LMCT south	South end of LMCT concurrency
Illinois	Cook	Chicago	2.6	4.2	To US 14 (Hollywood Avenue)	
Illinois	Cook	Evanston	7.0	11.3	Burnham Place	Northern terminus of south-central section
Illinois	Cook	Evanston	Gap in route			
Illinois	Cook	Evanston	7.0	11.3	Church Street	Southern terminus of central section
Illinois	Lake	Highland Park	22.5	36.2	St. Johns Avenue	Northern terminus of central section
Illinois	Lake	Highland Park	Gap in route			
Illinois	Lake	Highland Park	22.5	36.2	Bloom Street/Waukegan Avenue	Southern terminus of north-central section
Illinois	Lake	Lake Bluff	29.1	46.8	To IL 176 (Rockland Road/Scranton Avenue)	
Illinois	Lake	North Chicago	31.2	50.2	To IL 137 (Buckley Road)	Interchange
Illinois	Lake	North Chicago	32.0	51.5	IL 137 south (Bobby E. Thompson Expressway)	South end of IL 137 concurrency
Illinois	Lake	Waukegan	33.8	54.4	IL 137 north (Amstutz Expressway)	Northern terminus of north-central section, north end of IL 137 concurrency
Illinois	Lake	Waukegan	Gap in route			
Illinois	Lake	Waukegan	33.8	54.4	Belvidere Road	Southern terminus of northern section
Illinois	Lake	Waukegan	35.8	57.6	IL 137 south (Greenwood Avenue)	South end of IL 137 concurrency
Illinois	Lake	Beach Park	38.4	61.8	Beach Road - Waukegan National Airport	
Illinois	Lake	Beach Park	39.1	62.9	CR A9 west (Wadsworth Road)	Eastern terminus of CR A9
Illinois	Lake	Zion	40.9	65.8	IL 173 west (21st Street)	Eastern terminus of IL 173
Illinois	Lake	Winthrop Harbor	43.4	69.8	CR A1 west (Russell Road) IL 137 ends / WIS 32 begins	North end of IL 137 concurrency, south end of WIS 32 concurrency, eastern terminus of CR A1
			43.4	69.8	Illinois–Wisconsin state line	
Wisconsin	Kenosha	Pleasant Prairie	45.5	73.2	WIS 165 west (104th Street)	Eastern terminus of WIS 165
Wisconsin	Kenosha	Kenosha	49.4	79.5	WIS 50 west (63rd Street)	Eastern terminus of WIS 50
Wisconsin	Kenosha	Kenosha	50.1	80.6	WIS 158 west (52nd Street)	Eastern terminus of WIS 158
Wisconsin	Kenosha	Kenosha	51.5	82.9	WIS 32 north / LMCT north	North end of WIS 32 concurrency
Wisconsin	Kenosha	Kenosha	52.8	85.0	WIS 32 south / LMCT south	South end of WIS 32 concurrency
Wisconsin	Kenosha–Racine county line	Kenosha	55.8	89.8	WIS 195 west (1st Street)	Eastern terminus of WIS 195
Wisconsin	Racine	Racine	58.0	93.3	WIS 11 west (Durand Avenue)	Eastern terminus of WIS 11
Wisconsin	Racine	Racine	59.6	95.9	WIS 20 west / WIS 32 north / LMCT north (Washington Avenue)	Northern terminus, eastern terminus of WIS 20
1.000 mi = 1.609 km; 1.000 km = 0.621 mi: Concurrency terminus

== See also ==
- Marshall/Goldblatt mansion, demolished mansion formerly located along Sherdian Road in Wilmette, Illinois
