= George B. Dryden House =

Historic house in Illinois, United States

- U.S. National Register of Historic Places
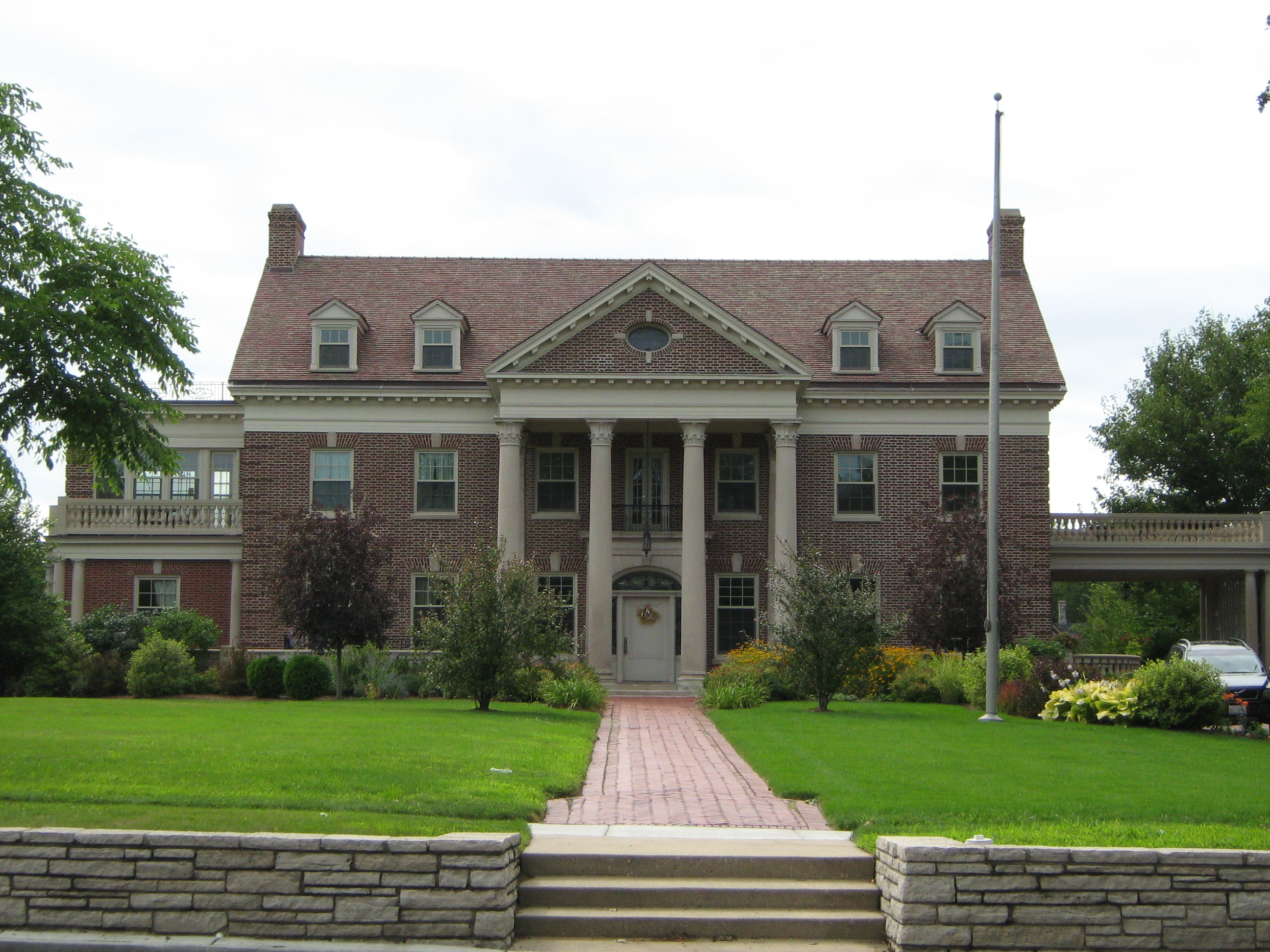

- Location within Illinois Location within the United States
- Location: 1314 Ridge Ave., Evanston, Illinois
- Coordinates: 42°2′30″N 87°41′21″W
- Area: 2 acres (0.81 ha)
- Built: 1916
- Architect: Maher, George W.
- Architectural style: Georgian Revival
- NRHP reference No.: 78001135
- Added to NRHP: December 18, 1978

The George B. Dryden House is a historic house located at 1314 Ridge Avenue in Evanston, Illinois. The house was built in 1916 for George B. and Ellen A. Dryden. George was a successful Chicago businessman, while Ellen was the heiress of George Eastman; together, the couple was worth over $9 million. Architect George W. Maher designed the Georgian Revival house. While Maher was better known as a Prairie School architect, the Drydens requested a Georgian design inspired by Ellen's memories of Eastman's home. The three-story house features an entrance portico supported by four Corinthian columns and topped by a pediment. The house is faced with brick and features quoins at the corners and keystones above the windows. A wooden frieze and cornice run below the base of the roof, which begins below the third floor and features several projecting dormers.

The house was added to the National Register of Historic Places on December 18, 1978.
