= Edmund Blinn House =

Historic house in California, United States

- U.S. National Register of Historic Places
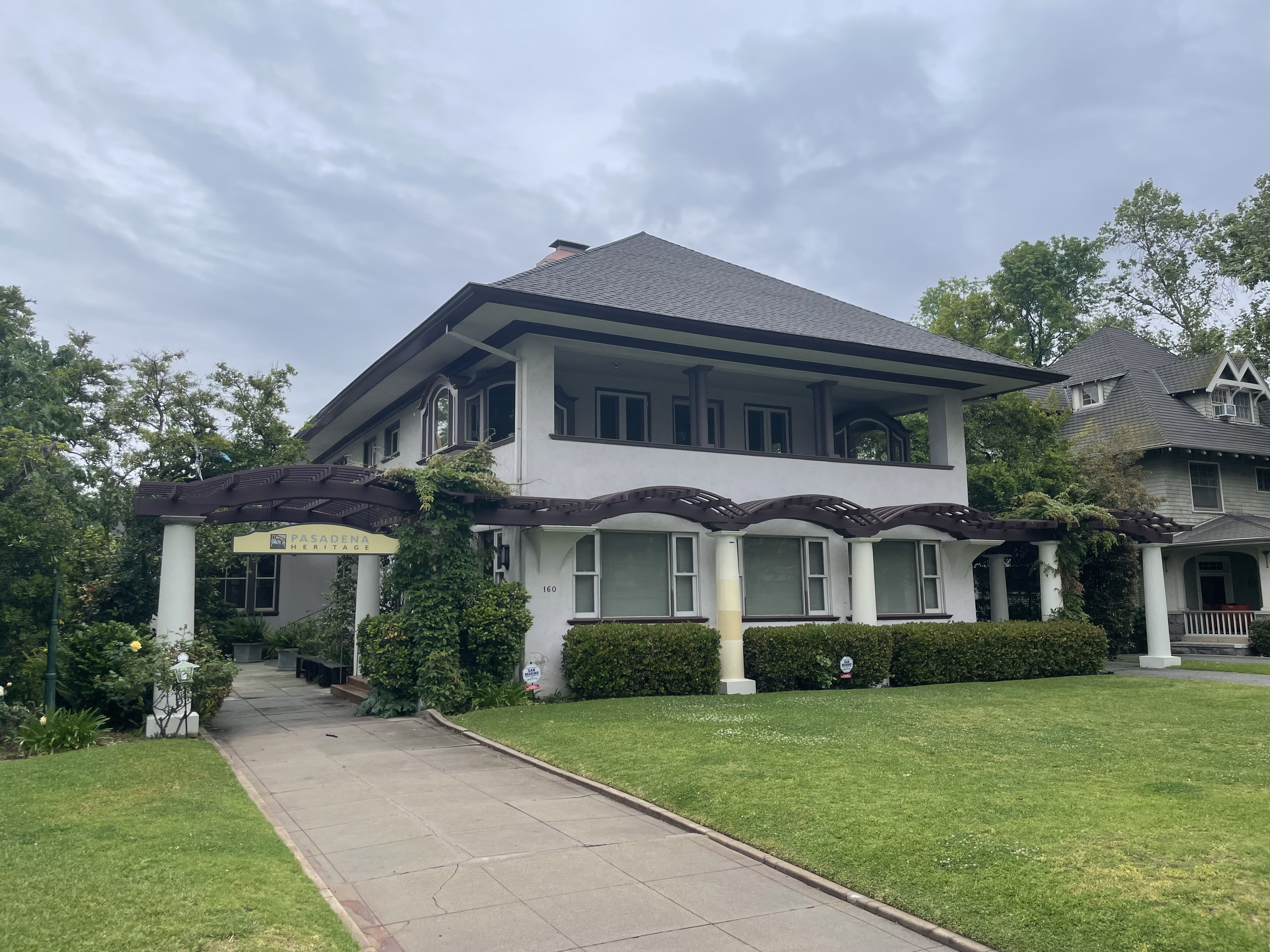

- Location within the Los Angeles metropolitan area Location within California Location within the United States
- Location: 160 N. Oakland Ave., Pasadena, California
- Coordinates: 34°8′55″N 118°8′23″W
- Built: 1905
- Architect: George Washington Maher
- Architectural style: Prairie School
- NRHP reference No.: 01000329
- Added to NRHP: April 5, 2001

The Edmund Blinn House is located in Pasadena, Los Angeles County, California. It was listed on the National Register of Historic Places in 2001.

== History ==
The Blinn House was designed in the Prairie School style by architect George Washington Maher, a follower of Louis H. Sullivan and a contemporary of Frank Lloyd Wright. The house was built in 1905, with an American Craftsman style attention to aesthetic integration.

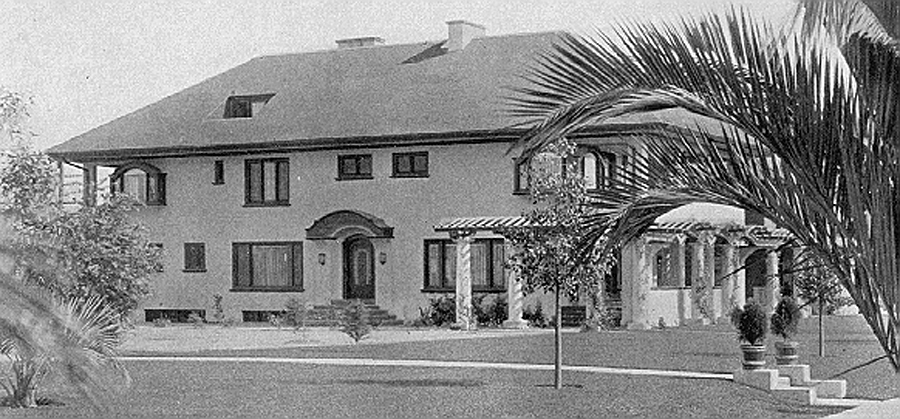
The Edmund Blinn House, Inland Architect magazine photo, July 1907, Pasadena.

== Women's City Club ==
After it dissolved the previous year and after nearly 76 years in the house, the Women's City Club of Pasadena in 2021 gifted The Edmund Blinn House to Pasadena Heritage, which maintains its headquarters in the building.

== See also ==
- National Register of Historic Places listings in Pasadena, California
- "George Washington Maher - architect of the Edmund Blinn House"
