= Rath House =

Prairie-style house in Chicago, Illinois

Coordinates: 41.9279°N 87.6953°W

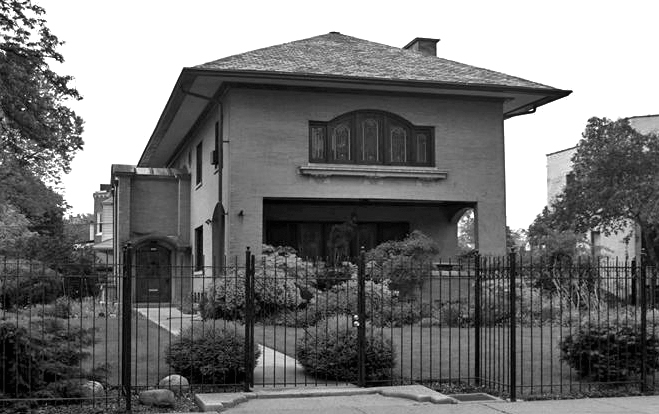
The John Rath House

The Rath House is a Prairie-style house at 2703 West Logan Boulevard in the Logan Square neighborhood of Chicago, Illinois. It was built in 1907 to a design by George W. Maher for John Rath, who owned one of the largest barrel-making companies in the United States. The house was designated a Chicago Landmark on December 1, 1993.

== Architecture and setting ==
The building's traditional boxlike form is updated by a broad hipped roof and stark window and door openings. It also has a low roofline and deep eaves, together with entryway and doorway arches and art-glass windows. The house is within the Logan Square Boulevards Historic District, a Chicago Landmark district designated in 2005. The September 1908 issue of The Inland Architect and News Record featured exterior and interior views of the house.
