= Colvin House =

House in Chicago, Illinois, US

Coordinates: 41.9904°N 87.6558°W

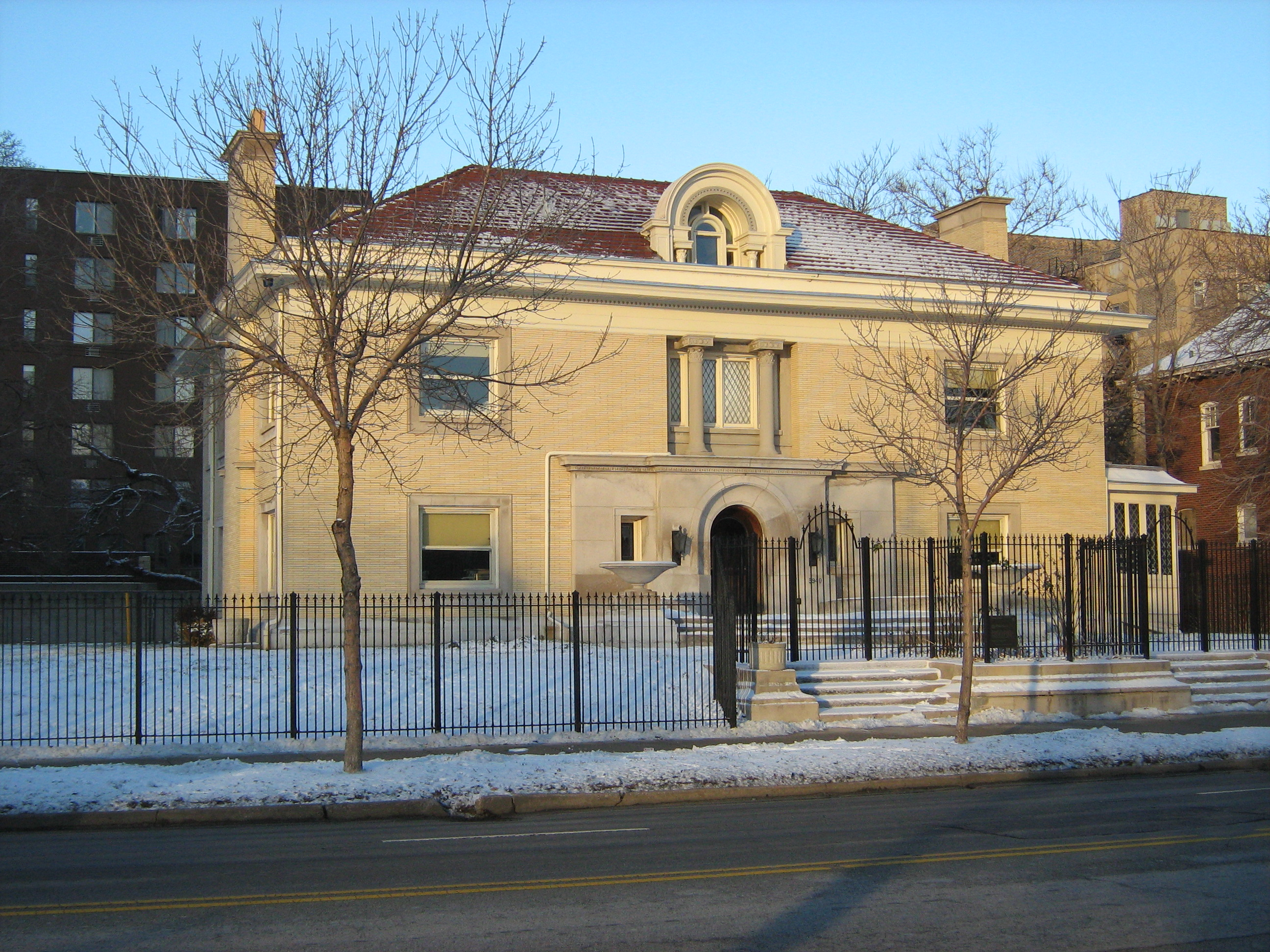
Colvin House

The Colvin House is a house at 5940 North Sheridan Road in Chicago, Illinois, United States. The house was built in 1909 in the Prairie Style by George W. Maher. It was designated a Chicago Landmark on October 5, 1994. This residence was built for Edwin M. Colvin, his wife Clara and their four children. Colvin moved to Chicago in 1885 and worked in the printing industry, ultimately becoming an executive with F.W. Hall Printing Company.

Published in Architectural Record in February 1916, the design reflects Maher's earlier work for such houses as Pleasant Home for John Farson and the A.B. Leach house. The building's roof is topped with Ludowici clay tile.
