= Winona Savings Bank Building =

- U.S. National Register of Historic Places
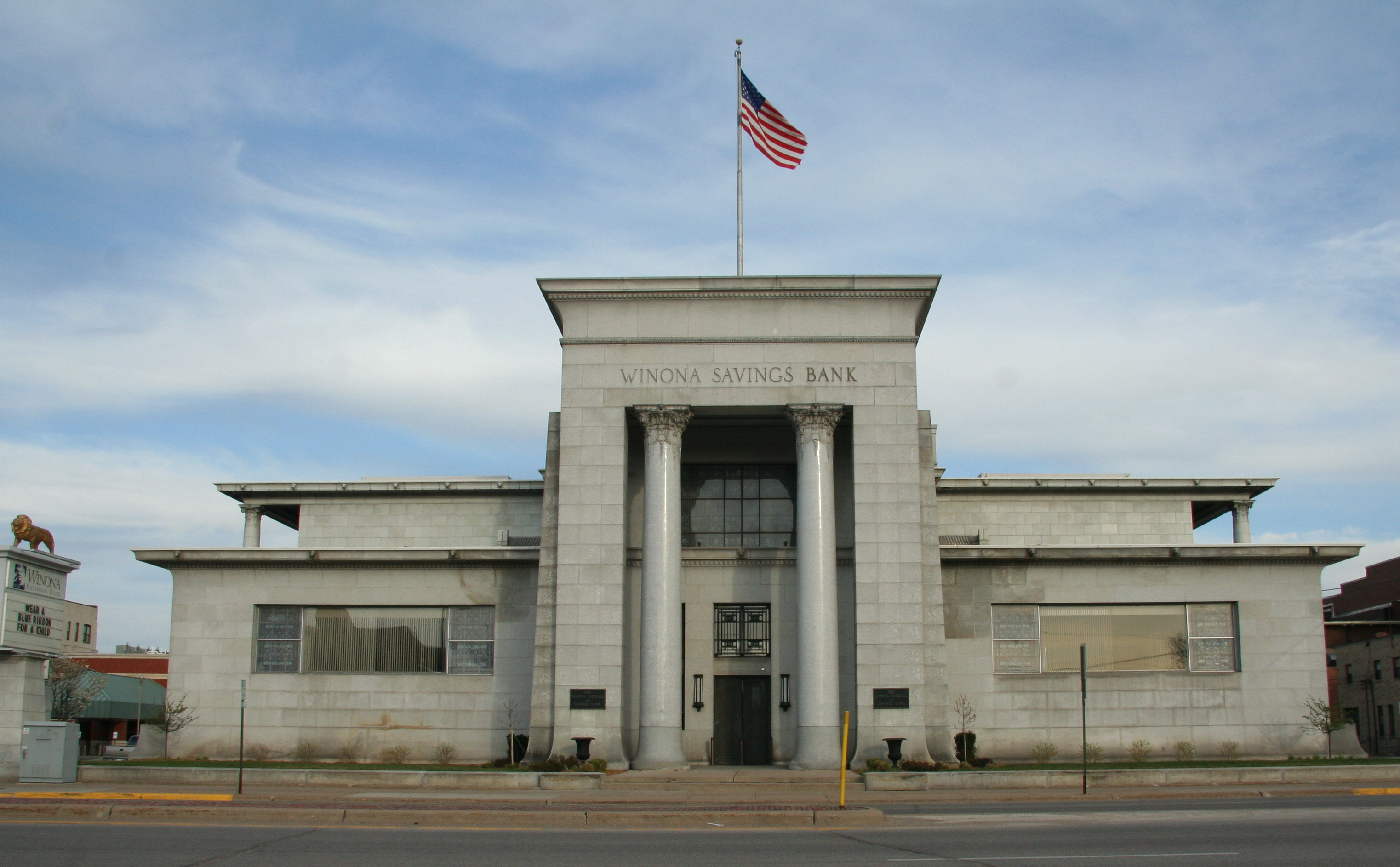
- The Winona Savings Bank Building from the northwest

- Location within Minnesota Location within the United States
- Location: 204 Main Street, Winona, Minnesota
- Coordinates: 44°3′5″N 91°38′17″W
- Area: Less than one acre
- Built: 1914–1916
- Built by: Haglin-Stahr Company
- Architect: George W. Maher
- Architectural style: Egyptian Revival
- NRHP reference No.: 77000776
- Designated: September 15, 1977

The Winona Savings Bank Building, now the Winona National Bank Historic Downtown Building, is an Egyptian Revival bank building in Winona, Minnesota, United States. It was designed by Chicago-based architect George W. Maher and constructed from 1914 to 1916. The building was listed on the National Register of Historic Places in 1977 for having state-level significance in the themes of architecture and commerce. It was nominated for being the largest and best preserved of Minnesota's few early-20th-century Egyptian Revival buildings, and one of Maher's master works in the state.

The bank contains on the third floor of it a taxidermy gallery of African wildlife and guns by bank president EL King.

== See also ==
- National Register of Historic Places listings in Winona County, Minnesota
