= Hiram C. Stewart House =

Historic house in Wisconsin, United States

- U.S. National Register of Historic Places
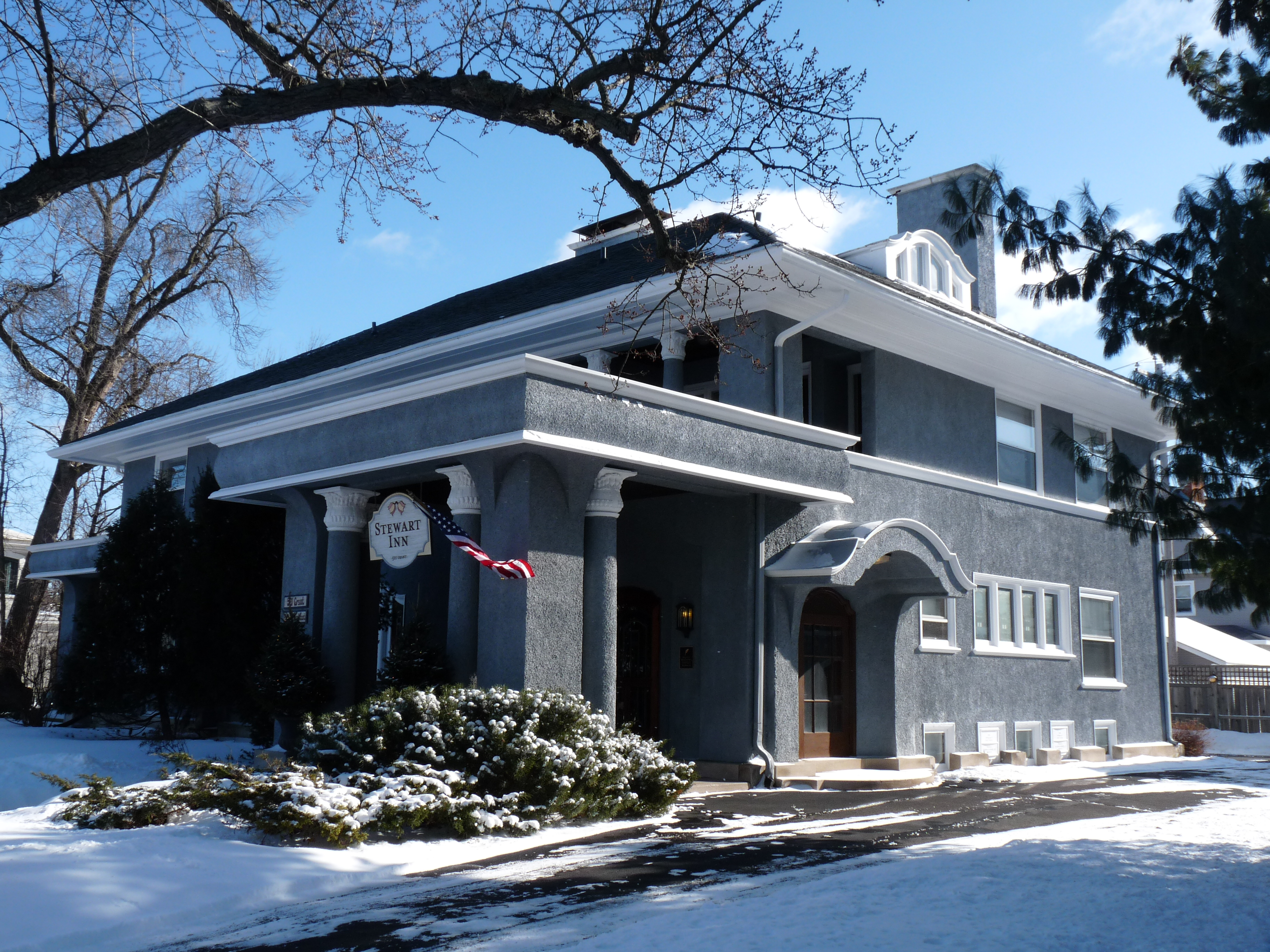

- Location within Wisconsin Location within the United States
- Location: 521 Grant Street, Wausau, Wisconsin
- Coordinates: 44°57′42″N 89°37′26″W
- Built: 1906
- Architect: George W. Maher
- Architectural style: Prairie School
- NRHP reference No.: 74000097
- Added to NRHP: August 30, 1974

The Hiram C. Stewart House is a historic Prairie School house designed by George W. Maher located at 521 Grant Street in Wausau, Wisconsin. It was added to the National Register of Historic Places on August 30, 1974.

== Description and history ==
Stewart was a principal of Wausau's Barker and Stewart Lumber Company. In 1906, he had this house built from a design by Maher. It is generally Prairie Style, with horizontal lines and broad eaves. The exterior is stucco, and the interior is carefully designed too. Themes of a tulip and a tripartite arch repeat both inside and out, exemplifying Maher's "motif rhythm theory" of design.

The house currently serves as a bed and breakfast called the Stewart Inn.
