= Philip Brooks Maher =

American architect

Philip Brooks Maher FAIA (1894-1981) was an American architect. Born in Kenilworth, Illinois in 1894, he was the son and later the partner of George Washington Maher, who was an important figure in the Prairie School movement. In 1914, Philip Maher went to work in his father's architecture practice. He then studied architecture at the University of Michigan, was in the army and later traveled in Europe before rejoining his father's practice as a partner in 1921.

In 1924, the firm, renamed George W. Maher & Son, submitted the “Gateway Improvement Plan” for Gary, Indiana, where they had been designing other projects. After George Maher's death in 1926, his son continued in practice by himself. In 1927 he revised the plan, replacing Prairie School elements with Neoclassical Designs. In 1928 Philip Maher designed the city hall building for Gary.

Later in his career, Philip Maher's work was influenced by the Art Deco movement. In 1940, he was made a Fellow of the American Institute of Architects. He died in 1981.
