= Pleasant Home =

Historic house in Oak Park, Illinois

- John Farson House
- U.S. National Register of Historic Places
- U.S. National Historic Landmark
- U.S. Historic district – Contributing property
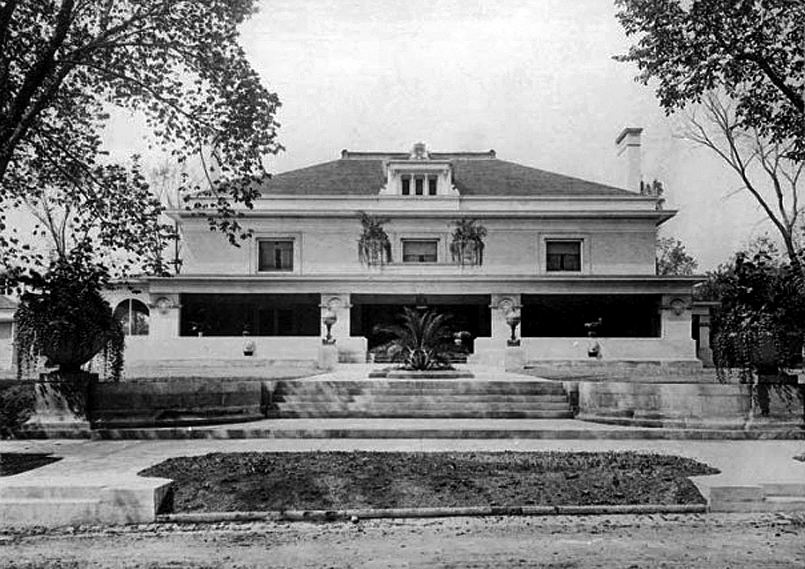
- historic view of front elevation of "Pleasant Home", which was built for John Farson.

- Location within Chicago metropolitan area Location within Illinois Location within the United States
- Interactive map showing the location of John Farson House
- Location: 217 Home Avenue, Oak Park, Cook County, Illinois
- Coordinates: 41°53′7″N 87°48′2″W
- Area: 4.7 acres (1.9 ha)
- Built: 1897
- Architect: George W. Maher
- Architectural style: Prairie style
- Part of: Ridgeland–Oak Park Historic District (ID83003564)
- NRHP reference No.: 72000454

Significant dates
- Added to NRHP: June 19, 1972
- Designated NHL: June 19, 1996

Pleasant Home, also known as the John Farson House, is a historic home located in the Chicago suburb of Oak Park, Illinois, United States. The large, Prairie style mansion was designed by architect George Washington Maher and completed in 1897. The house was added to the U.S. National Register of Historic Places on June 19, 1972, and was declared a National Historic Landmark by the United States Department of the Interior on June 19, 1996.

== History ==
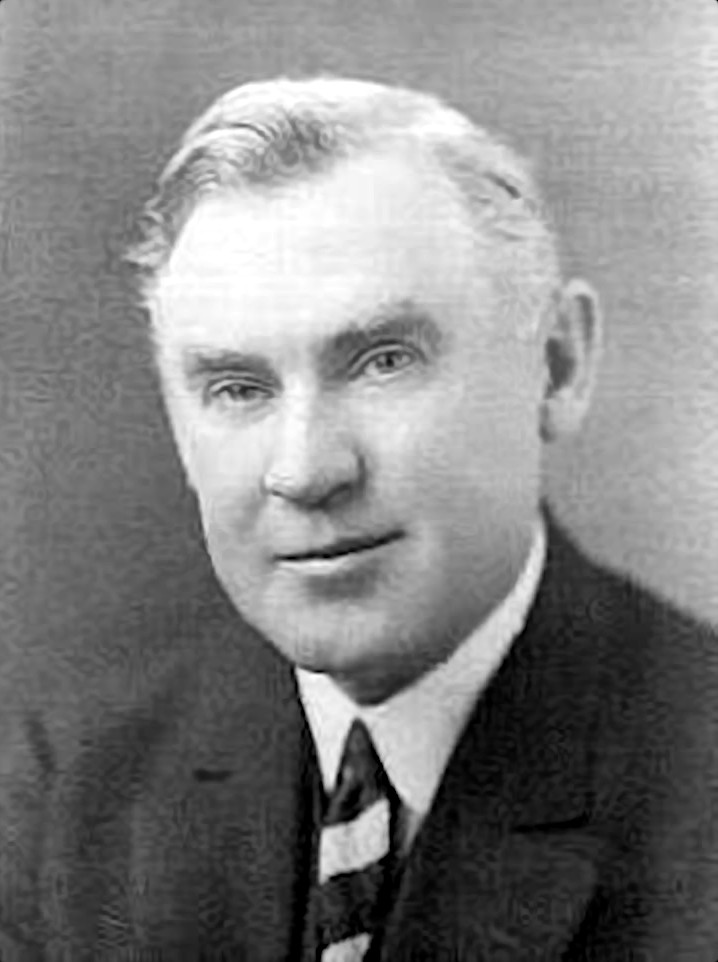
George Washington Maher (1864–1926)

Pleasant Home, historically known as the John Farson House, derives its common name from its location, at the intersection of Pleasant Street and Home Avenue in Oak Park. It was built and designed by prominent Prairie School architect George W. Maher in 1897. The house was constructed for John Farson, who lived in the house from 1897 until 1910. In 1910 the home's most recent private owner, Herbert S. Mills, bought the house and lived there until his death in 1929. After his wife's death in 1930 his children retained ownership of the home until they sold it to the Park District of Oak Park in 1939.

Herbert S. Mills owned The Mills Novelty Company, the maker of the Mills Violano-Virtuoso, an electric self-playing violin and piano mechanism. In 2009 a fully restored Mills Violano was installed at Pleasant Home by the Mills Novelty Company and Haughawout Music Company and is currently on display.

The Pleasant Home was situated on a larger lot, which was converted to a park now called Mills Park. Situated on the lot were also a greenhouse and a coach house where horse carriages and horses were originally kept, and later automobiles. The coach house and greenhouse have since been demolished due to deterioration from insufficient upkeep.

Restoration began on the house in 1966 with a US$26,000 rewiring project. In 1970, at a cost of more than $40,000, a number of tasks were completed in the restoration process. On the home's exterior, the fascia and soffit were rebuilt as needed and the roof was repaired as well. Also on the exterior, the wood surfaces were repainted. The repairs were conducted in a manner consistent with the original design and construction of the building.

== Significance ==
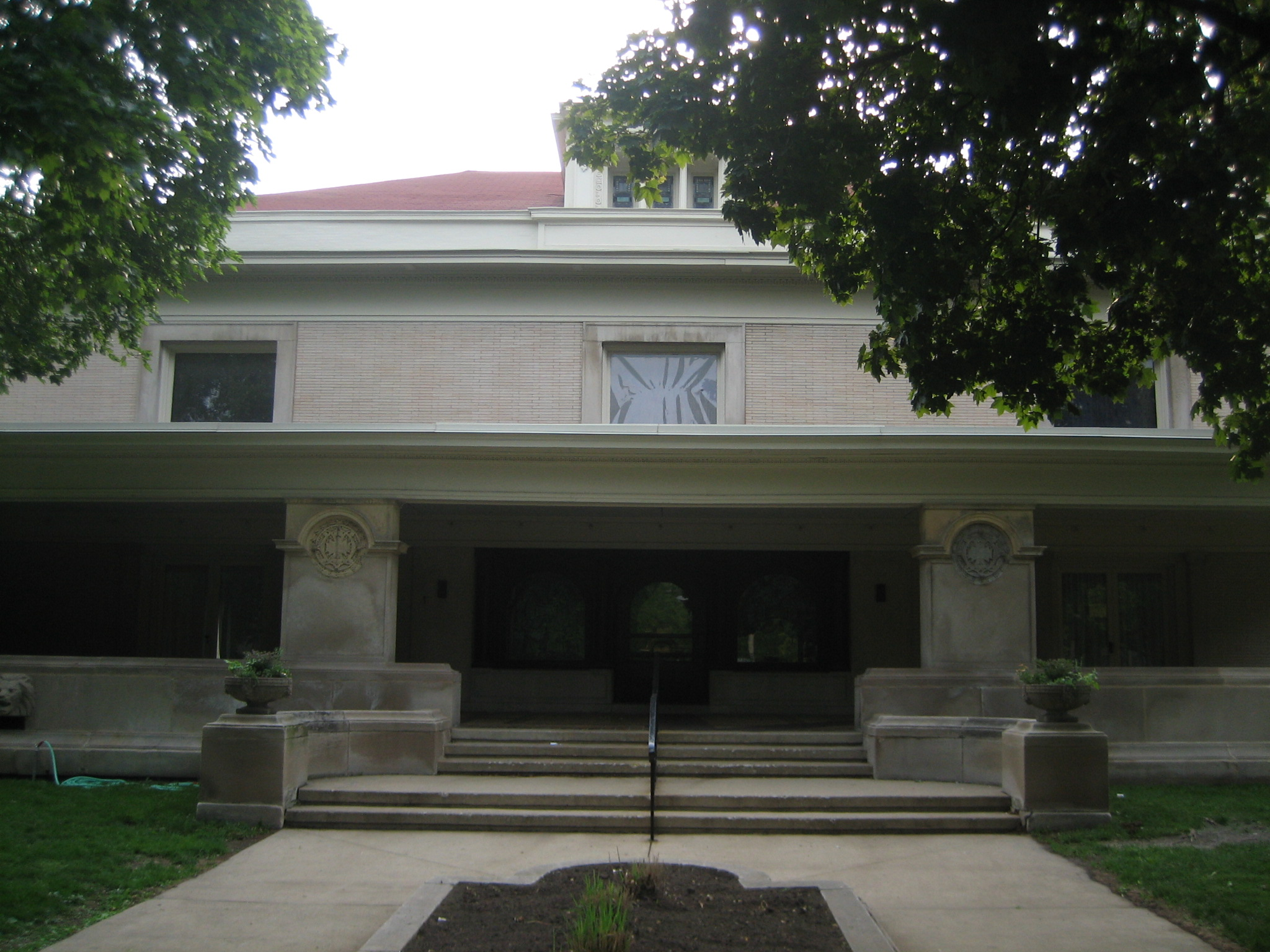
Front view of the John Farson House

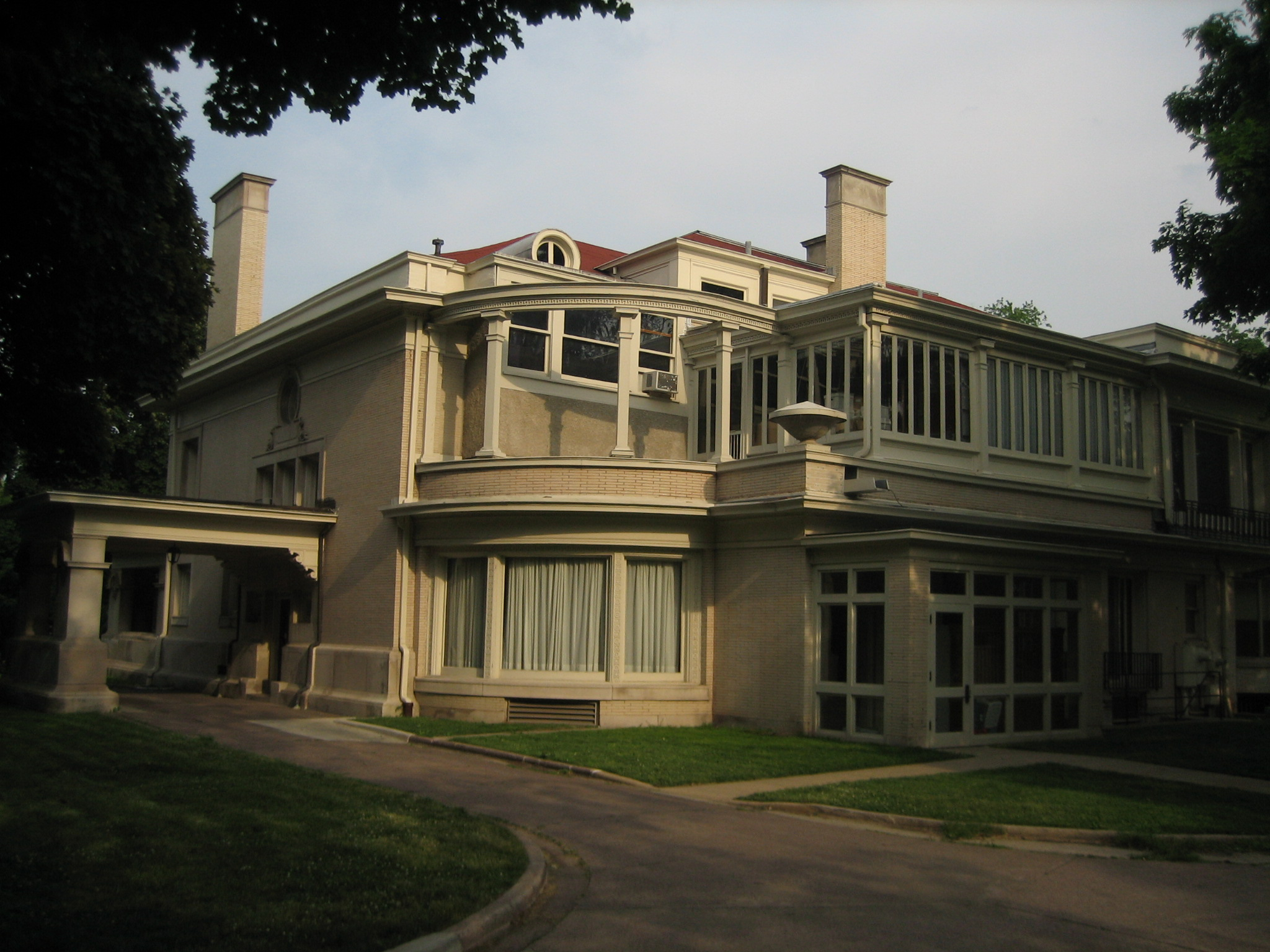
Rear view of the John Farson House

Pleasant Home is an important example of early Prairie style. The house is listed on the U.S. National Register of Historic Places; it was added on June 19, 1972. In addition to the structure's individual listing on the National Register it was listed as a contributing property to the Ridgeland-Oak Park Historic District when the district was added to the National Register in 1983. On June 19, 1996, Pleasant Home was declared a U.S. National Historic Landmark. Two days prior to the National Historic Landmark designation the village of Oak Park's village board declared the John Farson house an Oak Park Landmark. The Farson House is among the earliest of the Prairie style buildings. The house is considered the finest surviving example of Maher's work.

The Historical Society of Oak Park and River Forest was for many years located on the second floor of the Pleasant Home, but the society moved to the Landmark Firehouse at Lake and Lombard Streets in Oak Park in 2017.

== See also ==
- List of National Historic Landmarks in Illinois
- National Register of Historic Places listings in Cook County, Illinois
