= William and Helen Coffeen House =

Historic house in Illinois, United States

- U.S. National Register of Historic Places
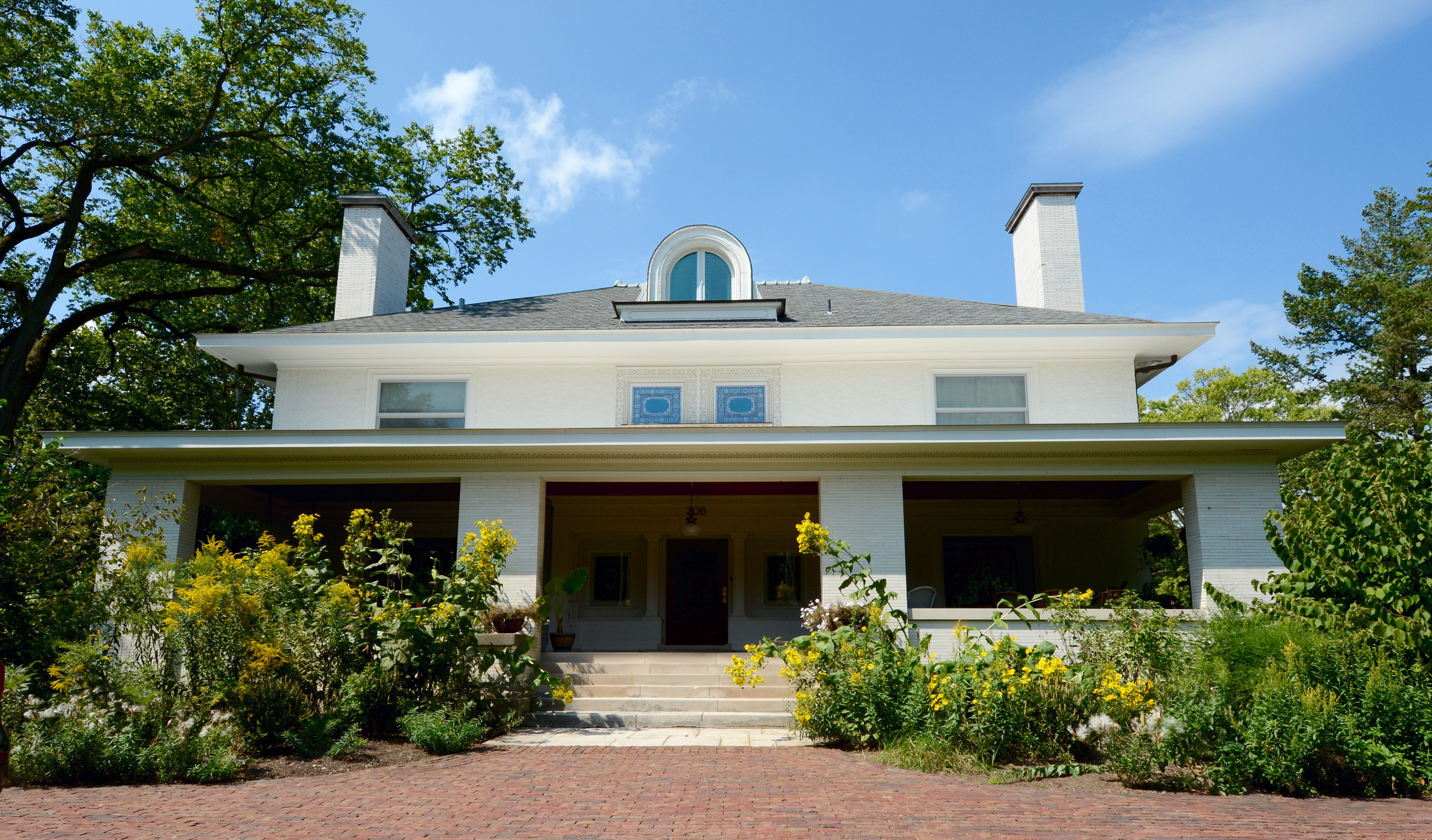

- Location within Illinois Location within the United States
- Location: 306 S. Garfield St., Hinsdale, Illinois
- Coordinates: 41°47′58″N 87°55′39″W
- Built: 1899-1900
- Architect: George W. Maher
- Architectural style: Prairie School
- NRHP reference No.: 14001066
- Added to NRHP: December 22, 2014

The William and Helen Coffeen House is a historic house located at 306 S. Garfield Street in Hinsdale, Illinois. Built in 1899–1900, the house is an early example of architect George W. Maher's Prairie School work. The house has a stucco exterior, a building material that ultimately became a distinctive element of Maher's work. The decorative wooden frame around the house's entrance and the extensive use of stained glass windows highlight how Maher developed a distinctive personal style of ornamentation in his designs. The house's original owners were real estate agent William Coffeen and his wife Helen, both of whom were active members of Hinsdale's civic and social life.

The house was added to the National Register of Historic Places on December 22, 2014.
