= George W. Maher =

American architect

George Washington Maher
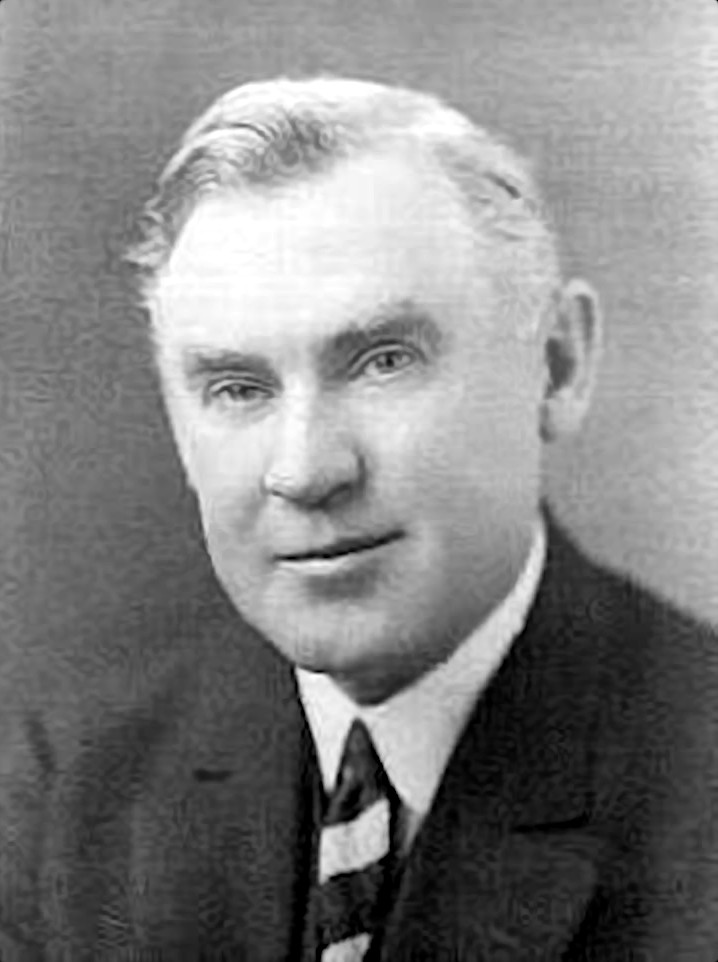
- Born: December 25, 1864; Charleston, West Virginia, U.S.
- Died: September 12, 1926 (aged 61); Douglas, Michigan
- Occupation: Architect

Signature
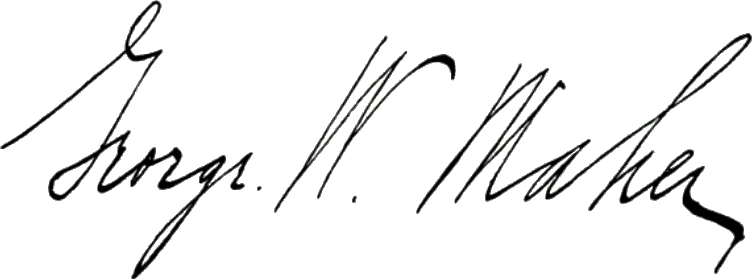

George Washington Maher (December 25, 1864 – September 12, 1926) was an American architect during the 1890s and the first quarter of the 20th century. He is considered part of the Prairie School-style and was known for blending traditional architecture with the Arts & Crafts-style.

According to architectural historian H. Allen Brooks, "His influence on the Midwest was profound and prolonged and, in its time, was certainly as great as was [Frank Lloyd] Wright's. Compared with the conventional architecture of the day, his work showed considerable freedom and originality, and his interiors were notable for their open and flowing...space".

Maher was elected a Fellow of the American Institute of Architects in 1916.

== Biography ==
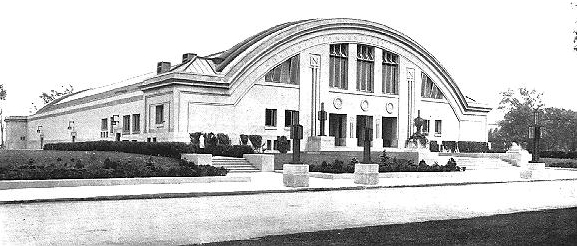
Patten Gymnasium at Northwestern University, 1908 (demolished)

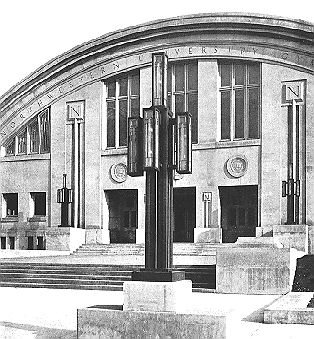
Patten Gymnasium entrance (demolished)

George Maher was born in Charleston, West Virginia, but as a small boy moved with his parents, Pennsylvania-born Sarah Landis and Virginia-born chemist Theophile Maher (whose father had immigrated from France) to Mill Creek, West Virginia and then to New Albany, Indiana, where he attended public schools. While in his teens the family moved to Chicago, although the exact date is not known.

The 1880 federal census records the Maher family as still living in New Albany. In 1883 a city directory shows George Maher living in the Chicago area and working for the Chicago architectural firm of Augustus Bauer and Henry Hill. In 1887 he joined the office of architect Joseph L. Silsbee, in Chicago's Lakeside Building, as a draftsman where he worked with Frank Lloyd Wright and George Grant Elmslie. In late 1888 Maher started his own practice and then in late 1889 formed a partnership with Cecil S. Corwin which lasted for only a brief time before he resumed his own practice. Maher married Elizabeth Brooks in 1893 and moved to Kenilworth, Illinois.

=== Career ===
He designed his own home in Kenilworth, built there in 1893. It was one of about 40 homes he designed in the area. Along with the homes he also designed the entrance to the village as well as a number of other public embellishments. In addition to Kenilworth, one of the largest concentrations of his work is along Hutchinson Street, on Chicago's North Side lakefront.

From the start of his career, Maher wrote about his views on architecture and was active in organizations interested in exploring new ideas in architecture and design. In 1887 Inland Architect published a paper he had written titled "Originality in American Architecture," one of the first of many he would write. In 1895 an interest in the English Arts and Crafts Movement led him to become one of the founding members of The Chicago Arts and Crafts Society. During his career, he was involved as a leading figure in the meetings and exhibitions of the Chicago Architectural Club, a group that was at the center of activity of the Prairie movement in Chicago.

=== Early work ===
Maher's early work during the 1890s reflected the influence of Silsbee and H.H. Richardson as well as Louis Sullivan and others of the Chicago School.

In 1893 Maher met J.L. Cochran who was developing the community of Edgewater which would ultimately become part of Chicago. During the next several years Maher designed a series of houses for Cochran which helped establish Maher's career and reputation.

Commissioned in 1897, one of Maher's most important designs is the John Farson House in Oak Park, Illinois, also known as Pleasant Home. In this house, Maher synthesized his own version of what would ultimately come to be called the Prairie School style of architecture. One of the earliest Prairie style buildings, its design concept proved to be extremely influential in its time and was widely copied throughout the Midwest.

=== Residential and university work ===
Over the years Maher designed numerous houses for clients ranging from middle class businessmen to wealthy society figures. The success of the Farson house led to a number of large commissions. Among his clients was James A. Patten for whom he built a large mansion in 1901. Patten was also responsible for getting Maher the commission to design the original Patten Gymnasium at Northwestern University where Maher also designed the Swift Hall of Engineering. Also in 1901, Maher was hired to remodel the Nickerson House which currently houses the Driehaus Museum. These were followed by the design of a large estate for Harry Rubens that was built in Glencoe, Illinois in 1903. Jens Jensen designed the landscaping for the Rubens estate. Other projects include the P.J. King House from 1901, the Rath House in 1907, and the Colvin House in 1909, all of which have been designated Chicago Landmarks by the city.

By the time of the Farson House commission, Maher was one of the first of the Prairie Style architects to have developed a personal style. By 1897, with almost a full decade behind him, his career was well established. With Wright's Prairie houses still several years in the future, Maher's version of the Prairie style came at a time when Louis Sullivan's work was still the dominant influence for the developing group of architects. While many of the others worked directly for Wright or Sullivan, Maher never did which may be part of the reason his design work would follow a more independent path throughout his career.

Around 1904 Maher's designs started to show more of his interest in ideas derived from contemporary European design, especially the English Arts and Crafts movement and the Vienna Secession. Assimilating these influences into concepts of his own, he created designs that set his work apart at a time when Wright's work was becoming increasingly influential among his contemporaries. Among these projects was the Corbin House in 1904 followed by houses such as the Erwin House (1905), the Lackner House (1905) and the Schultz House (1907).

==== Motif-Rhythm theory ====
As part of his design philosophy Maher developed what he called Motif-Rhythm theory in an attempt to produce a design unity throughout the building and its interior. This involved using a decorative element, often a local flower, a geometric shape, or a combination of the two which would be repeated throughout the design. Maher wrote that "there must be evolved certain leading forms that will influence the detail of the design; these forms crystallize during the progress of the planning and become the motifs that bind the design together." At Rockledge, the 12,000-square-foot (1,100 m^{2}) summer house he designed in 1911 for Ernest and Grace King in Homer, Minnesota, Maher was also commissioned to design the interior furnishings for the house allowing him to use the Motif-Rhythm theory to the fullest extent possible. Ultimately the house fell into disuse but before the house was demolished the furniture, clocks, lamps, rugs, even the tableware that Maher had designed were sold with many pieces ending up in various museum collections as examples of Arts and Crafts design.

=== Commercial and institutional buildings ===
While Maher is known for his residential work, he also designed commercial and institutional buildings. His client James Patten was responsible for getting Maher the commission to design the most well known of these, the original Patten Gymnasium (1908–09) at Northwestern University where Maher also designed the Swift Hall of Engineering (1908). Other notable projects were several buildings for the J. R. Watkins Medical Company (1911) including their administrative headquarters in Winona, Minnesota. These were followed by the Winona Saving Bank which was designed and built in 1914–16.

The momentum of the Prairie School movement began to rapidly decline in the mid teens as clients' tastes and interests changed, forcing many of its followers to turn in other directions. For some, including Maher, it meant increasing pressure to design in the eclectic styles then in vogue.

=== Organizations ===
Throughout his career Maher was involved in organizations seeking to improve the architecture profession. In addition to the Chicago Architectural Club, he was active in the state chapter of the American Institute of Architects serving as state chapter president in 1918. Just as Maher had worked for Silsbee whose office had produced a number of architects that went on to have distinguished careers, Maher's office also produced several notable architects including his son Phillip Brooks Maher and Robert Seyfarth.

After his World War I, his son joined the office as a partner and the firm became known as "George W. Maher & Son". In the early 1920s Maher designed multiple buildings and landscapes throughout the Chicago area and in Gary, Indiana where the firm produced a number of projects. His final work was commissioned by the Gary Heat, Light, and Water Company of Gary, Indiana. They requested him to design a new warehouse. This design embodied the last set of drawings to hold his name and architectural registration.

=== Death ===
By the time of his death he had designed over 270 projects, from houses to parks to public buildings. He committed suicide on September 12, 1926, after several years of declining health, including hospitalization for depression in 1924–25. He was 61.

== Work ==
- Frank G. Ely House, Kenilworth, Illinois (1910)
- Edward C. Elliott House, Madison, Wisconsin (1910)
- Patten Gymnasium, Evanston, Illinois (1910)
- Albert B. Towers House, Chicago, Illinois (1894)
- Old Fresno Water Tower, Fresno, California (1894)
- Liederkranz Hall in Blue Island, Illinois (1897) (destroyed by fire, 1918)
- John Farson House, also called Pleasant Home, Oak Park, Illinois (1897)
- Church of Divine Humanity, Chicago, IL, 1898
- William Weber House, Blue Island, Illinois (1899)
- Henry Klein House, Blue Island, IL (1899)
- William and Helen Coffeen House, Hinsdale, Illinois (1900)
- Patrick J. King House, Chicago, Illinois (1901)
- 502 Saint Davids Avenue, Saint Davids, Pennsylvania (1896)
- James A. Patten House, Evanston, Illinois (1901) (demolished)
- Frederick Taylor Gates House, Montclair, New Jersey (1902)
- Harry Rubens Estate stables, Glencoe, Illinois (1903) (demolished)
- Harry Rubens Estate, Glencoe, Illinois (1903) (demolished)
- Stephen Henry Velie, Jr. House, Kansas City, Missouri (1904) (demolished)
- Edmund Blinn House, Pasadena, California (1905)
- Charles R. Erwin House, Oak Park, Illinois (1905)
- Francis Lackner House, Kenilworth, Illinois (1905)
- The Murdock House, Sault Ste. Marie, Michigan (1906)
- Hiram C. and Irene Stewart House, Wausau, Wisconsin (1906)
- Henry Schultz House, Winnetka, Illinois (1907)
- The John Rath House, Chicago, Illinois (1907)
- Emil Rudolph House, Highland Park, Illinois (1907)
- The Ernest J. Magerstadt House, Chicago, Illinois (1908)
- The Martin Baldwin House, Glen Ridge, New Jersey (1908)
- Edward Colvin House, Chicago, Illinois (1909)
- Administration building for the J.R. Watkins Medical Company, Winona, Minnesota (1911)
- Claude Seymour House, Chicago, Illinois (1913)
- Winona Savings Bank Building, Winona, Minnesota (1914)
- Gary Bathing Beach Aquatorium, Gary, Indiana (1921)

== Gallery ==
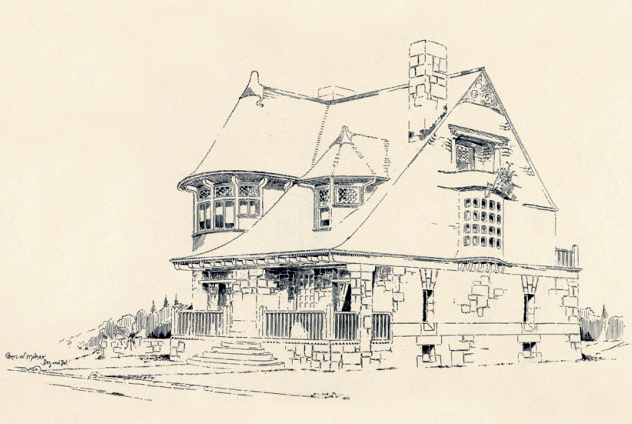
Gilman House in Chicago, Illinois, 1888, demolished

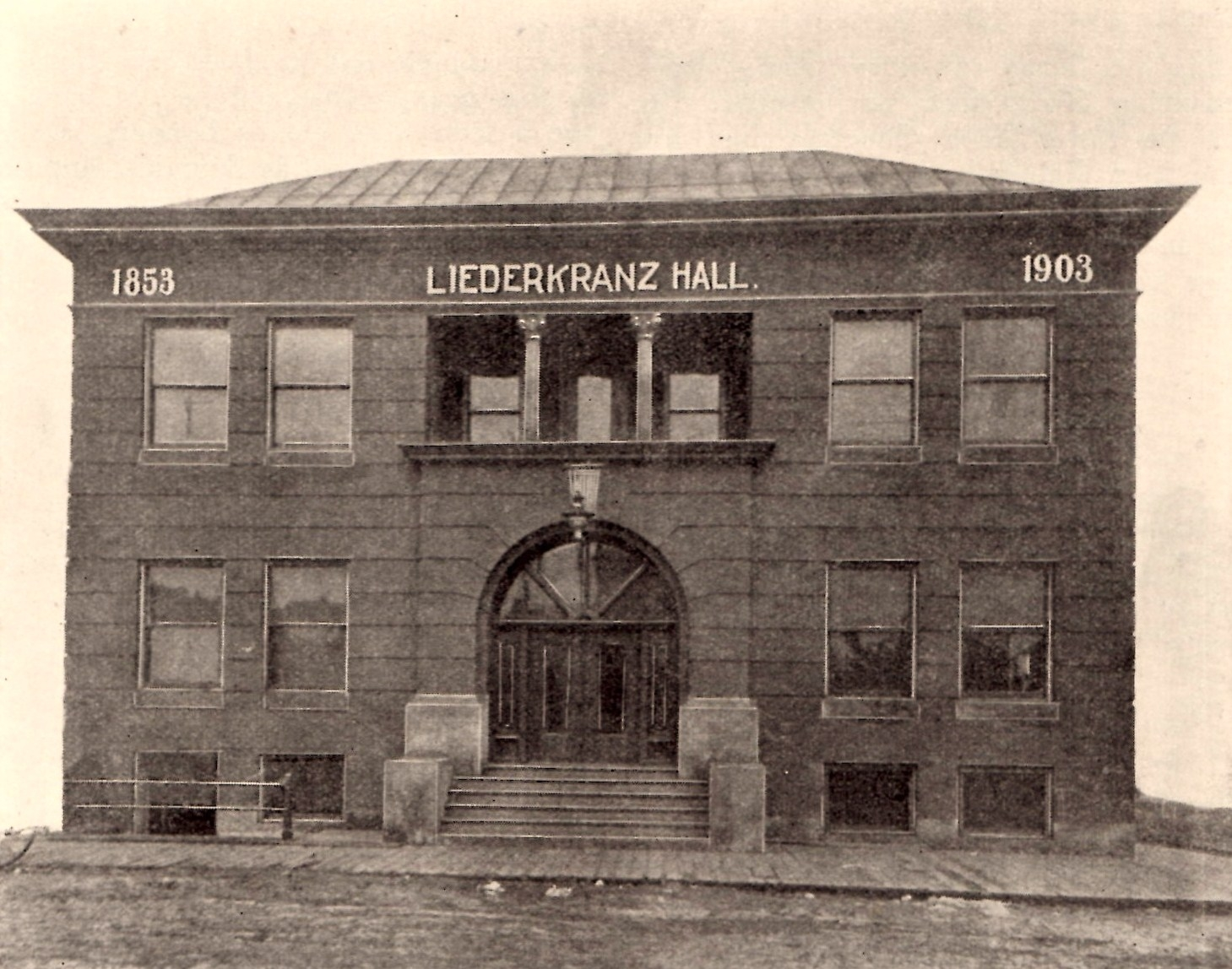
Liederkranz Hall in Blue Island, Illinois, 1897, destroyed by fire

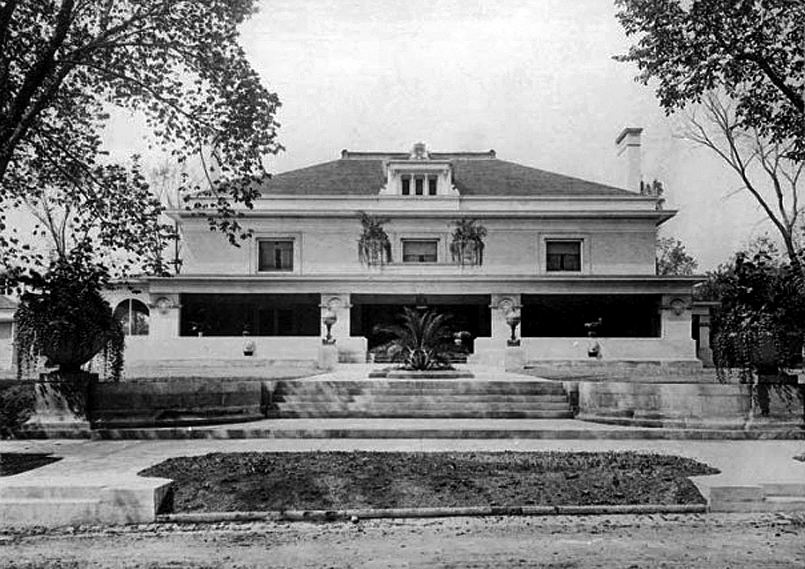
The John Farson House, also called Pleasant Home, Oak Park Illinois, 1897

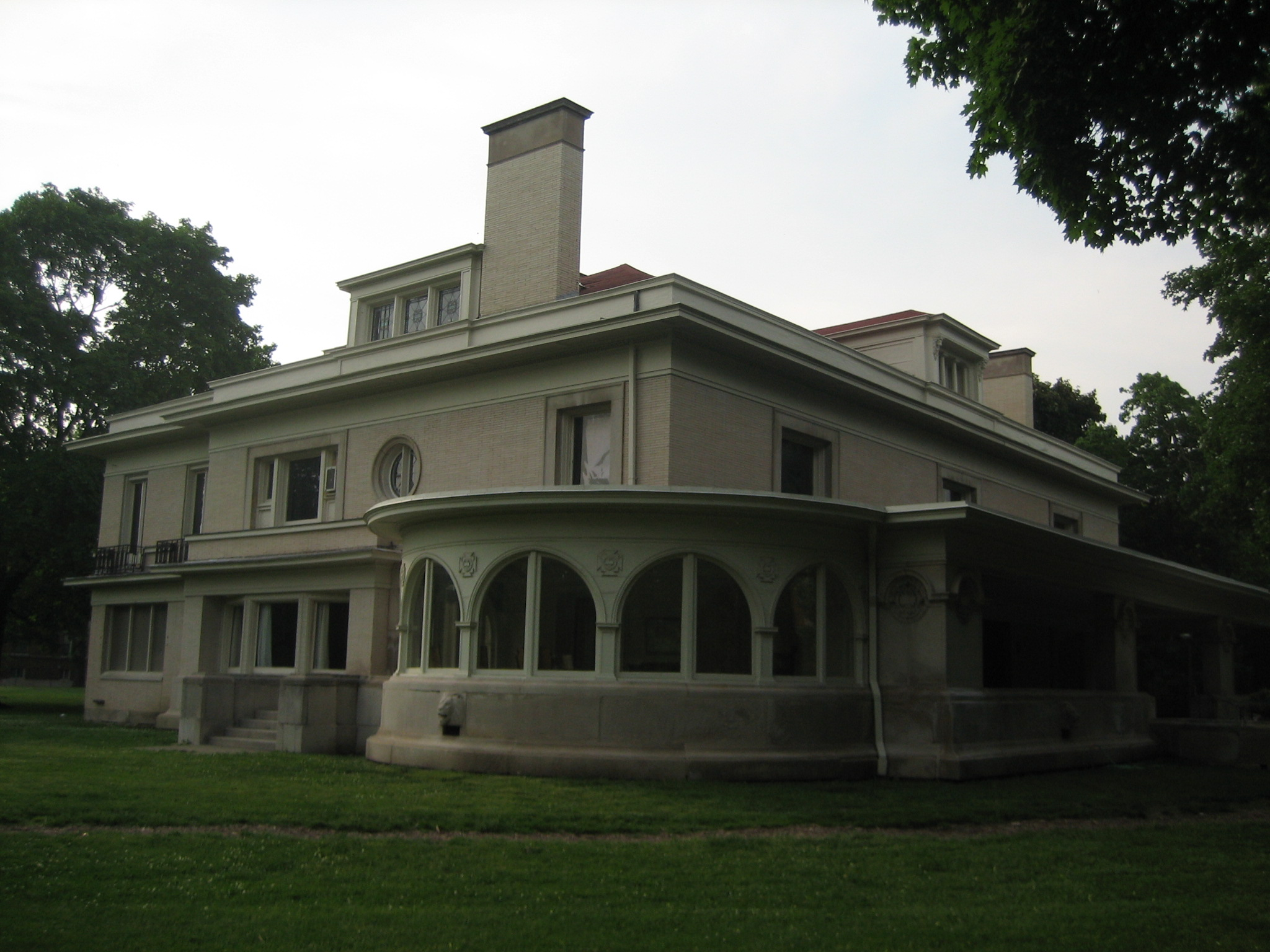
John Farson House, Oak Park, Illinois, 1897

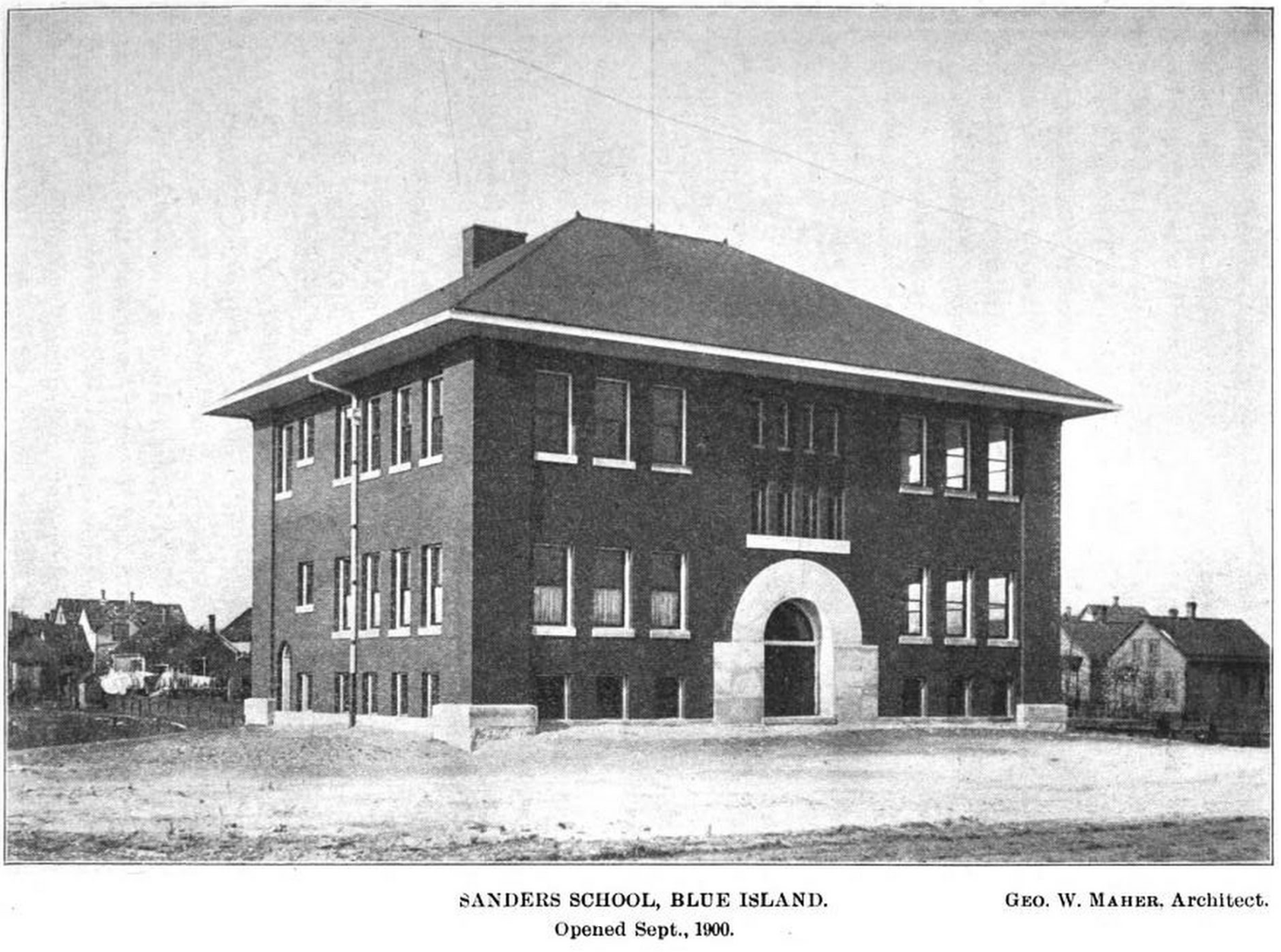
Sanders School, Blue Island, Illinois, 1900

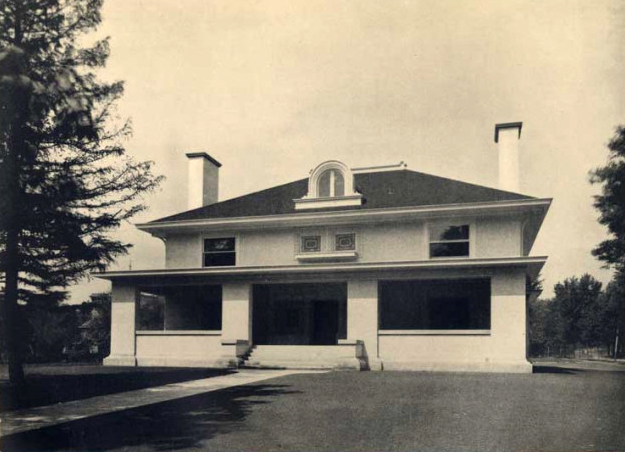
William and Helen Coffeen House in Hinsdale, Illinois, 1900

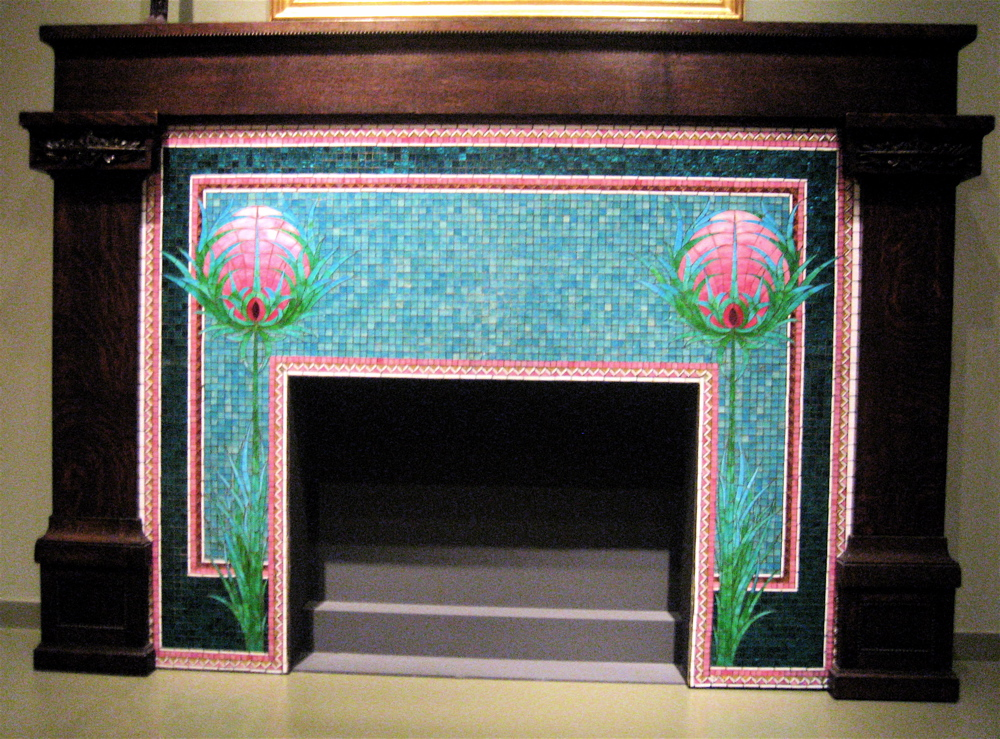
Fireplace mantle from the Patrick J. King House, Chicago, Illinois, 1901

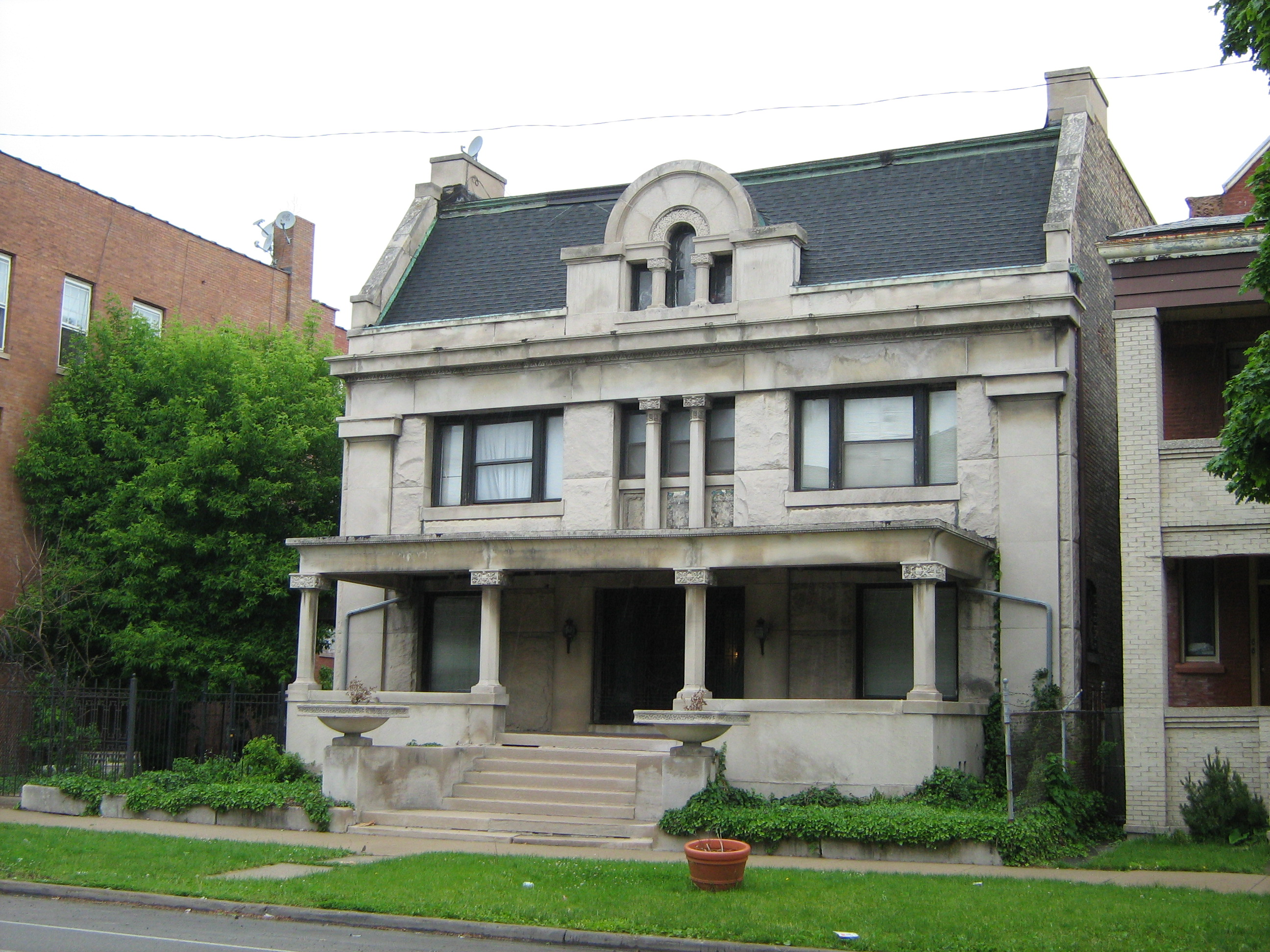
Patrick J. King House, Chicago, Illinois, 1901

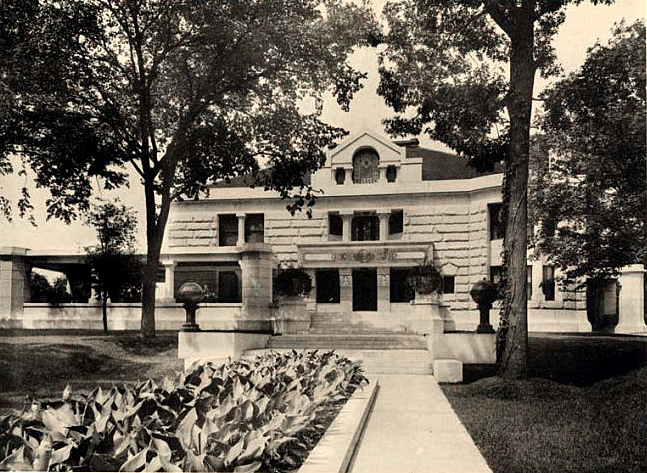
James A. Patten House, Evanston, Illinois, 1901, demolished

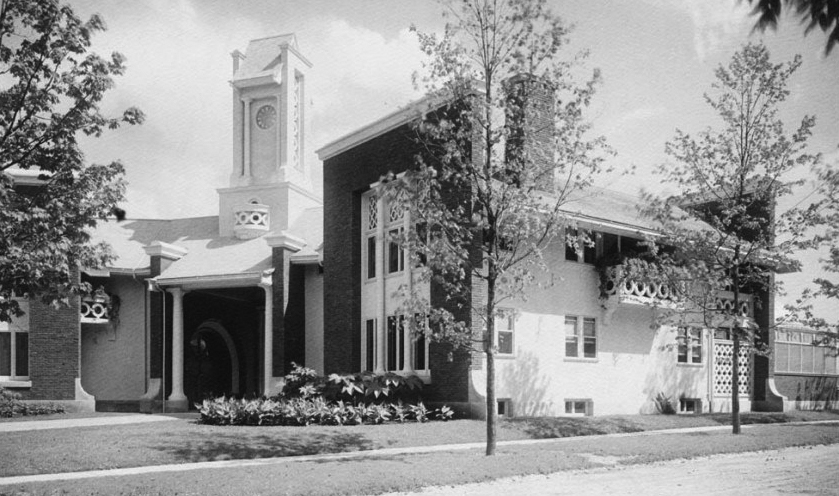
Harry Rubens Estate stables, Glencoe, Illinois, 1903, demolished

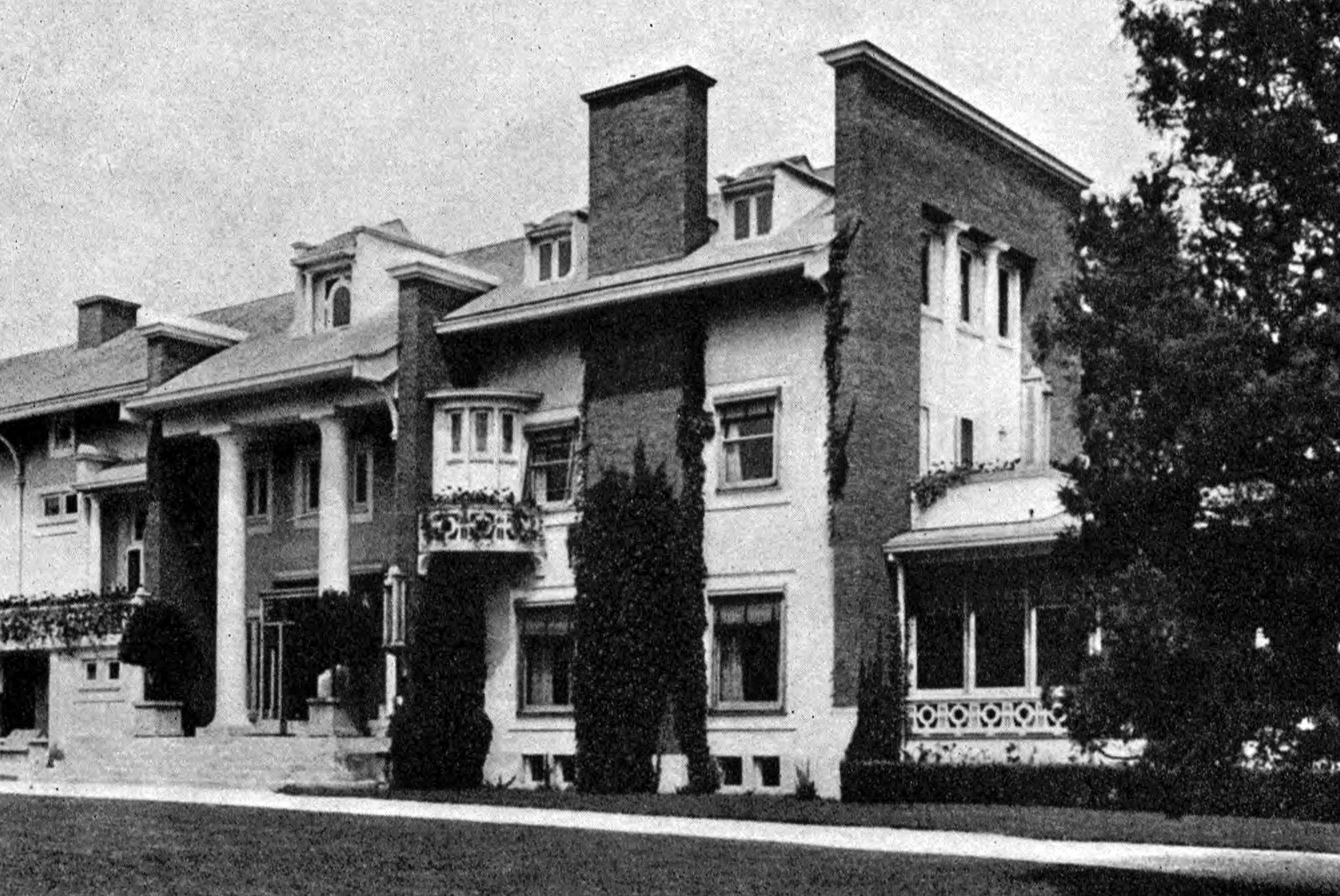
Harry Rubens Estate, Glencoe, Illinois, 1903, demolished

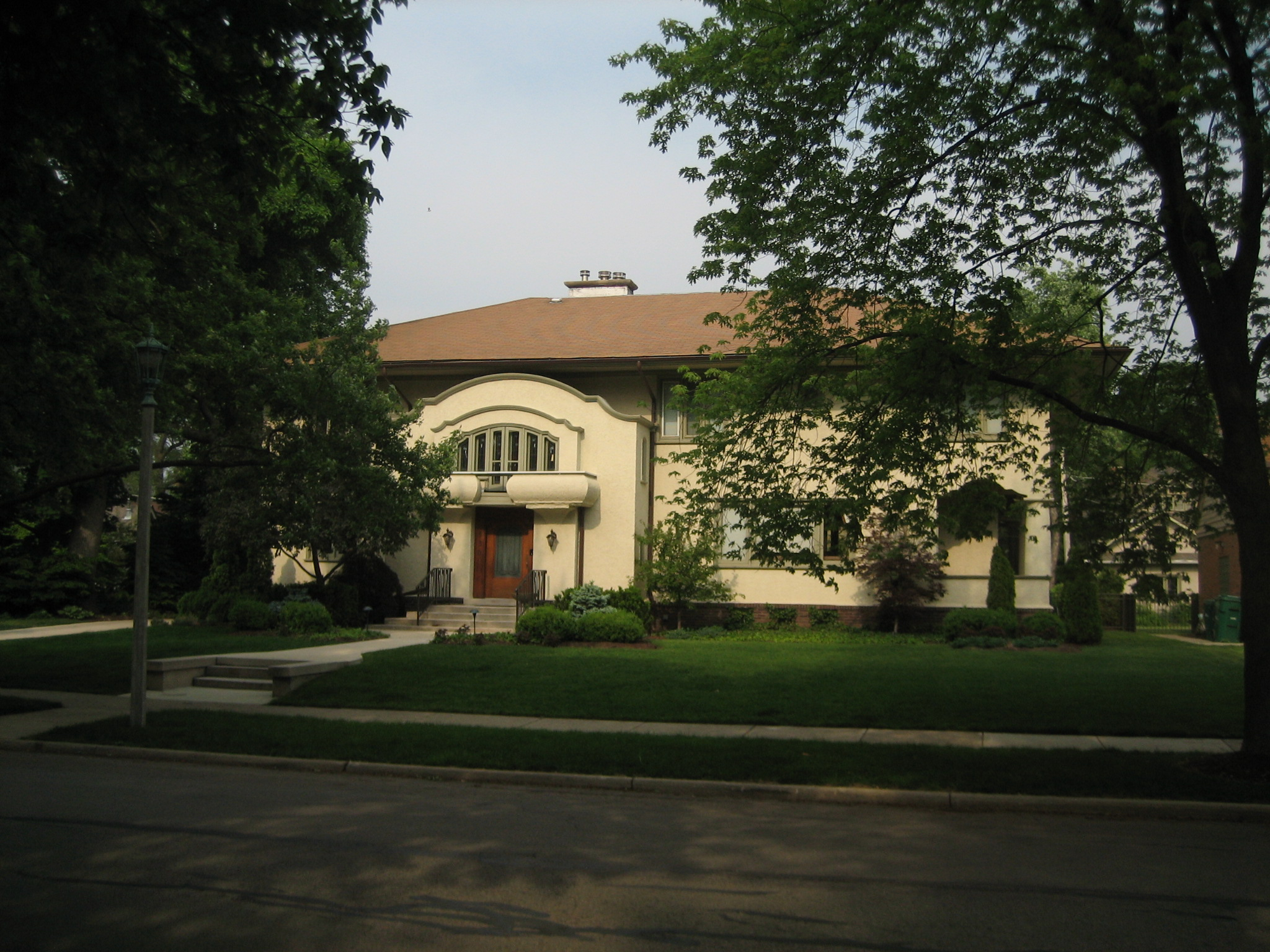
Charles R. Erwin House, Oak Park, Illinois, 1905

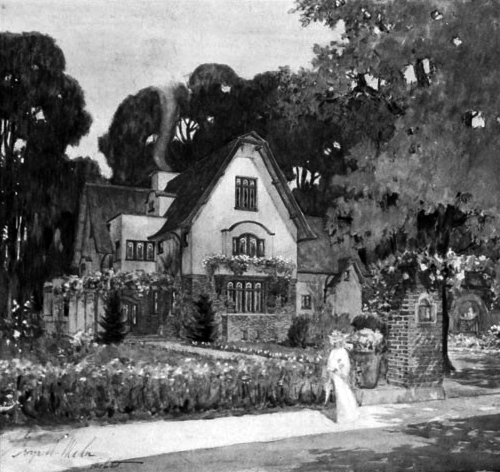
Francis Lackner House, Kenilworth, Illinois, 1905

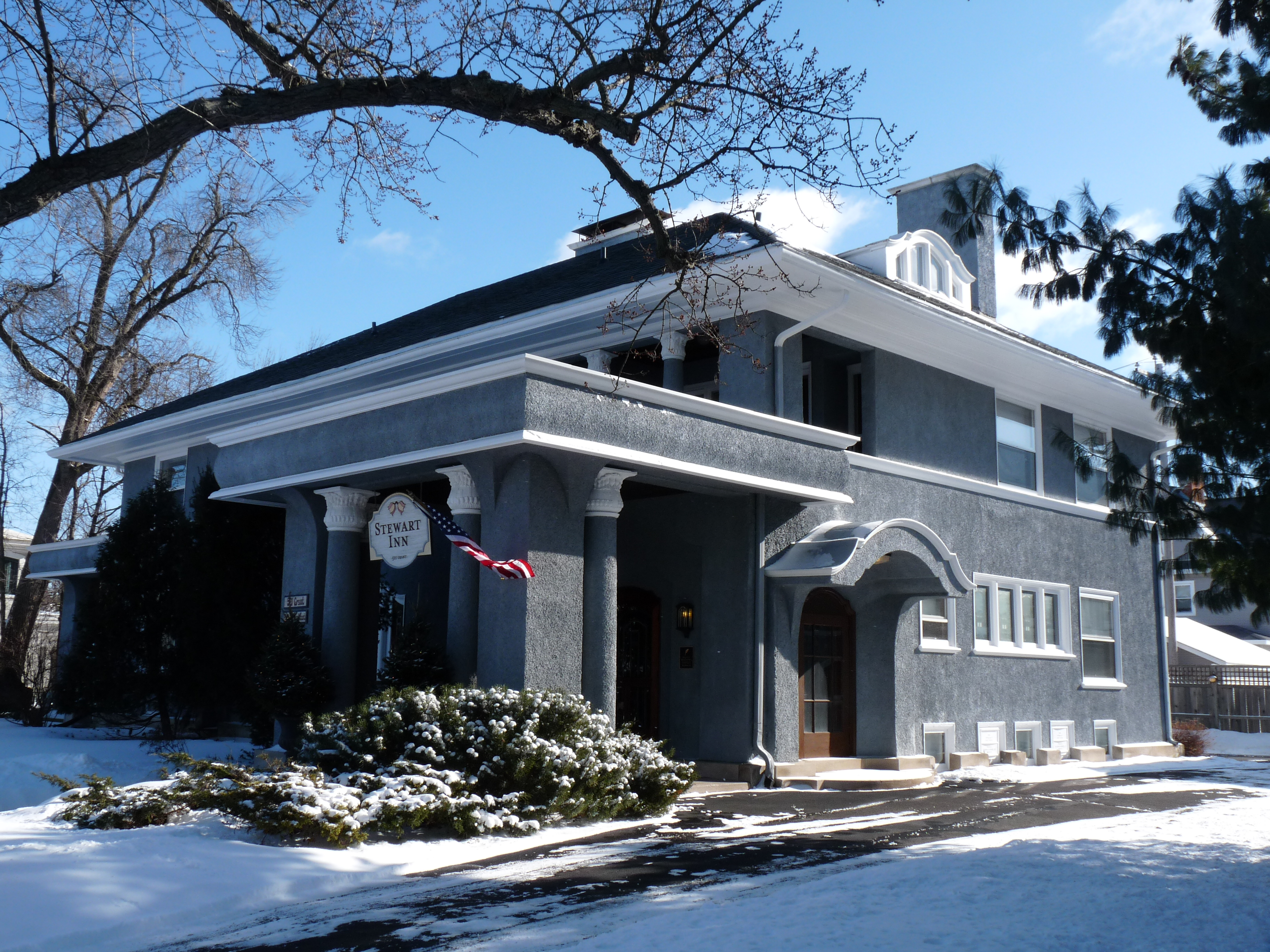
Hiram C. and Irene Stewart House, Wausau, Wisconsin, 1906

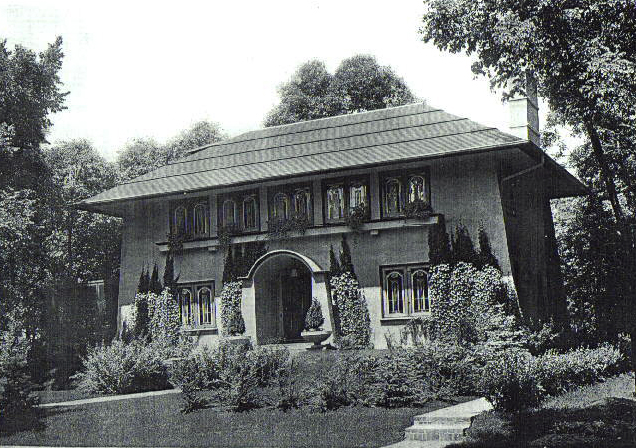
Henry Schultz House, Winnetka, Illinois, 1907

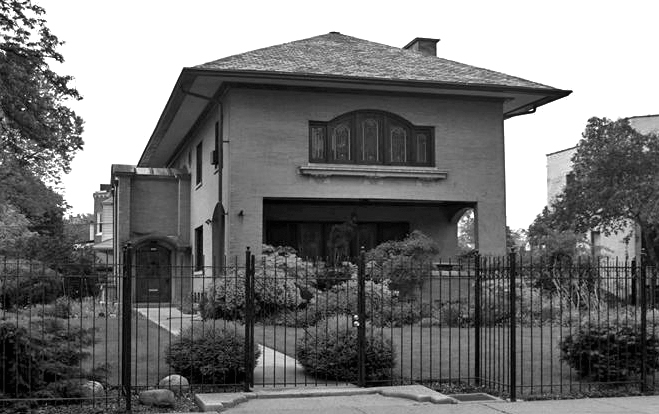
John Rath House, Chicago, Illinois, 1907

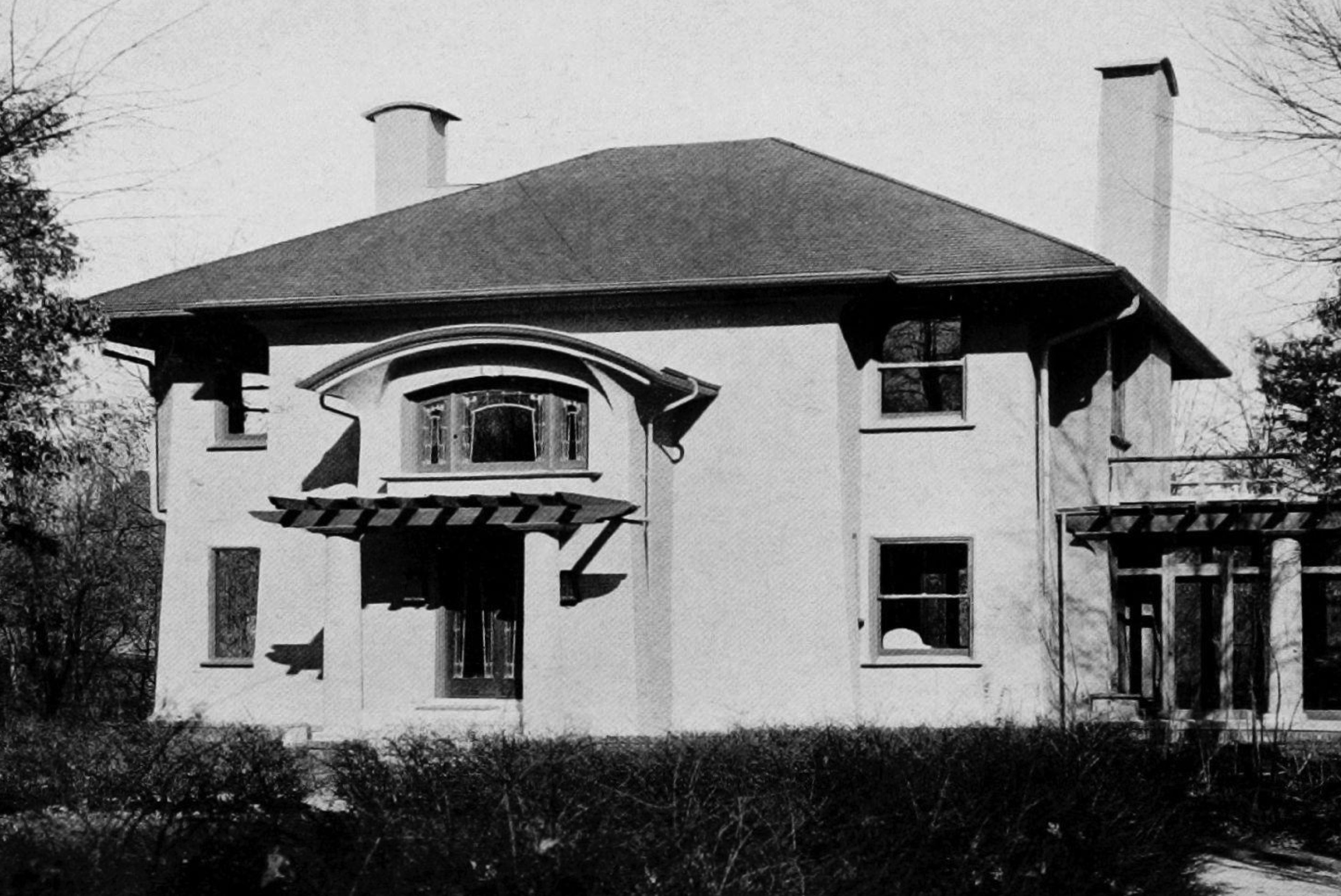
Emil Rudolph House, Highland Park, Illinois, 1907

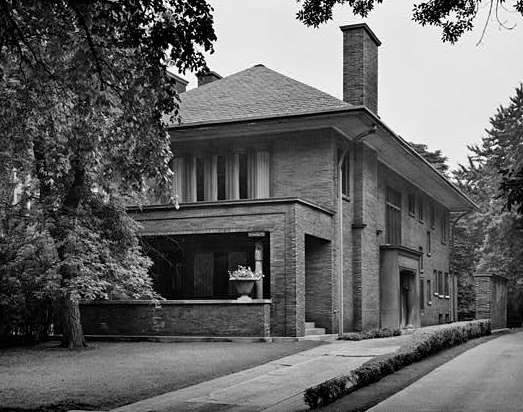
Ernest J. Magerstadt House, Chicago, Illinois, 1908

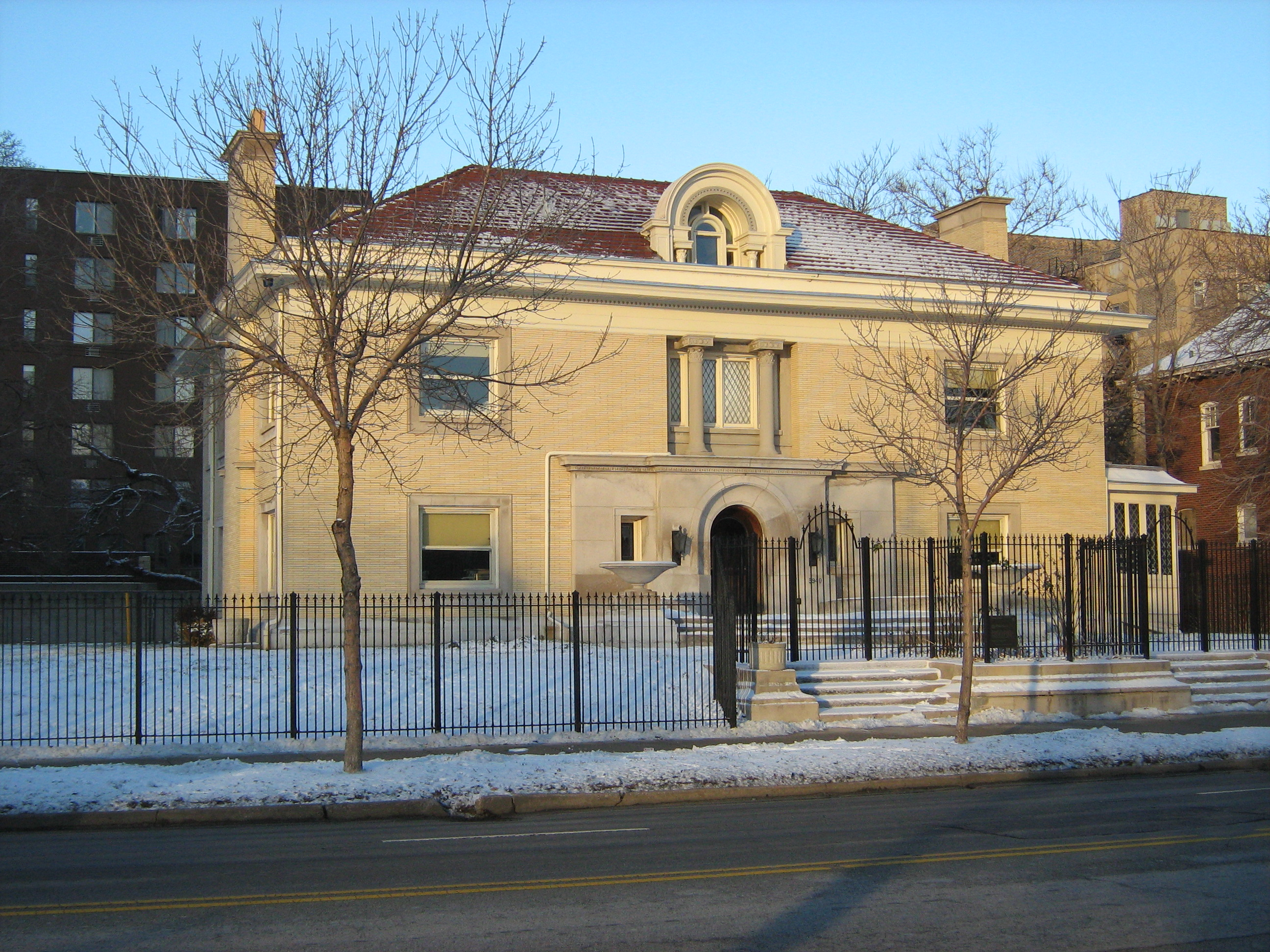
Edward Colvin House, Chicago, Illinois. 1909

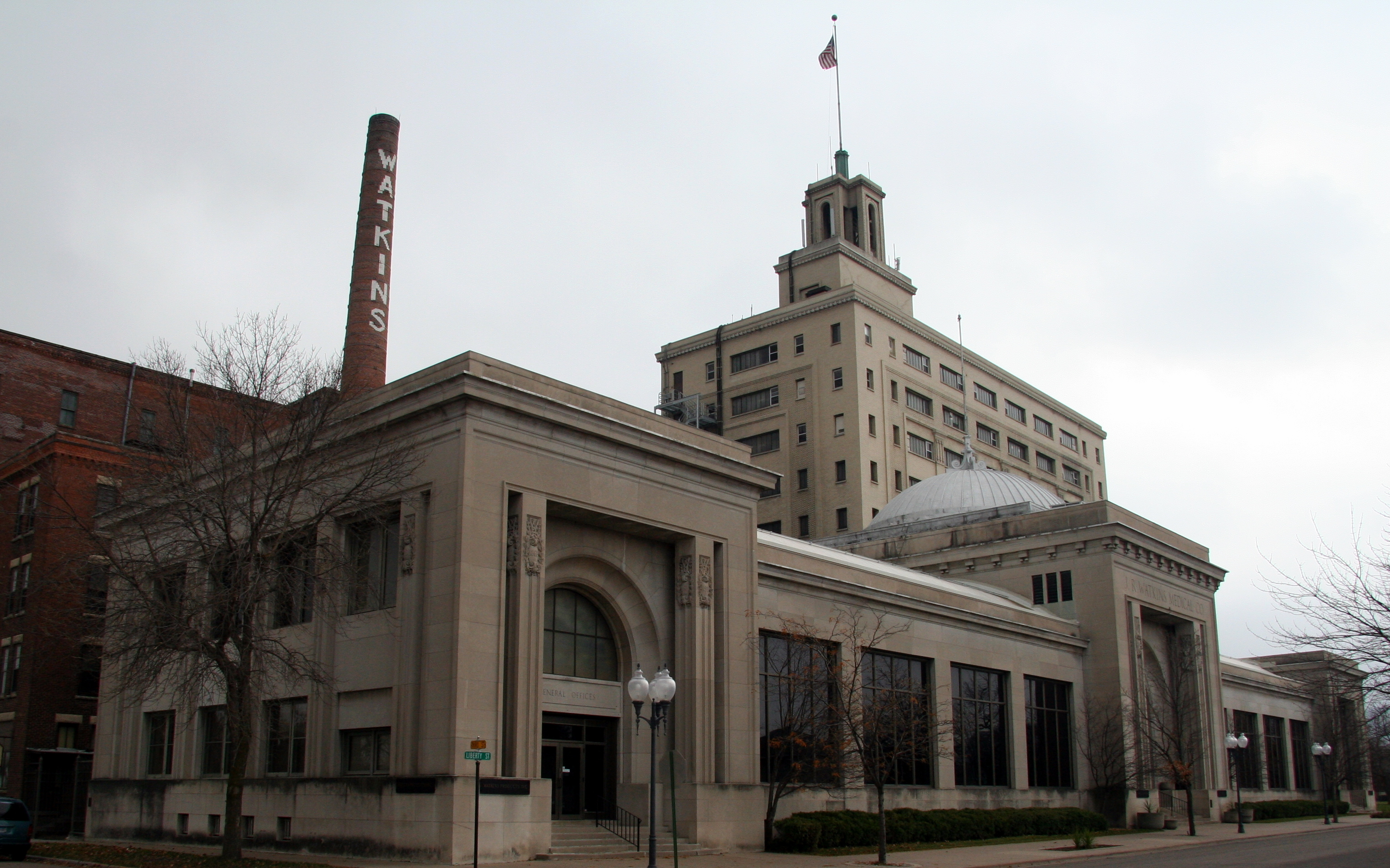
Administration building for the J.R. Watkins Medical Company, Winona, Minnesota, 1911

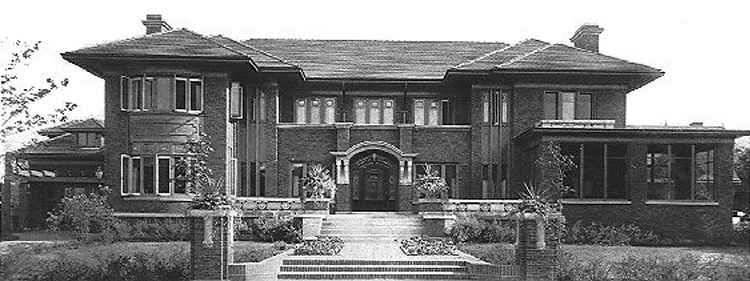
Claude Seymour House, Chicago Illinois, 1913

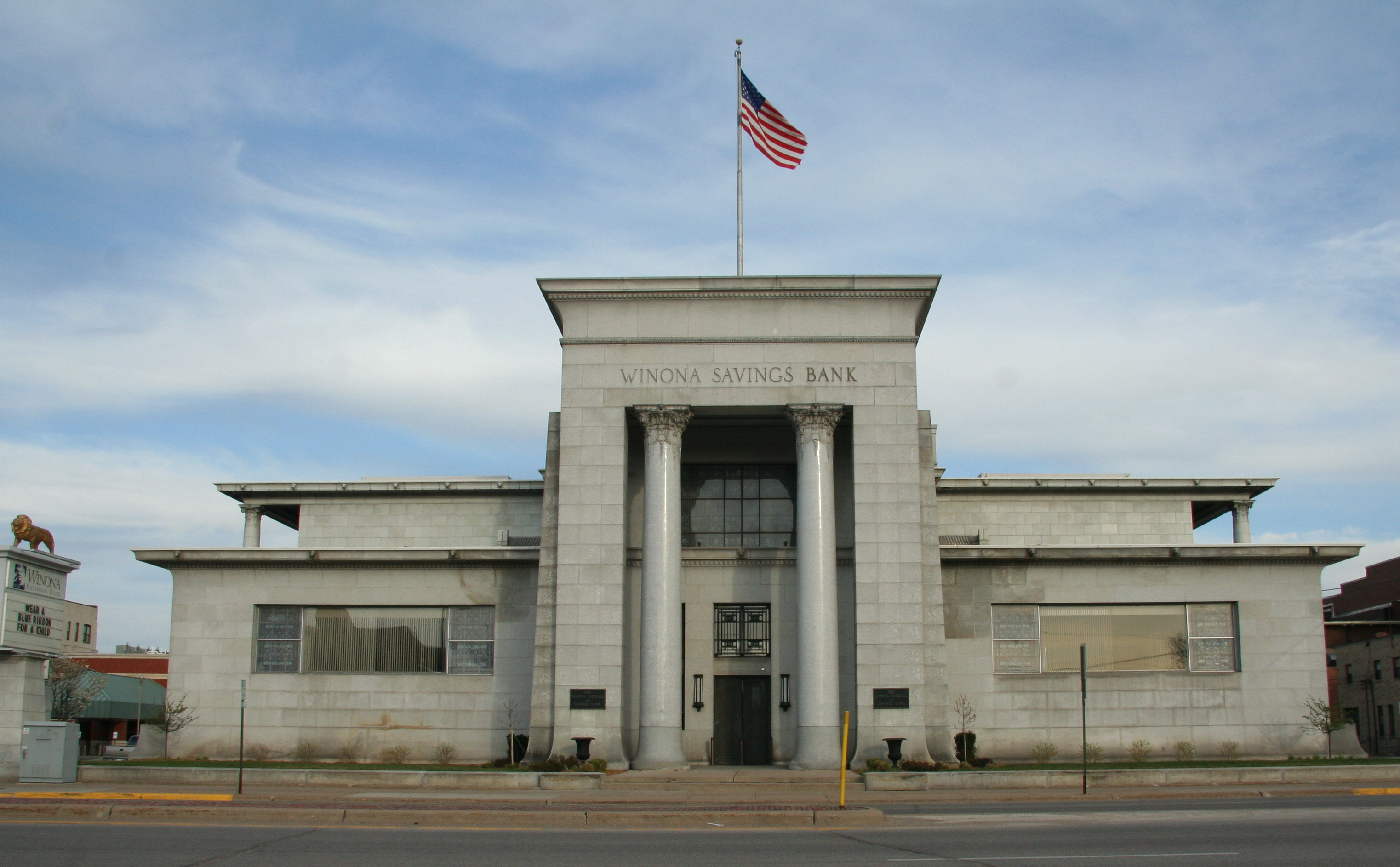
Winona Savings Bank, Winona, Minnesota, 1914

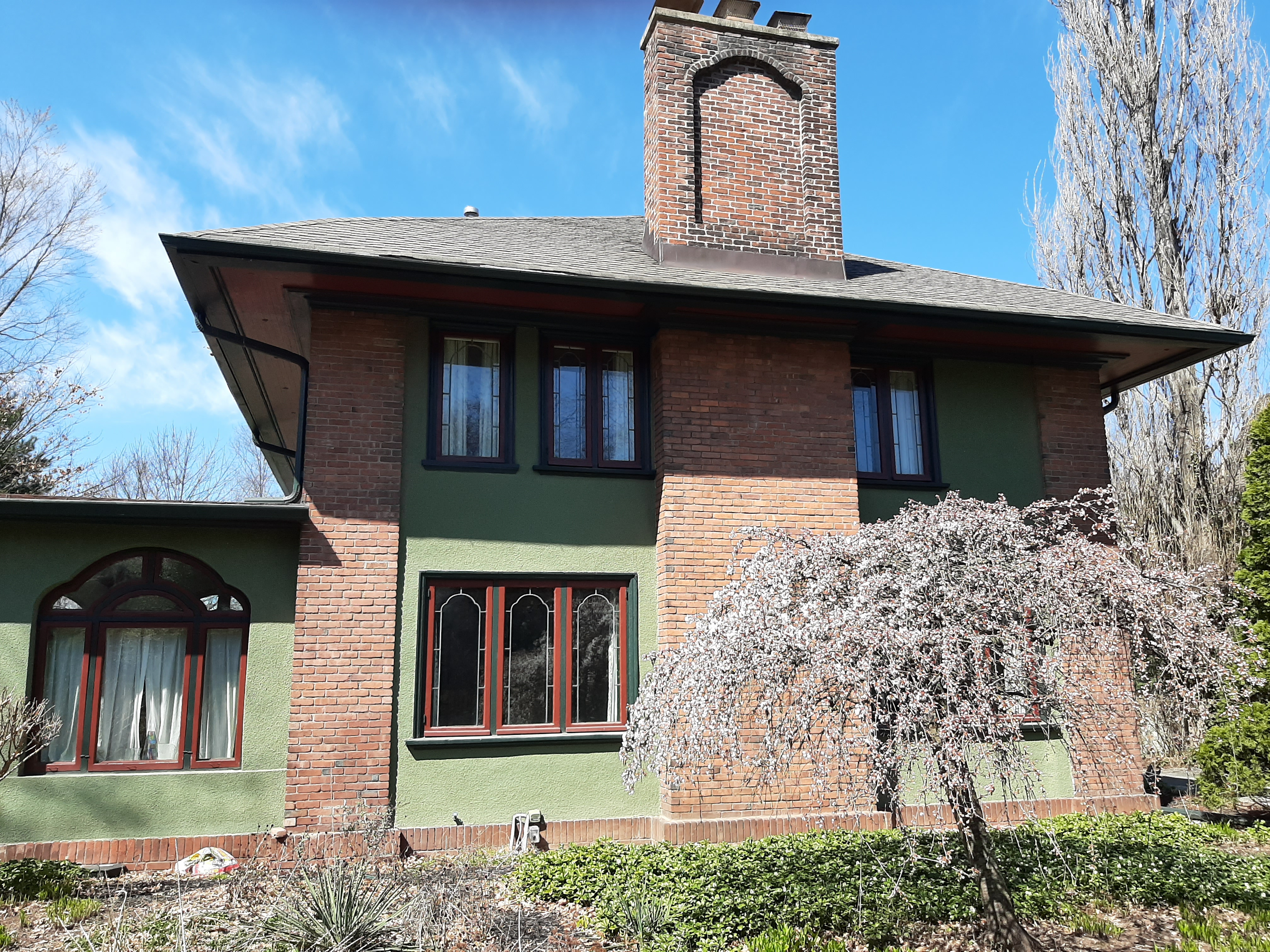
Martin Baldwin House, Glen Ridge, NJ 1908

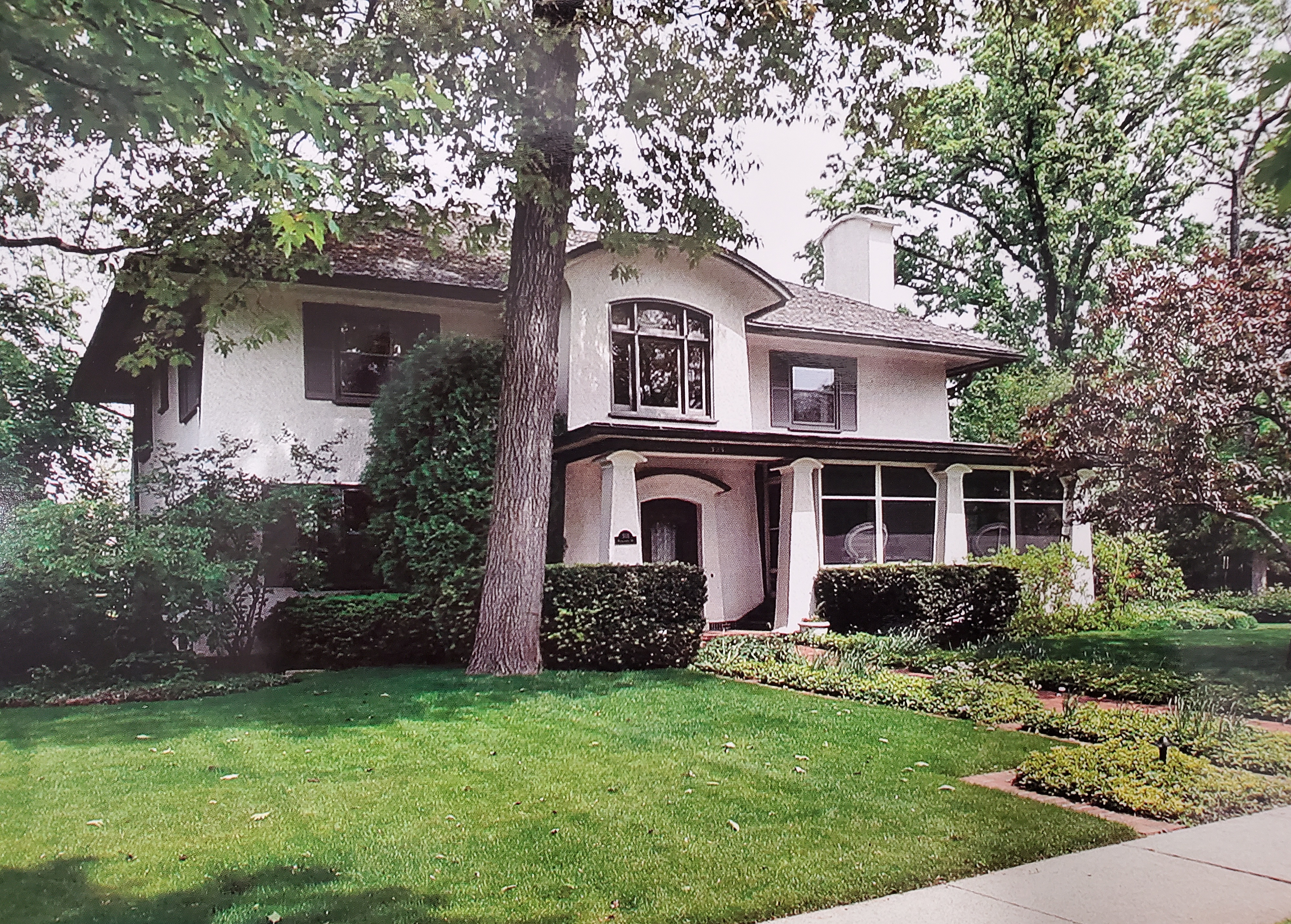
Frank G. Ely House, Kenilworth, Illinois, 1910

== See also ==
- Edmund Blinn House
- Watkins Incorporated
