= Charles Ross House =

Charles Ross House ("Forest House")
- Location within Wisconsin

General information
- Type: House
- Architectural style: Prairie School
- Location: Delavan, Wisconsin
- Coordinates: 42.597634°N 88.606230°W
- Construction started: 1902
- Governing body: Private

Design and construction
- Architect: Frank Lloyd Wright

The Charles Ross House (also known as the Forest House) is a house designed by architect Frank Lloyd Wright in 1902 on the south shore of Lake Delavan in Walworth County, Wisconsin. The home is known as one of the finest examples of Frank Lloyd Wright's Prairie style design, as well as a prime example of Wright's dismembering of the traditional box. The Charles Ross House was constructed in 1902 by members from the Prairie School.

== History ==
Around the turn of the 20th century, wealthy families from Chicago flocked to scenic destinations in Wisconsin for summer vacation. Wright designed a handful of lakeside cottages during this time, the Charles Ross summerhouse among them. The house retains many of the characteristics that are shared by other of Wright's nearby cottages, including board and batten siding, hipped roofs, and ribbon windows situated just below widely projecting soffits. This home features a hipped roof with overhanging eaves, a large lakeside patio, a water tower, a central fireplace, 6 bedrooms, 6.2 baths, and a 2 bedroom guest apartment. Like with many of Wright's homes, the entryway is not obvious, the ceilings are lower as Wright was a shorter man, and the lead windows are embedded with Wright' signature double grid with orange panes.

The house is cruciform in plan and, rather than simply expanding the openings between the house's rooms to create a sense of free-flowing space—as he did in his Shingle style designs—Wright began to eliminate traditional room divisions by breaking down the box-like contours of house's interior spaces. The dining and living rooms, for instance, penetrate one another on an angle, creating a dynamic relationship and oblique views that anticipate the complex spatial arrangements found in Wright's Ward Willits house and other of his more advanced prairie-style designs.

Today, the home still remains a private residence. The house is occasionally open to the public as part of the Wright in Wisconsin program of guided educational tours.

== See also ==
- List of Frank Lloyd Wright works
- Fred B. Jones House, another Wright Prairie style residence

== Bibliography ==
- Storrer, William Allin (1993). The Frank Lloyd Wright Companion. Chicago: University of Chicago Press. ISBN 978-0-226-77624-8. (S.082)
- Brooks, H. Allen (1979). "Frank Lloyd Wright and the Destruction of the Box". Journal of the Society of Architectural Historians. 38 (1): 7–14. doi:10.2307/989345. JSTOR 989345.
- Visser, Kristin. Frank Lloyd Wright & the Prairie School in Wisconsin. Madison, Wis.: Prairie Oak Press, 1998 (Second Edition), pp. 90–91.
