= William G. Fricke House =

House in Oak Park, Illinois

Coordinates: 41.8962°N 87.7877°W

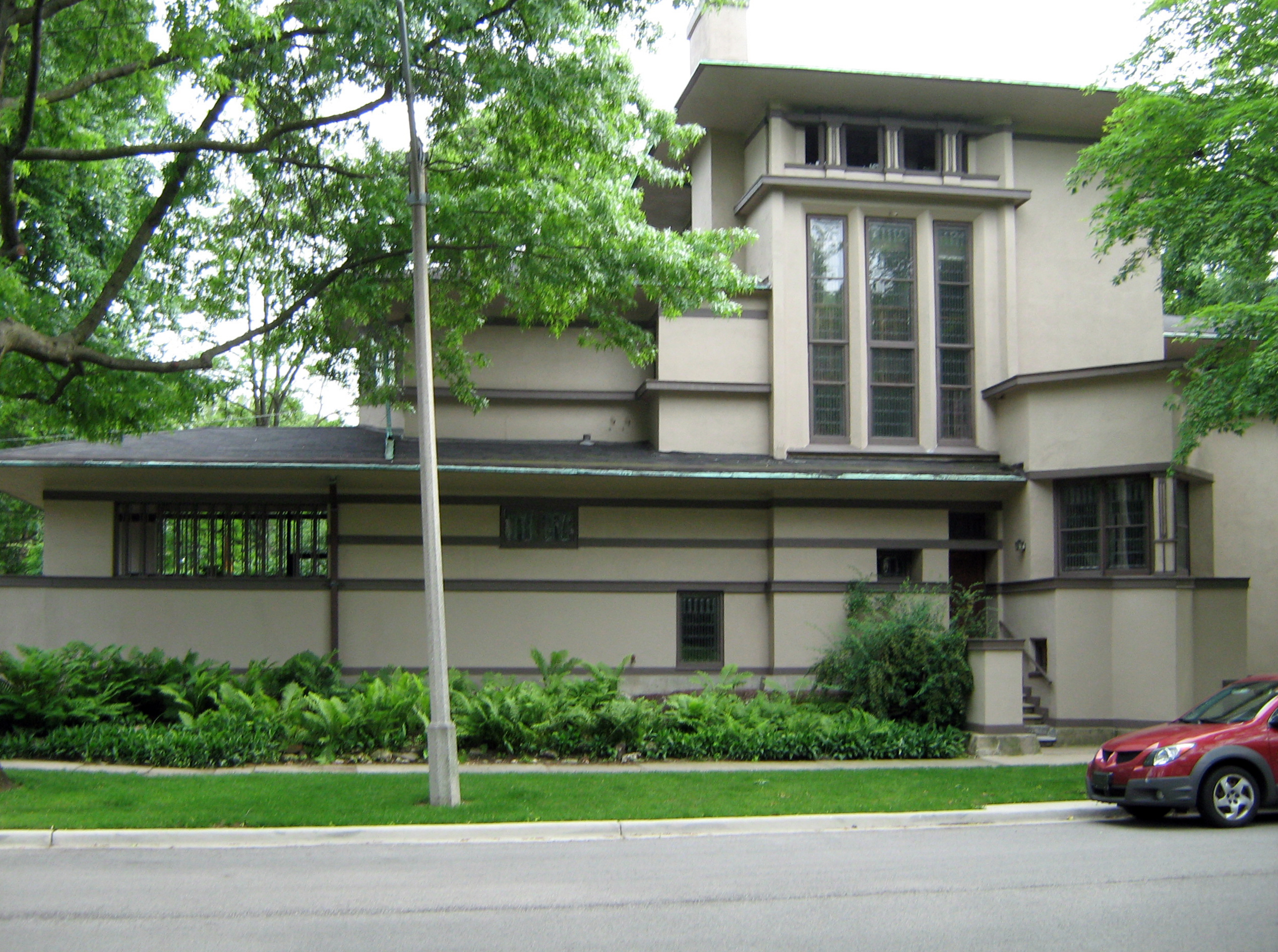
The William G. Fricke House in 2009

The William G. Fricke House is a home designed by American architect Frank Lloyd Wright at 540 Fair Oaks Avenue in Oak Park, Illinois, United States. Fricke commissioned the home in 1901 and it was finished the next year. Wright used elements in the building that would appear in his Prairie style homes: a high water table, horizontal banding, overhanging eaves, shallow hipped roofs, and an exterior with an expansive amount of stucco. Wright usually emphasized the horizontal in his house designs, but the Fricke house is different by having a three-story tower.

The house has been owned since 2004 by Dawn and Ed McGee.

== See also ==
- List of Frank Lloyd Wright works
