= William Palmer Residence =

House in Ann Arbor, Michigan

- U.S. National Register of Historic Places
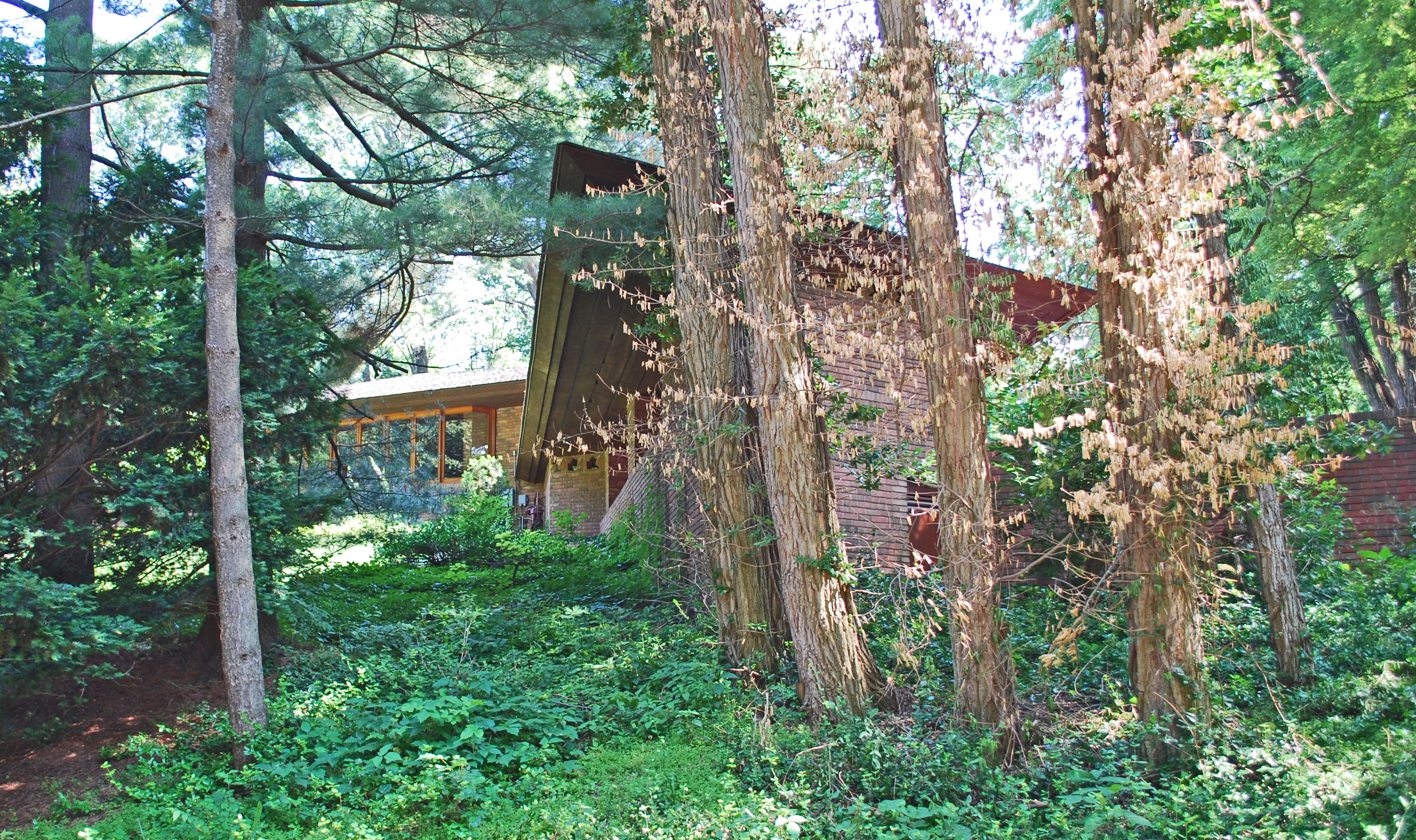

- Location within Michigan
- Interactive map
- Location: Ann Arbor, Michigan
- Coordinates: 42°16′42.92″N 83°42′56.84″W
- Built: 1952
- Architect: Frank Lloyd Wright
- Architectural style: Usonian
- NRHP reference No.: 99000340
- Added to NRHP: March 29, 1999

The William and Mary Palmer House is a house in Ann Arbor, Michigan, designed by Frank Lloyd Wright in 1952. The home was designed for William Palmer, an economics professor at the University of Michigan, and his wife Mary. It sits on three lots at the end of a quiet, dirt road cul-de-sac. The location is near the Nichols Arboretum, and less than a mile (1.2 km) from the university.

== History ==
William Palmer was born in Imlay City, Michigan, and studied economics at the University of Michigan; in 1930 he became a professor at the school. Mary Warton Shuford was born in North Carolina and enrolled in the University of Michigan's School of Music in 1935. She graduated in 1937 and married William Palmer. The couple purchased this property in 1949 and began seeking an architect to build their home. After seeing the Affleck house in Bloomfield Hills, they contacted Frank Lloyd Wright. Wright designed the house in 1950.

The house was continuously owned by the Palmer family from 1951 to 2009. It was placed on the market in early August 2008, with restrictions in place. Jeffrey and Kathryn Schox purchased the house in March 2009. Jeffrey Schox, who is a San Francisco patent attorney, spends several weeks a year in Ann Arbor. When he is not in Ann Arbor, the Palmer House will be available for rent as a guest house and as a meeting location.

== Description ==
The Palmer house is a 2,000 square-foot Usonian home. It is located in a hillside and constructed of red cypress and brick. The house has a triangular geometry, with no right angles in the structure. There is a central entryway with three wings extend off from that: a bedroom wing to on side, a living room and terrace wing to the other, and a smaller carport perpendicularly. The hipped roof is long and dramatic, with a low slope and wide overhangs extending over each wings; it is clad with cedar shingles and copper.

A small garden house to the rear contains a collection of Wright-designed furniture.

== See also ==
- List of Frank Lloyd Wright works
