= Paul Olfelt House =

Building in St. Louis Park, Minnesota

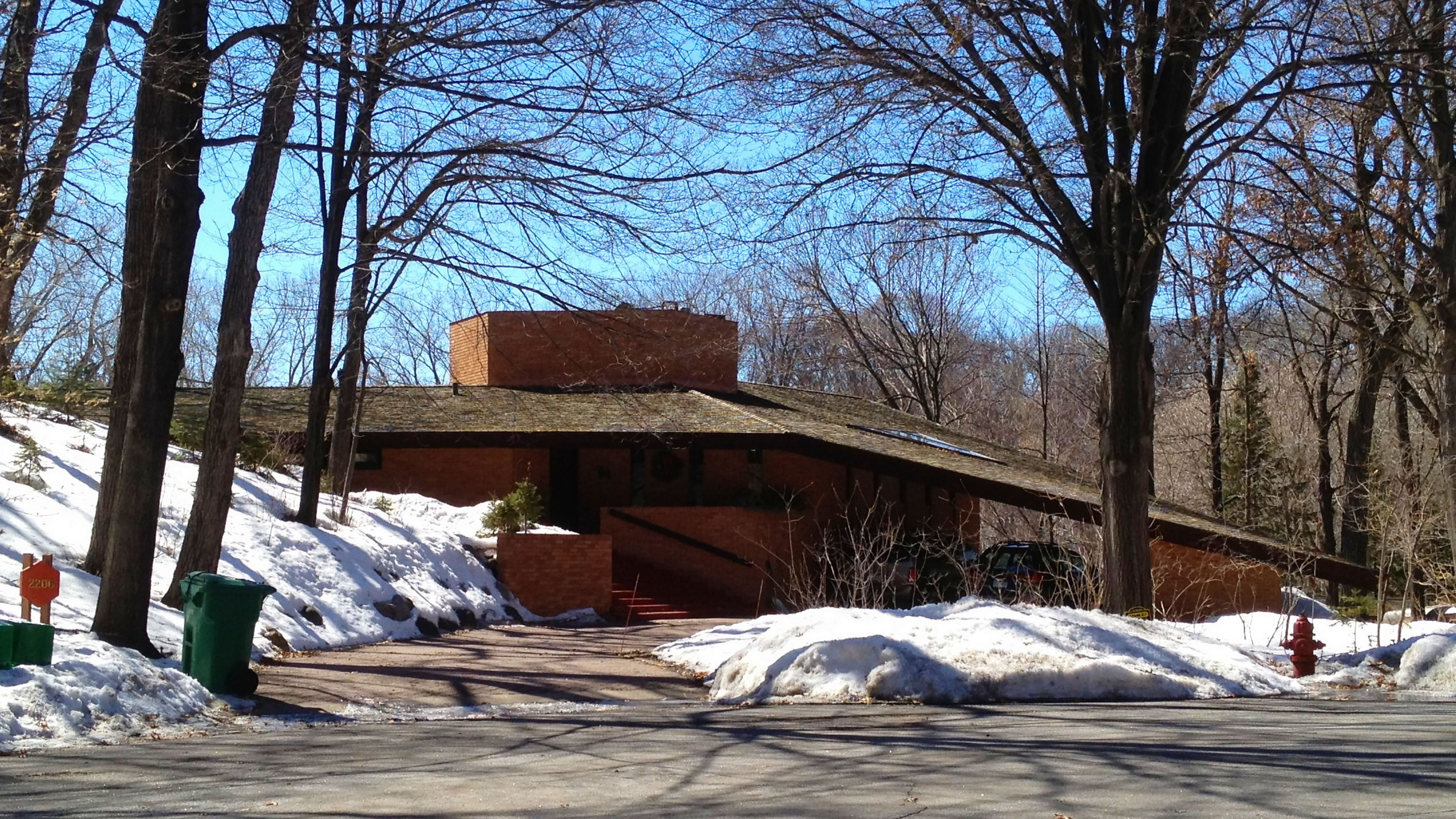

- Location within Minnesota
- Interactive map showing the location of Olfelt House

General information
- Architectural style: Usonian
- Location: 2206 Parkland Lane, St. Louis Park, Minnesota, United States
- Coordinates: 44°57′43″N 93°20′15″W
- Construction started: 1958
- Completed: 1960
- Client: Paul and Helen Olfelt
- Owner: Paul and Helen Olfelt

Technical details
- Floor count: 1

Design and construction
- Architect: Frank Lloyd Wright

Paul Olfelt House is a Usonian style house designed by Frank Lloyd Wright in St. Louis Park, Minnesota, at the outskirts of Minneapolis. It was designed in 1958 and completed in 1960 as a residence for Paul and Helen Olfelt, who commissioned both the building and the interior design from the architect.

The house, constructed mainly of brick and stone, has the area of 2,647 square feet (245.9 m^{2}) and includes three bedrooms and two bathrooms.

In 2017 the house was put up for sale for $1,395,000.00

== See also ==
- List of Frank Lloyd Wright works
