= Ravine Bluffs Development =

Development in Glencoe, Illinois

- Ravine Bluffs Development Bridge (Sylvan Road Bridge)
- U.S. National Register of Historic Places
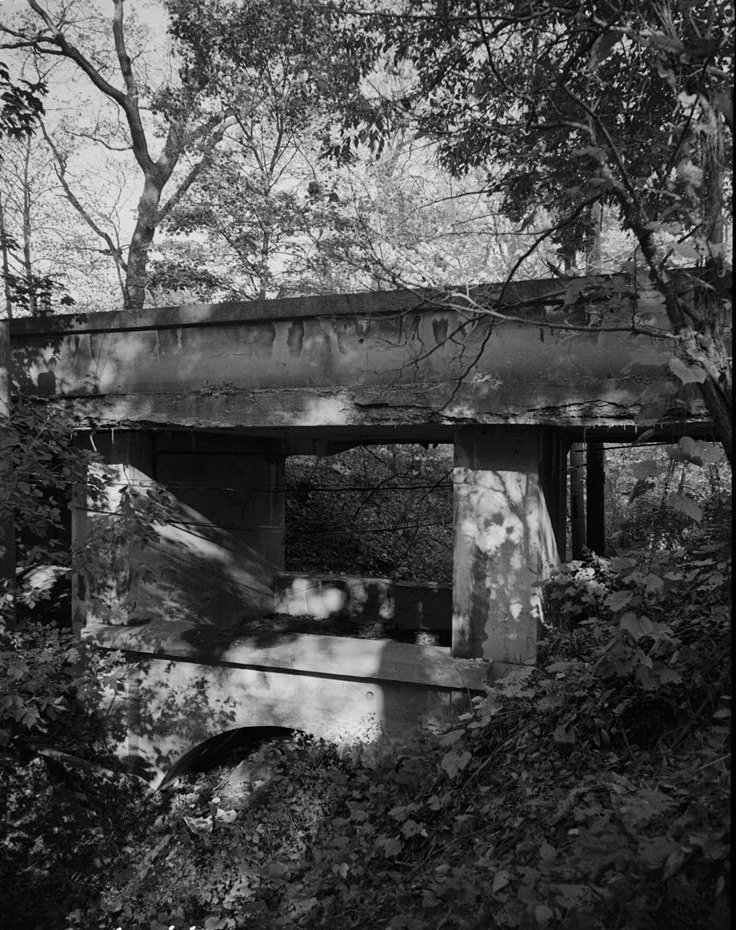

- Location within Illinois
- Location: Glencoe, Illinois
- Coordinates: 42°08′40″N 87°45′48″W
- Built: 1915, rebuilt 1985
- Architect: Frank Lloyd Wright
- Architectural style: Prairie School
- NRHP reference No.: 78001137
- Added to NRHP: June 23, 1978

The Ravine Bluffs Development was commissioned in 1915 by Frank Lloyd Wright's attorney, Sherman Booth Jr. It is located in Glencoe, Illinois. Six houses, three poured concrete sculptures, and one bridge were built. Five of the houses were for rent when built. All 5 rental houses share the same basic floor plan as "A Fireproof House for $5000".

Client's home:

- Sherman Booth House

Rentals:

- Charles R. Perry House
- Hollis R. Root House
- William F. Kier House
- Lute F. and Daniel Kissam House
- William F. Ross House - differs in design from the other 4 rentals, has fireplace to the side - was purchased by architect John Eifler and was restored from 2011-2014.
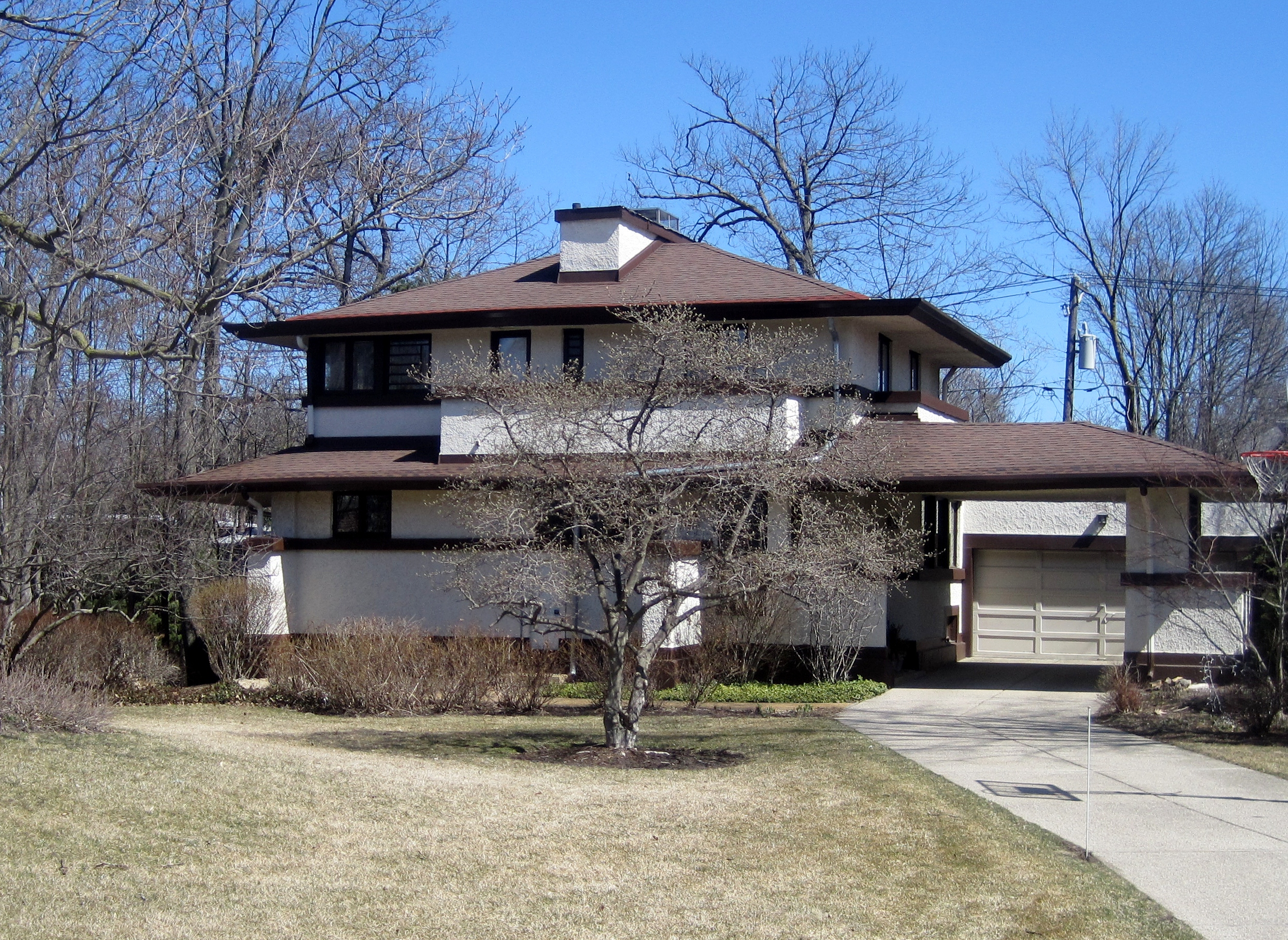
William F. Kier House

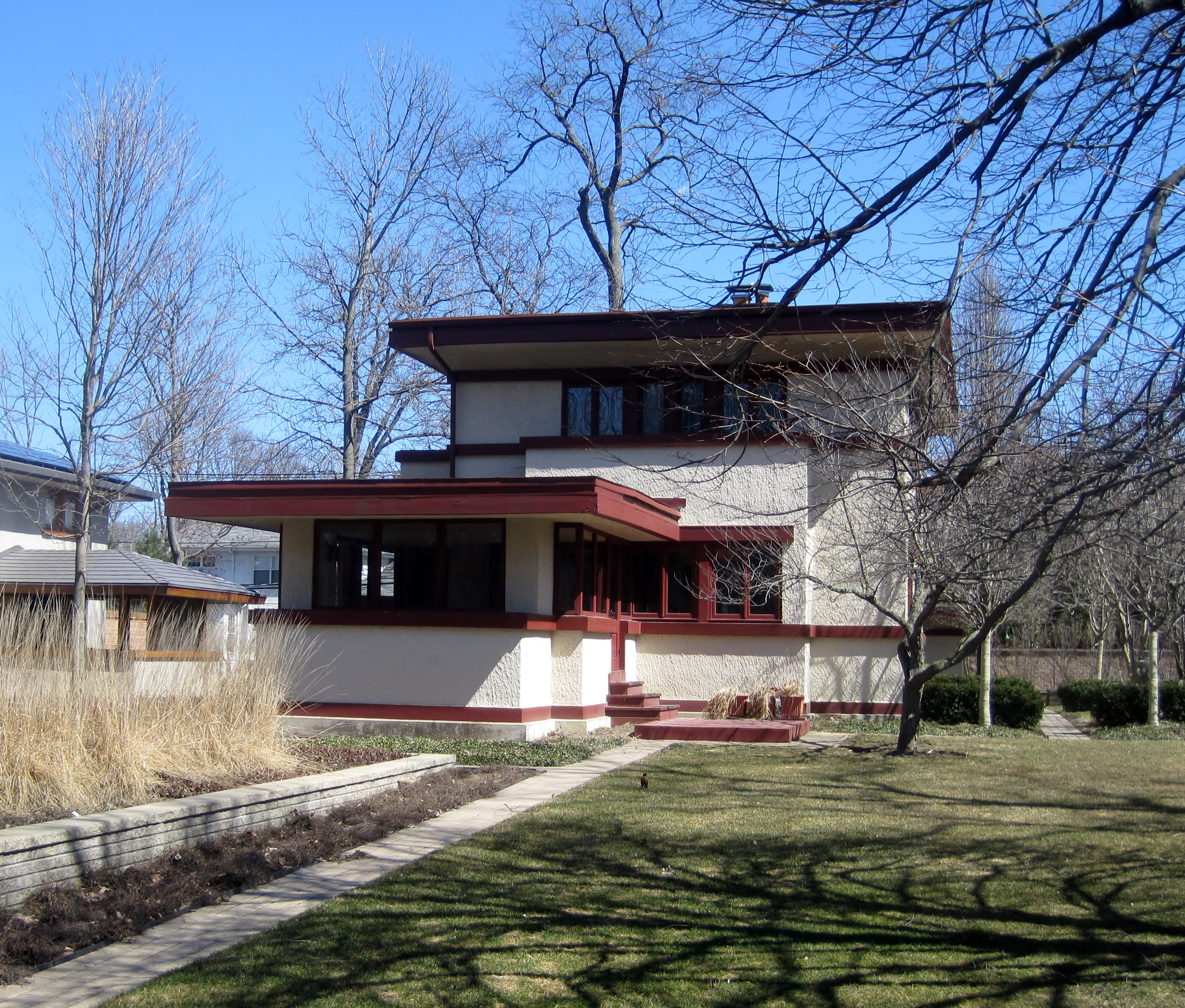
Lute F. and Daniel Kissam House

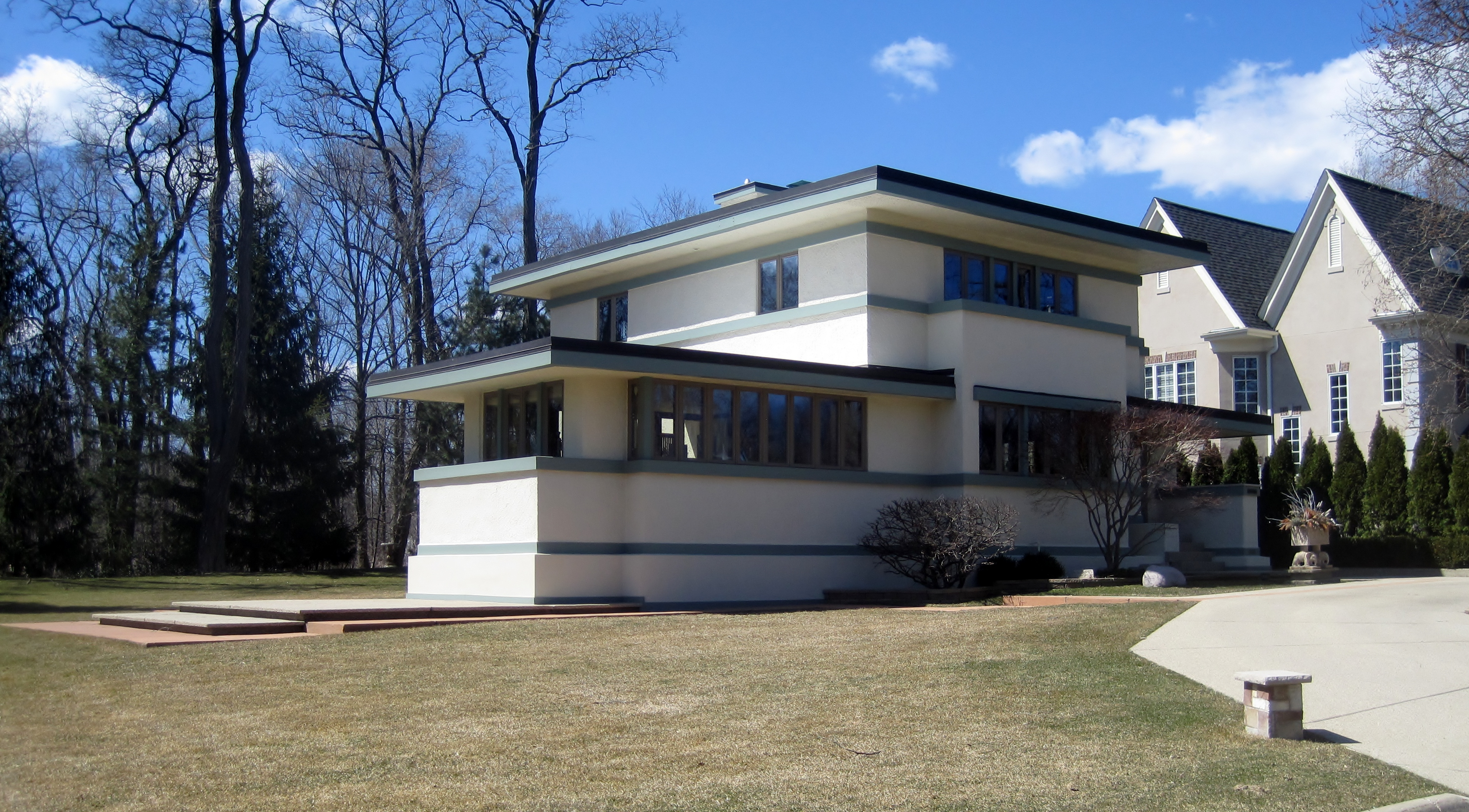
Hollis R. Root House

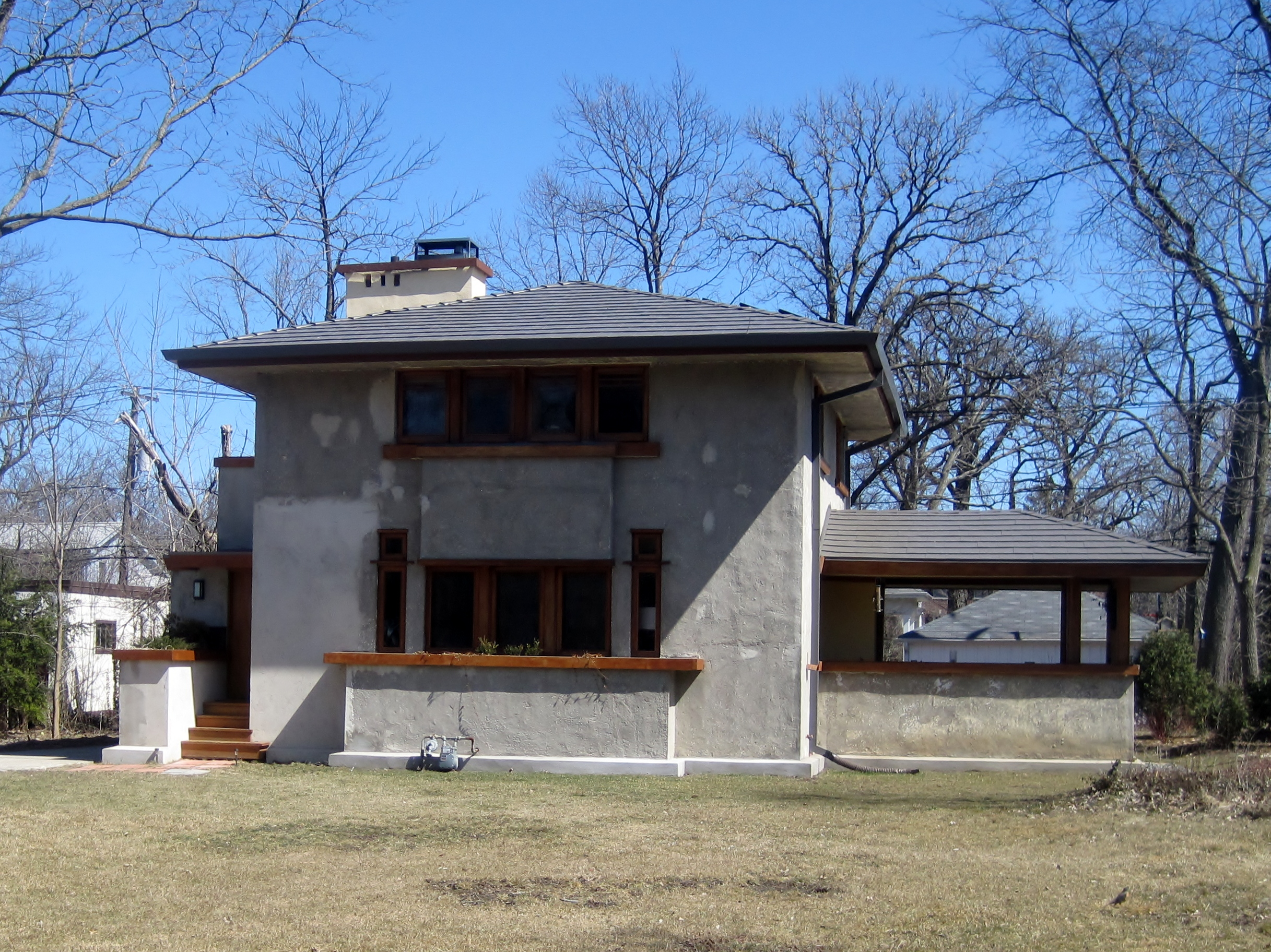
William F. Ross House

== Bridge ==
The Ravine Bluffs Development Bridge, also known as the Sylvan Road Bridge, was a bridge designed by Frank Lloyd Wright and located at the northeastern entrance of the Development. It crosses over the ravine from which the project gets its name. In the 1980s, the bridge was rebuilt. It is one of only 2 bridges designed by Wright to be built; the other bridge leads to the Fallingwater residence in Pennsylvania.

== See also ==
- List of Frank Lloyd Wright works
