= List of Frank Lloyd Wright works =

Frank Lloyd Wright designed 1,141 houses, commercial buildings and other works throughout his lifetime, including 532 that were eventually built. As of 2013, there were 409 extant structures designed by Wright. Over one-third of the extant structures are on the U.S. National Register of Historic Places, either as part of their own designation or as part of a historic district. UNESCO added eight of Wright's designs to the World Heritage List in July 2019 under the title "The 20th-Century Architecture of Frank Lloyd Wright".

== Table key ==
| Demolished or destroyed | Also noted in "Other information" |
| Public sites | Buildings and sites regularly open to the public, available for tours, or available for short-term rental |
| Disputed attributions | Projects lacking general agreement that they are the work of Frank Lloyd Wright |

== Completed work ==
| Name | FLWFA no. | Storrer no. | City | State or country | Designed | Built | Other information | Image |
|---|---|---|---|---|---|---|---|---|
| Unity Chapel | 8601 | S.000 | Spring Green | Wisconsin | 1886 | 1886 | Designed by Joseph Lyman Silsbee. Wright reportedly played a minor role in the interior design. | |
| Hillside Home School I | 8703 | S.001 | Spring Green | Wisconsin | 1887 | 1887 | Designed by Wright while working for Joseph Lyman Silsbee. Demolished 1950 | |
| Frank Lloyd Wright House | 8901 | S.002 | Oak Park | Illinois | 1889 | 1889 | Playroom & kitchen addition 1895. Drafting studio & connecting corridor addition 1898. Remodeled 1911. Restored 1974–1987. Tours available | |
| Louis Sullivan Bungalow | 9003 | S.005 | Ocean Springs | Mississippi | 1890 | 1890 | An Adler & Sullivan commission designed in part by Wright. Destroyed by Hurricane Katrina 2005 | |
| Charnley-Norwood House | 9101 | S.007 | Ocean Springs | Mississippi | 1890 | 1890 | An Adler & Sullivan commission designed in part by Wright. Tours available | |
| James A. Charnley House | 9001 | S.009 | Chicago | Illinois | 1891 | 1892 | An Adler & Sullivan commission designed in part by Wright | |
| Albert Sullivan House | 9207 | S.019 | Chicago | Illinois | 1891 | 1892 | An Adler & Sullivan commission designed in part by Wright, Demolished 1970 | |
| Berry-MacHarg House (Dr. C.H. Berry and W.S. MacHarg House) | 9002 | S.010 | Chicago | Illinois | 1891 | 1892 | An Adler & Sullivan commission designed by Wright; Demolished 1926 | |
| Dr. Allison W. Harlan House | 9204 | S.018 | Chicago | Illinois | 1891 | 1892 | "Bootleg" house designed by Wright while working for Adler & Sullivan. Destroyed by fire 1963 | |
| Warren McArthur House and garage | 9205 | S.011 | Chicago | Illinois | 1892 | 1892 garage and remodelling 1900 | "Bootleg" house designed by Wright while working for Adler & Sullivan | |
| George Blossom House | 9201 | S.014 | Chicago | Illinois | 1892 | 1892 | "Bootleg" house designed by Wright while working for Adler & Sullivan | |
| Robert G. Emmond House | 9202 | S.015 | La Grange | Illinois | 1892 | 1892 | "Bootleg" house designed by Wright while working for Adler & Sullivan | |
| Robert P. Parker House | 9206 | S.017 | Oak Park | Illinois | 1892 | 1892 | "Bootleg" house designed by Wright while working for Adler & Sullivan | |
| Thomas H. Gale House | 9203 | S.016 | Oak Park | Illinois | 1892 | 1892 | "Bootleg" house designed by Wright while working for Adler & Sullivan | |
| W. Irving Clark House | 9209 | S.013 | La Grange | Illinois | 1893 | 1894 | A "bootleg" project designed by Wright while working for Adler & Sullivan but completed after his departure | |
| Lake Mendota Boathouse | 9304 | S.022 | Madison | Wisconsin | 1893 | 1894 | "Bootleg" project designed by Wright while working for Adler & Sullivan but completed after his departure. Demolished 1926 | |
| Walter H. Gale House | 9302 | S.020 | Oak Park | Illinois | 1893 | 1893 | "Bootleg" house designed by Wright while working for Adler & Sullivan | |
| Robert M. Lamp Cottage (Rocky Roost) | 9301 | S.021 | Madison | Wisconsin | 1893 | 1893 | Additions and alterations 1901. Destroyed by fire 1934 | |
| Francis J. Woolley House | 9405 | S.023 | Oak Park | Illinois | 1893 | 1894 | | |
| Frederick Bagley House | 9401 | S.028 | Hinsdale | Illinois | 1894 | 1894 | | |
| Henry and Lily Mitchell House | None | S.039 | Racine | Wisconsin | 1894 | 1894 | Designed by Cecil S. Corwin with input from Wright | |
| William H. Winslow House | 9305 | S.024 | River Forest | Illinois | 1894 | 1894 | | |
| Robert W. Roloson Houses | 9404 | S.026 | Chicago | Illinois | 1894 | 1895 | | |
| Peter Goan House | 9403 | S.029 | La Grange | Illinois | 1894 | 1895 | 108 S. 8th Ave. | |
| Dr. H.W. Bassett House | 9402 | S.027 | Oak Park | Illinois | 1894 | 1894 | Alterations to existing structure, demolished 1922 | |
| Edward C. Waller Apartments | 9504 | S.031 | Chicago | Illinois | 1895 | 1895 | One unit destroyed by fire 1968 | |
| Francisco Terrace Apartments | 9502 | S.030 | Chicago | Illinois | 1895 | 1895 | Demolished 1974. Facade reconstructed and relocated to Oak Park, IL 1977 | |
| Francis Apartments | 9501 | S.032 | Chicago | Illinois | 1895 | 1895 | Demolished 1971 | |
| Chauncey L. Williams House | 9505 | S.033 | River Forest | Illinois | 1895 | 1895 | | |
| Nathan G. Moore House I | 9503 | S.034 | Oak Park | Illinois | 1895 | 1895 | Partially destroyed by fire 1922, redesigned and rebuilt 1923 (see Nathan Moore House II) | |
| Harrison P. Young House | 9507 | S.036 | Oak Park | Illinois | 1895 | 1895 | Alterations to existing structure | |
| George W. Smith House | 9803 | S.045 | Oak Park | Illinois | 1895 | 1898 | | |
| Romeo and Juliet Windmill | 9607 | S.037 | Spring Green | Wisconsin | 1896 | 1897 | Rebuilt 1938, Restored 1992 | |
| Isidore H. Heller House | 9606 | S.038 | Chicago | Illinois | 1896 | 1897 | | |
| Harry C. Goodrich House | 9601 | S.042 | Oak Park | Illinois | 1896 | 1896 | | |
| Charles E. Roberts House | 9603 | S.040 | Oak Park | Illinois | 1896 | 1896 | Alterations to existing structure | |
| Charles E. Roberts Stable | 9602 | S.041 | Oak Park | Illinois | 1896 | 1896 | Alterations to existing structure, converted to living quarters 1903–05, moved to present location 1929 | |
| George W. Furbeck House | 9701 | S.043 | Oak Park | Illinois | 1897 | 1897–98 | | |
| Rollin Furbeck House | 9801 | S.044, S.044A | Oak Park | Illinois | 1897 | 1897 | Remodeled 1907 | |
| Thomas H. Gale Cottage | 9706 | S.088 | Whitehall | Michigan | 1897 | | | |
| River Forest Golf Club | 9802 | S.062 | River Forest | Illinois | 1898 | | Demolished | |
| Frank Lloyd Wright Studio Addition | 9506 | S.004 | Oak Park | Illinois | 1897 | 1898 | Tours available | |
| Joseph and Helen Husser House | 9901 | S.046 | Chicago | Illinois | 1899 | | Demolished 1926 | |
| Edward C. Waller House | 9902 | S.047 | River Forest | Illinois | 1899 | | Alterations to existing structure, demolished 1939 | |
| William and Jessie M. Adams House | 0011 | S.048 | Chicago | Illinois | 1900 | 1900–01 | | |
| S.A. Foster House and Stable | 0003 | S.049 | Chicago | Illinois | 1900 | 1900 | | |
| B. Harley Bradley House (Glenlloyd) | 0002 | S.052 | Kankakee | Illinois | 1900 | | Tours available | |
| Warren Hickox House | 0004 | S.056 | Kankakee | Illinois | 1900 | 1900 | | |
| E.H. Pitkin Cottage | 0005 | S.076 | Sapper Island, Desbarats, Ontario | Canada | 1900 | | | |
| Henry Wallis Cottage | 0114 | S.079 | Delavan | Wisconsin | 1900 | | | |
| Edward C. Waller Gates | 0108 | S.065 | River Forest | Illinois | 1901 | | | |
| Edward C. Waller Poultry House and Stables | 0108 | S.066 | River Forest | Illinois | 1901 | | Poultry house demolished 1939, stables demolished early 1970s | |
| Fred B. Jones House (Penwern) | 0103 | S.083 | Delavan | Wisconsin | 1901 | 1902 | | |
| Ward Winfield Willits House | 0208 | S.054 | Highland Park | Illinois | 1901 | | | |
| F.B. Henderson House | 0104 | S.057 | Elmhurst | Illinois | 1901 | 1901 | | |
| William G. Fricke House | 0201 | S.058 | Oak Park | Illinois | 1901 | | | |
| Buffalo Exposition Pavilion for the Universal Portland Cement Company | 0017 | S.063 | Buffalo | New York | 1901 | 1901 | Temporary structure | |
| Frank W. Thomas House | 0106 | S.067 | Oak Park | Illinois | 1901 | 1901 | | |
| E. Arthur Davenport House | 0101 | S.068 | River Forest | Illinois | 1901 | | | |
| William E. Martin House | 0304 | S.061 | Oak Park | Illinois | 1902 | | | |
| Lake Delavan Yacht Club | 0217 | S.064 | Delavan | Wisconsin | 1902 | | Demolished | |
| Hillside Home School II | 0216 | S.069 | Spring Green | Wisconsin | 1901 | 1902, 1932, 1952 | Tours available | |
| Francis W. Little House I | 0009 | S.070 | Peoria | Illinois | 1902 | 1903 | Robert D. Clarke Stable added 1909 | |
| Robert D. Clarke Stable | 0903 | S.071 | Peoria | Illinois | 1909 | | Stable addition to Francis W. Little House I | |
| Arthur Heurtley House | 0204 | S.074 | Oak Park | Illinois | 1902 | 1902 | | |
| Arthur Heurtley Cottage | 0214 | S.075 | Marquette Island | Michigan | 1902 | 1902 | Alterations to existing structure | |
| Mrs. George Gerts Double House, Bridge Cottage | 0202 | S.077 | Whitehall | Michigan | 1902 | | | |
| Walter Gerts Cottage | 0203 | S.078 | Whitehall | Michigan | 1902 | | | |
| Dana-Thomas House | 9905 | S.072 | Springfield | Illinois | 1902 | 1902–04 | Tours available | |
| Alfred W. Hebert House | 0112 | S.089 | Chicago | Illinois | 1902 | | Alterations to existing structure, Wright-designed elements removed after 1959 fire | |
| George W. Spencer House | 0207 | S.081 | Delavan | Wisconsin | 1902 | | | |
| Charles S. Ross House | 0206 | S.082 | Delavan | Wisconsin | 1902 | | | |
| John A. Mosher House | None | None | Wellington | Ohio | 1902 | 1903–04 | Disputed attribution | |
| George F. Barton House | 0301 | S.103 | Buffalo | New York | 1902 | 1903–04 | Tours available | |
| Joseph J. Walser, Jr. House | 0306 | S.091 | Chicago | Illinois | 1903 | | | |
| Horse Show Fountain (Scoville Park Fountain) | 0305 | S.094 | Oak Park | Illinois | 1903 | 1909 | Rebuilt 1969 | |
| Abraham Lincoln Center | 0010 | S.095 | Chicago | Illinois | 1903 | | Design completed by Dwight H. Perkins | |
| Robert M. Lamp House | 0402 | S.097 | Madison | Wisconsin | 1903 | 1903 | | |
| Darwin D. Martin House | 0405 | S.100 | Buffalo | New York | 1903 | 1904–05 | Tours available | |
| Darwin D. Martin Carriage House, Conservatory, and Pergola | 0405 | S.101 | Buffalo | New York | 1903 | 1903–05 | Demolished 1962. Reconstructed 2004–2007, Tours available | |
| Darwin D. Martin Gardener's Cottage | 0530 | S.090 | Buffalo | New York | 1905 | 1909 | Tours available | |
| Edwin H. Cheney House | 0401 | S.104 | Oak Park | Illinois | 1903 | | | |
| Larkin Administration Building | 0403 | S.093 | Buffalo | New York | 1904 | | Demolished 1950 | |
| Unity Temple | 0611 | S.096 | Oak Park | Illinois | 1905–06 | 1907–08 | Tours available | |
| Burton J. Westcott House | 0712 | S.099 | Springfield | Ohio | 1904 | 1908 | Tours available | |
| William R. Heath House | 0507 | S.105 | Buffalo | New York | 1904 | 1904–05 | | |
| Ferdinand F. Tomek House (The Ship House) | 0711 | S.128 | Riverside | Illinois | 1904 | 1904–06 | | |
| Harvey P. Sutton House | 0710 | S.106 | McCook | Nebraska | 1905 | 1905 | | |
| Hiram Baldwin House | 0502 | S.107 | Kenilworth | Illinois | 1905 | 1905 | | |
| Mary W. Adams House | 0501 | S.108 | Highland Park | Illinois | 1905 | 1905 | | |
| William A. Glasner House | 0505 | S.109 | Glencoe | Illinois | 1905 | 1906 | | |
| Charles A. Brown House | 0503 | S.110 | Evanston | Illinois | 1905 | | | |
| Frank L. Smith Bank | 0512 | S.111 | Dwight | Illinois | 1905 | 1905 | Open to the public | |
| E.A. Cummings Real Estate Office | 0702 | S.112 | River Forest | Illinois | 1905 | | Demolished 1925 | |
| Martin & Martin Building (E-Z Polish Factory) | 0504 | S.114 | Chicago | Illinois | 1905 | 1905 | | |
| Lawrence Memorial Library | 0509 | S.073 | Springfield | Illinois | 1905 | | | |
| A.P. Johnson House | 0508 | S.087 | Delavan | Wisconsin | 1905 | 1905 | | |
| Thomas P. Hardy House | 0506 | S.115 | Racine | Wisconsin | 1905 | 1905 | | |
| Mrs Thomas H. Gale Cottages I, II, and III | 0521, 0522, 0523 | S.088.0, S.088.1, S.088.2 | Whitehall | Michigan | 1905 | 1909 | | |
| Rookery Building Lobby | 0511 | S.113 | Chicago | Illinois | 1905 | 1907 | Lobby remodeling, open to the public, tours available | |
| William H. Pettit Memorial Chapel | 0619 | S.116 | Belvidere | Illinois | 1906 | 1907 | Tours available | |
| Peter A. Beachy House | 0601 | S.117 | Oak Park | Illinois | 1906 | 1906 | | |
| Frederic Nicholas House | 0607 | S.118 | Flossmoor | Illinois | 1906 | | | |
| River Forest Tennis Club | 0608 | S.119 | River Forest | Illinois | 1906 | | Moved Moved to present location 1920 | |
| Hills-DeCaro House | 0102 | S.051 | Oak Park | Illinois | 1906 | 1906 | Alterations to existing structure, reconstructed after fire 1977 | |
| P.D. Hoyt House | 0605 | S.120 | Geneva | Illinois | 1906 | | | |
| Mrs. A.W. Gridley House (Ravine House) | 0604 | S.121 | Batavia | Illinois | 1906 | 1906 | | |
| Grace Fuller House | 0603 | S.123 | Glencoe | Illinois | 1906 | | Uncertain if ever built | |
| K.C. DeRhodes House | 0602 | S.125 | South Bend | Indiana | 1906 | 1906 | | |
| George Madison Millard House | 0606 | S.126 | Highland Park | Illinois | 1906 | 1906 | | |
| Andrew T. Porter House (Tan-Y-Deri) | 0709 | S.134 | Spring Green | Wisconsin | 1907 | 1907–08 | | |
| Avery Coonley House | 0803 | S.135 | Riverside | Illinois | 1907 | Complex completed 1912 | | |
| Stephen M.B. Hunt House I | 0705 | S.138 | La Grange | Illinois | 1907 | 1907 | | |
| Col. George Fabyan Villa | 0703 | S.129 | Geneva | Illinois | 1907 | 1907 | Alterations to existing structure, tours available | |
| Fox River Country Club | 0704 | S.130 | Geneva | Illinois | 1907 | | Alterations and addition to existing structure, destroyed by fire 1910 | |
| Larkin Company Exhibition Pavilion | 0706 | S.132 | Norfolk | Virginia | 1907 | 1907 | Temporary structure | |
| George Blossom Garage | 0701 | S.133 | Chicago | Illinois | 1907 | 1907 | | |
| Pebbles & Balch Shop | 0708 | S.131 | Oak Park | Illinois | 1907 | 1907 | Alterations to existing structure, demolished by 1942 | |
| Frederick C. Robie House | 0908 | S.127 | Chicago | Illinois | 1908 | 1909–10 | Completed restoration 2019, tours available | |
| G.C. Stockman House | 0809 | S.139 | Mason City | Iowa | 1908 | 1908 | Tours available | |
| Raymond W. Evans House | 0805 | S.140 | Chicago | Illinois | 1908 | | | |
| Browne's Bookstore | 0802 | S.141 | Chicago | Illinois | 1908 | | Interior design, demolished 1912 | |
| L.K. Horner House | 0807 | S.142 | Chicago | Illinois | 1908 | | Demolished 1952 | |
| Eugene A. Gilmore House (Airplane House) | 0806 | S.146 | Madison | Wisconsin | 1908 | 1908 | | |
| Edward E. Boynton House | 0801 | S.147 | Rochester | New York | 1908 | 1908 | | |
| Walter V. Davidson House | 0804 | S.149 | Buffalo | New York | 1908 | 1908 | | |
| Isabel Roberts House | 0808 | S.150 | River Forest | Illinois | 1908 | 1908 | Refaced with brick 1926, interior alterations by Wright 1955 | |
| Warren Scott Alterations to Isabel Roberts House | 5608 | S.394 | River Forest | Illinois | 1908 | 1908 | Interior alterations | |
| Meyer May House | 0817 | S.148 | Grand Rapids | Michigan | 1908 | 1908–09 | Restored 1986–1987, tours available | |
| William H. Copeland House | 0904 | S.158, S.159 | Oak Park | Illinois | 1908–09 | 1908–09 | Alterations to existing structure | |
| City National Bank Building and Park Inn Hotel | 0902 | S.155 | Mason City | Iowa | 1908–09 | 1909–10 | Tours available | |
| Edmund D. Brigham House | 1503 | S.184 | Glencoe | Illinois | 1908–09 | 1909 | | |
| Mrs. Thomas H. Gale House | 0905 | S.098 | Oak Park | Illinois | 1909 | 1909 | | |
| Bitter Root Inn | 0918 | S.145 | Stevensville | Montana | 1909 | | Destroyed by fire 1924 | |
| Como Orchard Summer Colony | 1002 | S.144 | Darby | Montana | 1909 | | | |
| Frank J. Baker House | 0901 | S.151 | Wilmette | Illinois | 1909 | 1909 | | |
| Oscar M. Steffens House | 0909 | S.153 | Chicago | Illinois | 1909 | | Demolished 1963 | |
| W. Scott Thurber Art Gallery | 0911 | S.154 | Chicago | Illinois | 1909 | | Interior design, Demolished by 1917 | |
| George C. Stewart House (Butterfly Woods) | 0907 | S.160 | Montecito | California | 1909 | | | |
| J. Kibben Ingalls House | 0906 | S.161 | River Forest | Illinois | 1909 | | | |
| Peter C. Stohr Arcade Building | 0910 | S.162 | Chicago | Illinois | 1909 | | Demolished 1922 | |
| Edward P. Irving House | 1003 | S.165 | Decatur | Illinois | 1909 | | Final design completed by Marion Mahony Griffin | |
| Edward C. Waller Bathing Pavilion | 0916 | S.166 | Charlevoix | Michigan | 1909 | | Destroyed by fire c. 1922 | |
| Rev. Jessie R. Zeigler House | 1007 | S.164 | Frankfort | Kentucky | 1909 | 1910 | | |
| Universal Portland Cement Company New York City Exhibition | 1004 | S.163 | New York | New York | 1910 | 1910 | Temporary structure | |
| Ingwald Moe House | 0531 | None | Gary | Indiana | 1910 | | | |
| Walter Gerts House | None | S.177 | River Forest | Illinois | 1911 | 1911 | Alterations to existing structure | Walter Gerts House |
| Oscar B. Balch House | 1102 | S.168 | Oak Park | Illinois | 1911 | 1911 | | |
| Herbert Angster House | 1101 | S.169 | Lake Bluff | Illinois | 1911 | | Demolished 1956 | |
| Chicago & Milwaukee Electric Railway Station | 1124 | | Glencoe | Illinois | 1911 | | Demolished mid-1950s | |
| Sherman M. Booth Cottage | 1119 | S.178 | Glencoe | Illinois | 1911 | | Relocated to Ravine Bluffs Park 2020 | |
| Banff National Park Pavilion | 1302 | S.170 | Banff, Alberta | Canada | 1911 | 1913–14 | Demolished 1939 | |
| Lake Geneva Hotel | 1202 | S.171 | Lake Geneva | Wisconsin | 1911 | | Demolished 1970 | |
| Taliesin I | 1104 | S.172 | Spring Green | Wisconsin | 1911 | 1911 | Partially destroyed by fire 1914 | |
| The Avery Coonley Playhouse | 1201 | S.174 | Riverside | Illinois | 1911 | 1912 | | |
| Francis W. Little House II | 1304 | S.173 | Deephaven | Minnesota | 1912 | 1912–14 | Demolished 1972. Living room displayed at The Met, NYC. Library displayed at The Allentown Art Museum, PA, Hallway displayed at The Minneapolis Institute of Arts, MN | |
| Observation Platform for Island Woolen Mills | None | S.143 | Baraboo | Wisconsin | 1912 | | Disputed attribution, Demolished in the early 1970s | |
| William B. Greene House | 1203 | S.176 | Aurora | Illinois | 1912 | | Later addition by Harry F. Robinson | |
| Park Ridge Country Club | 1204 | S.175 | Park Ridge | Illinois | 1912 | 1912 | Alterations and additions to existing structure, demolished 1930 | |
| Harry S. Adams House | 1105 | S.179 | Oak Park | Illinois | 1913 | | | |
| N.N. Souther House | None | S.179.11a | River Forest | Illinois | 1913 | | Disputed attribution | |
| M.F. Russell House | None | S.179.12a | River Forest | Illinois | 1913 | | Disputed attribution | |
| Samuel Wilson House | None | S.179.13a | River Forest | Illinois | 1913 | | Disputed attribution | |
| McClintock House | None | S.179.14a | River Forest | Illinois | 1913 | | Disputed attribution | |
| R.N. Fellows House | None | S.179.21a | River Forest | Illinois | 1913 | | Disputed attribution | |
| A.E. Olson House | None | S.179.22a | River Forest | Illinois | 1913 | | Disputed attribution | |
| F.R. Donahue House | None | S.179.23a | River Forest | Illinois | 1913 | | Disputed attribution | |
| F.W. Collins House | None | S.179.31a | River Forest | Illinois | 1913 | | Disputed attribution | |
| Dr. I.A. Toren House | None | S.179.32a | River Forest | Illinois | 1913 | | Disputed attribution | |
| W.C. Gaddis House | None | S.179.41a | River Forest | Illinois | 1913 | | Disputed attribution | |
| E.G. Wheeler House | None | S.179.42a | River Forest | Illinois | 1913 | | Disputed attribution | |
| L.E. Murphy House | None | S.179.51a | River Forest | Illinois | 1913 | | Disputed attribution | |
| S.R. Flett House | None | S.179.52a | River Forest | Illinois | 1913 | | Disputed attribution | |
| S.D. Roberts House | None | S.179.61a | River Forest | Illinois | 1913 | | Disputed attribution | |
| C.J. LaMena House | None | S.179.62a | River Forest | Illinois | 1913 | | Disputed attribution | |
| C.G. Towers House | None | S.179.63a | River Forest | Illinois | 1913 | | Disputed attribution | |
| Frank Winters House | None | S.179.71a | River Forest | Illinois | 1913 | | Disputed attribution | |
| J.J. Willis House | None | S.179.72a | River Forest | Illinois | 1913 | | Disputed attribution | |
| D.H. Davis House | None | S.179.73a | River Forest | Illinois | 1913 | | Disputed attribution | |
| Roy Iverson House | None | S.179.81a | River Forest | Illinois | 1913 | | Disputed attribution | |
| W.H. Gordon House | None | S.179.82a | River Forest | Illinois | 1913 | | Disputed attribution | |
| P.W. Hazelton House | None | S.179.91a | River Forest | Illinois | 1913 | | Disputed attribution | |
| W.C. Rohray House | None | S.179.92a | River Forest | Illinois | 1913 | | Disputed attribution | |
| F.J. Hinckley House | None | S.179.93a | River Forest | Illinois | 1913 | | Disputed attribution | |
| C.J. Burras House | None | S.179.XOa | River Forest | Illinois | 1913 | | Disputed attribution | |
| Clark H. Sherman Residence | None | S.179.24a | River Forest | Illinois | 1913 | | Disputed attribution | |
| Harry Hogan Model House | None | S.179.43a | River Forest | Illinois | 1913 | | Disputed attribution | |
| Midway Gardens | 1401 | S.180 | Chicago | Illinois | 1913 | 1914 | Demolished 1929 | |
| Taliesin II | 1403 | S.182 | Spring Green | Wisconsin | 1914 | | Partially destroyed by fire 1925 | |
| Mori Oriental Art Studio | 1402 | S.181 | Chicago | Illinois | 1914 | | | |
| Women's Building at Inter-County Fairgrounds | None | S.167 | Spring Green | Wisconsin | 1914 | | Demolished 1924 | |
| Sherman M. Booth House | 1502 | S.187 | Glencoe | Illinois | 1915 | | | |
| Ravine Bluffs Development Sculptures | 1505 | S.185.1, S.185.2, S.185.3 | Glencoe | Illinois | 1915 | | Disputed attributionRavine Bluffs Development | |
| Ravine Bluffs Sylvan Road Bridge | 1505 | S.186 | Glencoe | Illinois | 1915 | | Ravine Bluffs Development | |
| Charles R. Perry House | 1516 | S.188 | Glencoe | Illinois | 1915 | | Disputed attributionRavine Bluffs Development | |
| Hollis R. Root House | 1516 | S.189 | Glencoe | Illinois | 1915 | | Ravine Bluffs Development | |
| William F. Kier House | 1516 | S.190 | Glencoe | Illinois | 1915 | | Ravine Bluffs Development | |
| William F. Ross House | 1516 | S.191 | Glencoe | Illinois | 1915 | | Ravine Bluffs Development | |
| Lute F. and Daniel Kissam House | 1516 | S.192 | Glencoe | Illinois | 1915 | | Ravine Bluffs Development | |
| Arthur R. Munkwitz Duplex Apartments | 1605 | S.200 | Shorewood (Milwaukee County) | Wisconsin | 1915 | 1916 | Two structures with four apartments each, demolished 1973 | |
| American System-Built Homes | 1506 | S.201, S.202, S.203, S.204 | Various Locations | | 1914–15 | | Prototype designs for standardized production | |
| Arthur L. Richards Duplex Apartments | 1506 | S.201 | Milwaukee | Wisconsin | 1915 | 1916 | American System-Built Homes, four structures, one unit. Occasional tours available | |
| Arthur L. Richards Small House | 1506 | S.202 | Milwaukee | Wisconsin | 1915 | 1916 | American System-Built Homes. Tours available | |
| Arthur L. Richards Bungalow | 1506 | S.203.1 | Milwaukee | Wisconsin | 1915 | | American System-Built Homes | |
| Lewis E. Burleigh House | 1506 | S.203.2 | Wilmette | Illinois | 1915 | | American System-Built Homes | |
| Ida and Grace McElwain House | 1506 | S.203.3 | Lake Bluff | Illinois | 1915 | | American System-Built Homes | |
| Stephen M. B. Hunt House II | 1704 | S.203.4 | Oshkosh | Wisconsin | 1915 | 1917 | American System-Built Homes | |
| Elizabeth Murphy House | 1506 | S.203.5 | Shorewood | Wisconsin | 1915 | 1917 | American System-Built Homes | |
| Guy C. Smith House | 1506 | S.204.1 | Chicago | Illinois | 1915 | 1917 | American System-Built Homes | |
| H. Howard Hyde House | 1506 | S.204.2 | Chicago | Illinois | 1915 | 1917 | American System-Built Homes | |
| Oscar A. Johnson House | 1506 | S.204.3 | Evanston | Illinois | 1915 | 1917 | American System-Built Homes | |
| Delbert W. Meier House | 1506 | S.204.4 | Monona | Iowa | 1915 | 1917 | American System-Built Homes | Delbert & Grace Meier House |
| Wilbur Wynant House | 1506 | S.204.5 | Gary | Indiana | 1915 | 1916 | American System-Built Homes, destroyed by fire 2006 | |
| Charles Heisen House | 1506 | S.204.6 | Villa Park | Illinois | 1915 | 1917 | American System-Built Homes | |
| Thomas E. Sullivan House | 1506 | S.204.7 | Wilmette | Illinois | 1915 | 1916 | American System-Built Homes, addition by John S. Van Bergen | |
| A.D. German Warehouse | 1504 | S.183 | Richland Center | Wisconsin | 1915 | 1921 | Tours available | |
| Emil Bach House | 1501 | S.193 | Chicago | Illinois | 1915 | 1915 | | |
| Imperial Hotel | 1509 | S.194 | Tokyo | Japan | 1916 | Completed 1923 | Demolished 1968, partially reconstructed at Meiji Mura Park | |
| Frederick C. Bogk House | 1502 | S.196 | Milwaukee | Wisconsin | 1916 | | | |
| Ernest Vosburgh House | 1607 | S.197 | Grand Beach | Michigan | 1916 | | | |
| Joseph J. Bagley House | 1601 | S.198 | Grand Beach | Michigan | 1916 | | | |
| William S. Carr House | 1603 | S.199 | Grand Beach | Michigan | 1916 | | Demolished 2004 | |
| Henry J. Allen House (Allen-Lambe House) | 1701 | S.205 | Wichita | Kansas | 1917 | | Tours available | |
| Aisaku Hayashi House | 1702 | S.206 | Tokyo | Japan | 1917 | | | |
| Aline Barnsdall House (Hollyhock House) | 1705 | S.208 | Los Angeles | California | 1917 | 1919–21 | Tours available | |
| J. W. Groves House | None | None | Madison | Wisconsin | 1917 | | American System-Built Homes | |
| Arinobu Fukuhara House | 1801 | S.207 | Kanagawa-Ken | Japan | 1918 | | Destroyed by the Great Kantō earthquake 1923 | |
| Tazaemon Yamamura House | 1803 | S.212 | Hyogo-Ken | Japan | 1918 | 1924 | Tours available | |
| Imperial Hotel Annex | 1604 | S.195 | Tokyo | Japan | 1919 | | Temporary structure, demolished 1923 | |
| Midway Barn | 4404 | S.246 | Spring Green | Wisconsin | 1920 | Expanded 1947 | Tours available | |
| Jiyu Gakuen Girls School | 2101 | S.213 | Tokyo | Japan | 1921 | 1921 | Tours available | |
| Nathan G. Moore House II | 2303 | S.034A | Oak Park | Illinois | 1923 | 1923 | Reconstruction of Nathan Moore House I | |
| Alice Millard House (La Miniatura) | 2302 | S.214 | Pasadena | California | 1923 | 1923 | | |
| Dr. John Storer House | 2304 | S.215 | Hollywood | California | 1923 | 1923 | | |
| Samuel Freeman House | 2402 | S.216 | Los Angeles | California | 1923 | 1923 | | |
| Charles Ennis House | 2401 | S.217 | Los Feliz | California | 1923 | 1924 | Occasional Tours available | |
| Taliesin III | 2501 | S.218 | Spring Green | Wisconsin | 1925 | | Tours available | |
| Isabelle R. Martin House (Graycliff) | 2701 | S.225 | Derby | New York | 1926 | 1926–29 | Tours available | |
| Arizona Biltmore Hotel | 2710 | S.221 | Phoenix | Arizona | 1927 | 1929 | Warren Chase MacArthur, architect; F.L. Wright, consulting architect | |
| Beach Cottages at Dumyat (Ras-el-Bar) | None | S.223 | Dumyat | Egypt | 1927 | | Likely never built | |
| Ocotillo Desert Camp | 2702 | S.224 | Chandler | Arizona | 1929 | | Partially destroyed by fire and abandoned summer of 1929 | |
| Chandler Land Improvement Company Camp Cabins | 2804 | | Chandler | Arizona | 1929 | | Demolished by 1934 | |
| Richard Lloyd Jones House | 2902 | S.227 | Tulsa | Oklahoma | 1929 | 1929 | | |
| Malcolm E. Willey House | 3401 | S.229 | Minneapolis | Minnesota | 1934 | 1934 | | |
| Edgar J. Kaufmann Sr. House (Fallingwater) | 3602 | S.230 | Bear Run | Pennsylvania | 1935 | 1936–38 | Tours available | |
| Herbert Jacobs House I | 3702 | S.234 | Madison | Wisconsin | 1936 | 1937 | | |
| Abby Beecher Roberts House (Deertrack) | 3603 | S.236 | Marquette | Michigan | 1936 | | | |
| Johnson Wax Headquarters | 3601 | S.237 | Racine | Wisconsin | 1936 | 1936–39 | Tours available | |
| Johnson Research Tower | 4401 | S.238 | Racine | Wisconsin | 1944 | 1944–50 | Tours available | |
| Paul R. Hanna House (Honeycomb House) | 3701 | S.235 | Palo Alto | California | 1937 | 1937 | Owned by Stanford University, open twice a year for tours | |
| Herbert F. Johnson House (Wingspread) | 3703 | S.239 | Wind Point | Wisconsin | 1937 | 1938–39 | Tours available | |
| Ben Rebhuhn House | 3801 | S.240 | Great Neck Estates | New York | 1937 | 1937 | | |
| Taliesin West | 3803 | S.241 | Scottsdale | Arizona | 1937 | 1937 | Tours available | |
| Edgar J. Kaufmann Sr. Office | 3704 | S.233 | Pittsburgh | Pennsylvania | 1937 | | Reconstructed at the V&A East Storehouse, London | |
| Suntop Homes | 3906 | S.248 | Ardmore | Pennsylvania | 1938 | 1939 | | |
| Charles L. Manson House | 4009 | S.249 | Wausau | Wisconsin | 1938 | 1938–41 | | |
| Florida Southern College Master Plan | 3805 | S.251, S.252, S.253, S.254, S.255, S.256, S.257, S.258 | Lakeland | Florida | 1938–54 | | | |
| FSC Esplanades | 3814 | S.257 | Lakeland | Florida | 1946 | 1946–58 | Florida Southern College | |
| FSC Annie M. Pfeiffer Chapel | 3816 | S.251 | Lakeland | Florida | 1938 | 1941 | Florida Southern College | |
| FSC Seminar Buildings I, II, & III | 4031 | S.253.1, S.253.2, S.253.3, S.253A | Lakeland | Florida | 1940 | 1949 | Florida Southern College | |
| FSC E. T. Roux Library | 4118 | S.252 | Lakeland | Florida | 1941 | 1946 | Florida Southern College | |
| FSC Administration Building | 4515 | S.255 | Lakeland | Florida | 1945 | 1949 | Florida Southern College | |
| FSC J. Edgar Wall Water Dome | 4515 | S.255A | Lakeland | Florida | 1948 | 1949 | Florida Southern College | |
| FSC Industrial Arts Building | 4212 | S.254 | Lakeland | Florida | 1942 | 1952 | Florida Southern College | |
| FSC William H. Danforth Chapel | 5318 | S.258 | Lakeland | Florida | 1954 | 1955 | Florida Southern College | |
| FSC Polk County Science Building | 5319 | S.256 | Lakeland | Florida | 1953 | 1958 | Florida Southern College | |
| John C. Pew House | 4012 | S.273 | Shorewood Hills | Wisconsin | 1939 | | | |
| Sidney Bazett House | 4002 | S.259 | Hillsborough | California | 1939 | | | |
| Andrew F. H. Armstrong House | 3901 | S.260 | Ogden Dunes | Indiana | 1939 | | | |
| Stanley Rosenbaum House and Addition | 3903, 4815 | S.267, S.267A | Florence | Alabama | 1939, 1948 | 1940, 1948 | Enlarged 1948, tours available | |
| Lloyd Lewis House | 4008 | S.265 | Libertyville | Illinois | 1939 | 1939 | | |
| Loren B. Pope House (Pope-Leighey House) | 4013 | S.268 | Falls Church | Virginia | 1939 | 1940 | Relocated to Alexandria, VA 2001, tours available | |
| Goetsch-Winckler House | 3907 | S.269 | Okemos | Michigan | 1939 | 1940 | | |
| Joseph Euchtman House | 4005 | S.270 | Pikesville | Maryland | 1939 | | | |
| Bernard Schwartz House (Still Bend) | 3904 | S.271 | Two Rivers | Wisconsin | 1939 | 1940 | Available for short-term rental | |
| George D. Sturges House | 3905 | S.272 | Brentwood Heights | California | 1939 | 1939 | | |
| Clarence Sondern House | 4014 | S.279 | Kansas City | Missouri | 1939 | 1940 | | |
| Rose Pauson House | 4011 | S.250 | Phoenix | Arizona | 1939 | 1940 | Destroyed by fire 1942 | |
| C. Leigh Stevens House (Auldbrass Plantation) | 4015 | S.261, S.262, S.263, S.264 | Yemassee | South Carolina | 1940 | 1940–51 | | |
| Gregor S. Affleck House | 4111 | S.274 | Bloomfield Hills | Michigan | 1940 | 1940 | Owned by Lawrence Technological University | |
| Arch Oboler House Complex | 4112 | S.275 | Malibu | California | 1940 | Completed 1955 | Destroyed by fire 2018 | |
| Theodore Baird Residence | 4001 | S.277 | Amherst | Massachusetts | 1940 | 1940 | | |
| James B. Christie House | 4003 | S.278 | Bernardsville | New Jersey | 1940 | 1940 | | |
| Community Christian Church | 4004 | S.280 | Kansas City | Missouri | 1940 | 1940–42 | | |
| Stuart Richardson House | 4104 | S.282 | Glen Ridge | New Jersey | 1941 | 1951 | | |
| Carlton D. Wall House (Snowflake) | 4114 | S.281 | Plymouth | Michigan | 1941 | 1941–47 | | |
| Solomon R. Guggenheim Museum | 4305 | S.400 | New York | New York | 1943–56 | Completed 1959 | | |
| Herbert Jacobs House II | 4812 | S.283 | Middleton | Wisconsin | 1944 | 1946–48 | | |
| Lowell Walter Residence (Cedar Rock) | 4505 | S.284 | Quasqueton | Iowa | 1945 | | Tours available | |
| Arnold Friedman Lodge (Fir Tree) | 4512 | S.286 | Pecos | New Mexico | 1945 | | | |
| Melvyn Maxwell Smith House | 4818 | S.287 | Bloomfield Hills | Michigan | 1946 | 1949 | Owned by Cranbrook School, tours available | |
| Douglas Grant House | 4503 | S.288 | Marion | Iowa | 1946 | 1946 | | |
| Alvin L. Miller House | 5016 | S.289 | Charles City | Iowa | 1946 | 1946 | | |
| Chauncey L. Griggs Residence | 4604 | S.290 | Tacoma | Washington | 1946 | | | |
| Amy Alpaugh Studio Residence | 4703 | S.293 | Northport | Michigan | 1946 | | | |
| Unitarian Meeting House | 5031 | S.291 | Shorewood Hills | Wisconsin | 1947 | 1949–51 | Tours available | |
| A.H. Bulbulian Residence | 4709 | S.292 | Rochester | Minnesota | 1947 | 1947 | | |
| Galesburg Country Homes (The Acres) | 4828 | S.294, S.295, S.296, S.297 | Galesburg | Michigan | 1948 | 1949 | Master plan for cooperative community | |
| David and Christine Weisblat House | 4918 | S.294 | Galesburg | Michigan | 1948 | 1949 | Galesburg Country Homes (The Acres) | |
| Eric and Pat Pratt House | 4827 | S.295 | Galesburg | Michigan | 1948 | 1949 | Galesburg Country Homes (The Acres) | |
| Samuel and Dorothy Eppstein House | 4905 | S.296 | Galesburg | Michigan | 1948 | 1949 | Galesburg Country Homes (The Acres), available for short-term rental | |
| Curtis and Lillian Meyer House | 5015 | S.297 | Galesburg | Michigan | 1948 | 1949 | Galesburg Country Homes (The Acres) | |
| Herman T. Mossberg Residence | 4914 | S.302 | South Bend | Indiana | 1948 | 1948 | | |
| J. Willis Hughes House (Fountainhead) | 4908 | S.303 | Jackson | Mississippi | 1948 | 1950 | | |
| Carroll Alsop House | 4804 | S.304 | Oskaloosa | Iowa | 1948 | 1948 | | |
| Mrs. Clinton Walker House | 5122 | S.306 | Carmel | California | 1948 | 1951 | | |
| Albert Adelman House | 4834 | S.308 | Fox Point | Wisconsin | 1948 | 1948 | | |
| Maynard P. Buehler House | 4805 | S.309 | Orinda | California | 1948 | 1948 | | |
| Charles E. Weltzheimer House | 4819 | S.311 | Oberlin | Ohio | 1948 | 1948–49 | Tours available | |
| Erling P. Brauner House | 4601 | S.312 | Okemos | Michigan | 1948 | | | |
| V. C. Morris Gift Shop | 4824 | S.310 | San Francisco | California | 1948 | 1948–49 | | |
| Parkwyn Village | 4806 | S.298, S.299, S.300, S.301 | Kalamazoo | Michigan | 1948 | 1949–50 | Master plan for cooperative community | |
| Robert and Rae Levin House | 4911 | S.298 | Kalamazoo | Michigan | 1948 | 1949 | Parkwyn Village | |
| Ward and Helen McCartney House | 4912 | S.299, S.299B | Kalamazoo | Michigan | 1948 | 1949 | Parkwyn Village | |
| Eric and Ann Brown House | 5003 | S.300 | Kalamazoo | Michigan | 1948 | 1949 | Parkwyn Village | |
| Robert D. Winn House | 4813 | S.301 | Kalamazoo | Michigan | 1948 | 1950 | Parkwyn Village | |
| Usonia II (Usonia Homes) | 4720 | S.316, S.317, S.318 | Pleasantville | New York | 1947 | 1948–51 | Master plan for cooperative community | |
| Sol Friedman House (Toyhill) | 4906 | S.316 | Pleasantville | New York | 1948 | 1948 | Usonia II (Usonia Homes) | |
| Edward Serlin House | 4917 | S.317 | Pleasantville | New York | 1948 | 1949 | Usonia II (Usonia Homes) | |
| Roland Reisley House | 5115 | S.318 | Pleasantville | New York | 1948 | 1951 | Usonia II (Usonia Homes) | |
| James Edwards House | 4904 | S.313 | Okemos | Michigan | 1949 | | | |
| Howard E. Anthony House | 4901 | S.315 | Benton Harbor | Michigan | 1949 | | | |
| Kenneth Laurent House | 4814 | S.319 | Rockford | Illinois | 1949 | 1952 | Tours available | |
| Henry J. Neils House | 5020 | S.314 | Minneapolis | Minnesota | 1949 | 1951 | | |
| Wilbur C. Pearce Residence | 5114 | S.320 | Bradbury | California | 1950 | | | |
| Thomas E. Keys Residence | 5012 | S.321 | Rochester | Minnesota | 1950 | 1950 | | |
| David and Gladys Wright House | 5030 | S.322 | Phoenix | Arizona | 1950 | 1953 | | |
| Russell W. Kraus House | 5123 | S.340 | Kirkwood | Missouri | 1950 | 1952–60 | Tours available | |
| John Haynes House | 5110 | S.323 | Fort Wayne | Indiana | 1950 | 1952 | | |
| Dr. Richard Davis House (Woodside) | 5037 | S.324 | Marion | Indiana | 1950 | 1955 | | |
| J.A. Sweeton House | 5027 | S.325 | Cherry Hill | New Jersey | 1950 | 1950 | | |
| John O. Carr House | 5014 | S.327 | Glenview | Illinois | 1950 | | | |
| Donald Schaberg House | 5022 | S.328 | Okemos | Michigan | 1950 | 1957–58 | | |
| Dr. R. Bradford Harper House | 5010 | S.329 | St. Joseph | Michigan | 1950 | | | |
| Robert Berger Residence | 5039 | S.330 | San Anselmo | California | 1950 | | | |
| Eddie's House (Robert Berger Doghouse) | None | S.330A | San Anselmo | California | 1957 | 1963 | Doghouse for Robert Berger Residence Destroyed 1973 | |
| Arthur C. Mathews Residence | 5013 | S.331 | Atherton | California | 1950 | | | |
| Dr. Isadore J. Zimmerman House | 5214 | S.333 | Manchester | New Hampshire | 1950 | | Owned by the Currier Museum of Art, tours available | |
| Robert Muirhead House | 5019 | S.334 | Hampshire | Illinois | 1950 | | Tours available | |
| Karl A. Staley House | 5119 | S.335 | North Madison | Ohio | 1950 | 1951 | | |
| S.P. Elam Residence | 5105 | S.336 | Austin | Minnesota | 1950 | | Available for short-term rental | |
| Richard C. Smith House | 5026 | S.337 | Jefferson | Wisconsin | 1950 | 1950 | | |
| John A. Gillin Residence | 5034 | S.338 | Dallas | Texas | 1950 | 1958 | | |
| Raymond Carlson Residence | 5004 | S.326 | Phoenix | Arizona | 1950 | | | |
| Seamour Shavin House | 5023 | S.339 | Chattanooga | Tennessee | 1950 | 1952 | | |
| Wetmore Auto Service Station | None | None | Ferndale | Michigan | 1951 | 1951 | Unfinished interior alterations previously assigned Storrer number S.348 but no longer listed | |
| Patrick and Margaret Kinney House | 5038 | S.342 | Lancaster | Wisconsin | 1951 | 1951–53 | Addition by John H. Howe 1964 | |
| Charles F. Glore Residence | 5107 | S.341 | Lake Forest | Illinois | 1951 | | | |
| Nathan Rubin Residence | 5116 | S.343 | Canton | Ohio | 1951 | | | |
| Benjamin Adelman Residence | 5101 | S.344 | Phoenix | Arizona | 1951 | | | |
| Welbie L. Fuller Residence | 5106 | S.347 | Pass Christian | Mississippi | 1951 | | Destroyed by Hurricane Camille 1969 | |
| Frank Lloyd Wright Field Office | 5226 | S.348 | San Francisco | California | 1951 | | Reconstructed at the Erie County Historical Society at the Hagen History Center | |
| Gabrielle Austin House (Broad Margin) | 5102 | S.345 | Greenville | South Carolina | 1951 | 1954 | | |
| A.K. Chahroudi Cottage | 5104 | S.346 | Lake Mahopac | New York | 1951 | | | |
| William Palmer Residence | 5021 | S.332 | Ann Arbor | Michigan | 1952 | | Available for short-term rental | |
| Arthur Pieper Residence | 5218 | S.349 | Paradise Valley | Arizona | 1952 | | | |
| Ray Brandes House | 5204 | S.350 | Sammamish | Washington | 1952 | 1952 | | |
| Quintin Blair House | 5203 | S.351 | Cody | Wyoming | 1952 | 1952–53 | | |
| Archie B. Teater Studio (Teater's Knoll) | 5211 | S.352 | Bliss | Idaho | 1952 | 1952 | | |
| R.W. Lindholm Residence (Mäntylä) | 5208 | S.353 | Cloquet | Minnesota | 1952 | | Reconstructed at Polymath Park, PA, available for short-term rental | |
| Frank S. Sander Residence (Springbough) | 5304 | S.354 | Stamford | Connecticut | 1952 | 1955 | | |
| Anderton Court Shops | 5032 | S.356 | Beverly Hills | California | 1952 | 1952 | | |
| George Lewis House (Spring House) | 5207 | S.359 | Tallahassee | Florida | 1952 | 1954 | | |
| Luis Marden House | 5220 | S.357 | McLean | Virginia | 1952 | Completed 1959 | | |
| Price Tower | 5215 | S.355 | Bartlesville | Oklahoma | 1952 | 1952–56 | | |
| Andrew B. Cooke House | 5219 | S.360 | Virginia Beach | Virginia | 1953 | Completed 1959 | | |
| Jorgine Boomer Cottage | 5305 | S.361 | Phoenix | Arizona | 1953 | | | |
| Robert Llewellyn Wright House | 5318 | S.358 | Bethesda | Maryland | 1953 | 1957 | | |
| Lewis H. Goddard Residence | 5317 | S.364 | Plymouth | Michigan | 1953 | | | |
| John and Syd Dobkins House | 5407 | S.362 | Canton | Ohio | 1953 | 1954 | | |
| I.N. Hagan House (Kentuck Knob) | 5410 | S.377 | Chalkhill | Pennsylvania | 1953 | 1953–56 | Tours available | |
| Harold Price Jr. Residence (Hillside) | 5421 | S.363 | Bartlesville | Oklahoma | 1954 | | | |
| Louis A. Penfield House | 5303 | S.365 | Willoughby Hills | Ohio | 1953 | 1955 | Available for short-term rental | |
| Riverview Terrace Restaurant | 5619 | S.367 | Spring Green | Wisconsin | 1953 | | Now the Frank Lloyd Wright Visitor Center | |
| Usonian Exhibition House and Pavilion | 5314 | S.369, S.370 | New York | New York | 1953 | 1953 | Temporary structure | |
| Ellis A. Feiman House | 5408 | S.371 | Canton | Ohio | 1954 | | | |
| E. Clarke and Julia Arnold House | 5401 | S.374 | Columbus | Wisconsin | 1954 | 1955–56 | | |
| Dr. Maurice Greenberg House | 5409 | S.372 | Dousman | Wisconsin | 1954 | | | |
| Hoffman Auto Showroom | 5622 | S.380 | New York | New York | 1954 | | Demolished 2013 | |
| Beth Sholom Synagogue | 5313 | S.373 | Elkins Park | Pennsylvania | 1954 | Completed 1959 | | |
| Los Angeles Exhibition Pavilion | | | Los Angeles | California | 1954 | 1954 | Temporary structure | |
| Bachman-Wilson House | 5402 | S.366 | Millstone | New Jersey | 1954 | 1954–56 | Reconstructed at Crystal Bridges Museum of American Art, Bentonville, AR, Tours available | |
| William L. Thaxton Jr. House | 5414 | S.384 | Bunker Hill Village | Texas | 1954 | | | |
| John E. Christian House (Samara) | 5405 | S.375 | West Lafayette | Indiana | 1954 | 1954–56 | Tours available | |
| Gerald B. and Beverley Tonkens House | 5510 | S.386 | Cincinnati | Ohio | 1954 | | | |
| Cedric G. and Patricia Neils Boulter House | 5403 | S.379 | Cincinnati | Ohio | 1954 | 1956 | | |
| Louis B. Fredrick House | 5432 | S.376 | Barrington Hills | Illinois | 1954 | 1957 | | |
| Karen Johnson Keland House | 5417 | S.368 | Mount Pleasant, Racine County | Wisconsin | 1954 | | | |
| Don E. Lovness Studio & Cottage | 5507 | S.391 | Stillwater | Minnesota | 1955 | 1958 | Studio completed in 1958 Cottage built 1972, but is not FLW's original design. | |
| Dorothy H. Turkel House | 5513 | S.388 | Detroit | Michigan | 1955 | | | |
| William B. Tracy House | 5512 | S.389 | Normandy Park | Washington | 1955 | 1956 | | |
| Toufic H. Kalil House | 5506 | S.387 | Manchester | New Hampshire | 1955 | 1955 | Owned by the Currier Museum of Art. tours available | |
| Kalita Humphreys Theater | 5514 | S.395 | Dallas | Texas | 1955 | Completed 1959 | | |
| Randall Fawcett House | 5418 | S.385 | Los Banos | California | 1955 | Completed 1961 | | |
| John L. Rayward House (Tirranna) | 5523 | S.383 | New Canaan | Connecticut | 1955 | 1955 | | |
| Maximilian Hoffman House | 5535 | S.390 | Rye | New York | 1955 | Completed 1972 | | |
| Theodore A. Pappas House | 5516 | S.392 | St. Louis | Missouri | 1955 | 1960–64 | | |
| Dr. Karl Kundert Medical Clinic | 5614 | S.396 | San Luis Obispo | California | 1955 | | | |
| Robert H. Sunday House | 5522 | S.393 | Marshalltown | Iowa | 1955 | 1957 | | |
| R.W. Lindholm Service Station | 5739 | S.414 | Cloquet | Minnesota | 1956 | 1956–58 | | |
| Frank Bott Residence | 5627 | S.404 | Kansas City | Missouri | 1956 | | | |
| Harold C. Price Sr. House | 5419 | S.378 | Paradise Valley | Arizona | 1956 | | | |
| Allen Friedman House | 5624 | S.403 | Bannockburn | Illinois | 1956 | | | |
| Dr. Kenneth L. Meyers Medical Clinic | 5613 | S.397 | Dayton | Ohio | 1956 | | | |
| Dudley Spencer House (Laurel) | 5635 | S.402 | Wilmington | Delaware | 1956 | 1956–61 | | |
| Annunciation Greek Orthodox Church | 5611 | S.399 | Wauwatosa | Wisconsin | 1956 | 1959–61 | | |
| Marshall Erdman Prefab House No. 1 | 5518 | S.406, S.407, S.408, S.409, S.410, S.411 | Various Locations | | 1956 | 1956–61 | Prototype design, nine examples constructed | |
| Eugene Van Tamelen House | 5518 | S.406 | Madison | Wisconsin | 1956 | 1956 | Erdman Prefab No. 1 | |
| Arnold Jackson House (Skyview) | 5518 | S.407.1 | Madison | Wisconsin | 1956 | 1957 | Erdman Prefab No. 1, reconstructed at Beaver Dam, WI 1985 | |
| Donald C. Duncan House | 5518 | S.407.2 | Lisle | Illinois | 1956 | 1957 | Erdman Prefab No. 1, reconstructed at Polymath Park, PA 2002, available for short-term rental | |
| Frank Iber House | 5518 | S.408 | Plover | Wisconsin | 1956 | 1957 | Erdman Prefab No. 1 | |
| Carl Post House | 5518 | S.409.1 | Barrington Hills | Illinois | 1956 | 1957 | Erdman Prefab No. 1 | |
| William Cass House (Crimson Beech) | 5518 | S.409.2 | Staten Island | New York | 1956 | 1959 | Erdman Prefab No. 1 | |
| Socrates Zaferiou House | 5518 | S.410 | Blauvelt | New York | 1956 | 1961 | Erdman Prefab No. 1 | |
| Joseph Mollica House | 5518 | S.411.1 | Wauwatosa | Wisconsin | 1956 | 1958 | Erdman Prefab No. 1 | |
| Dr. Edward & Laura Jane LaFond House | 5518 | S.411.2 | St. Joseph | Minnesota | 1956 | 1960 | Erdman Prefab No. 1 | |
| Marshall Erdman Prefab House No. 2 | 5706 | S.412.1, S.412.2 | Various Locations | | 1956 | 1957 | Prototype design, two examples constructed | |
| Walter Rudin House | 5706 | S.412.1 | Madison | Wisconsin | 1956 | 1957–59 | Erdman Prefab No. 2 | |
| James B. McBean Residence | 5706 | S.412.2 | Rochester | Minnesota | 1956 | 1957 | Erdman Prefab No. 2 | |
| Wyoming Valley School | 5741 | S.401 | Wyoming | Wisconsin | 1957 | | | |
| Marin County Civic Center | 5746, 5753, | S.415, S.416, S.417 | San Rafael | California | 1957 | Completed 1976 | | |
| William P. Boswell Residence | 5704 | S.423 | Indian Hill | Ohio | 1957 | Completed 1961 | | |
| C.E. Gordon House | 5710 | S.419 | Wilsonville | Oregon | 1957 | Completed 1963 | Reconstructed at Silverton, OR 2001, tours available | |
| Paul J. and Ida Trier House | 5724 | S.398 | Johnston | Iowa | 1957 | 1957 | | |
| Robert G. Walton House | 5623 | S.421 | Modesto | California | 1957 | | | |
| Dr. Herman T. Fasbender Medical Clinic | 5730 | S.424 | Hastings | Minnesota | 1957 | 1959 | | |
| Wichita State University Corbin Education Center | 5708 | S.418 | Wichita | Kansas | 1957 | Completed 1963 | | |
| Sterling Kinney Residence | 5717 | S.422 | Amarillo | Texas | 1957 | | | |
| Carl E. Schultz House | 5745 | S.426 | St. Joseph | Michigan | 1957 | 1957 | | |
| Duey and Julia Wright House | 5831 | S.420 | Wausau | Wisconsin | 1957 | 1959 | | |
| Dr. George Ablin House | 5812 | S.428 | Bakersfield | California | 1958 | | | |
| Pilgrim Congregational Church | 5818 | S.431 | Redding | California | 1958 | 1960–63 | | |
| Don M. Stromquist House | 5626 | S.429 | Bountiful | Utah | 1958 | 1959 | | |
| Seth C. Peterson Cottage | 5821 | S.430 | Mirror Lake | Wisconsin | 1958 | 1958 | Available for short-term rental | |
| Lockridge Medical Clinic | 5813 | S.425 | Whitefish | Montana | 1958 | 1960 | Demolished 2018 | |
| Paul Olfelt House | 5820 | S.427 | St. Louis Park | Minnesota | 1958 | | | |
| Grady Gammage Memorial Auditorium | 5904 | S.432 | Tempe | Arizona | 1959 | 1962–64 | Design completed by William Wesley Peters | |
| Norman Lykes House | 5908 | S.433 | Phoenix | Arizona | 1959 | Completed 1968 | Design completed by John Rattenbury | |

== Posthumously-built work ==
| Name | City, state/country | Designed | Built | Other information | Image |
|---|---|---|---|---|---|
| First Christian Church | Phoenix, Arizona | 1950 | 1973 | Adapted from unbuilt design for Southwest Christian Seminary | |
| Arthur and Bruce Brooks Pfeiffer House | Scottsdale, Arizona | 1938 | 1974 | Adapted from unbuilt design for Ralph Jester | |
| Whiteford-Haddock House | Ann Arbor, Michigan | 1941 | 1979 | Adapted from unbuilt design for Roy Peterson | |
| King Kamehameha Golf Course Clubhouse | Waikapu, Maui, Hawaii | 1949–57 | 1993 | Adapted from unbuilt designs for Robert F. Windfohr (1949), Raúl Baillères (1952), and Arthur Miller (1957) | |
| Monona Terrace Community and Convention Center | Madison, Wisconsin | 1938–59 | 1997 | Adapted from unbuilt design | |
| Scottsdale Spire | Scottsdale, Arizona | 1957 | 2004 | Adapted from unbuilt design for Arizona State Capitol | |
| Blue Sky Mausoleum | Buffalo, New York | 1928 | 2004 | Adapted from unbuilt design for Darwin D. Martin. | |
| Joseph Massaro House | Lake Mahopac, New York | 1949 | 2004–07 | Adapted from unbuilt design for A.K. Chahroudi | |
| Fontana Boathouse | Buffalo, New York | 1905 | 2007 | Adapted from unbuilt design for the Yahara Boat Club | |
| Marc Coleman House | Greystones, County Wicklow, Ireland | 1959 | 2007 | Adapted from unbuilt design for Gilbert Wieland | |
| Buffalo Filling Station at the Pierce-Arrow Museum | Buffalo, New York | 1927 | 2013–14 | Adapted from unbuilt design | |
| Sharp Family Tourism and Education Center | Lakeland, Florida | 1939 | 2013 | Adapted from unbuilt design | |
| Pauline and Louis A. Penfield House II | Willoughby Hills, Ohio | 1959 | 2025 | Adapted from unbuilt design for Penfield House II | |

== Notable unbuilt work ==
- Lake Tahoe Summer Colony, Emerald Bay, Lake Tahoe, California, 1923
- Gordon Strong Automobile Objective, Sugarloaf Mountain, Maryland, 1924
- San Marcos In The Desert, Chandler, Arizona, 1929
- Crystal Heights, Washington, DC, 1940
- Cooperative Homesteads, Madison Heights, MI, 1942
- Calico Mills Store for Gautam Sarabhai, Ahmedabad, India, 1946
- Cottage Studio for Ayn Rand, Connecticut, 1946
- Rogers Lacy Hotel, Dallas, Texas, 1946
- Point Park Civic Center, Pittsburgh, Pennsylvania, 1947
- Angelo Masieri Memorial, Venice, Veneto, Italy, 1951–53
- The "Mile-High" Illinois, Chicago, Illinois, 1956
- Plan for Greater Baghdad, Iraq, 1957–58
