= George Blossom House =

House in Chicago, Illinois

Coordinates: 41.8062°N 87.5939°W

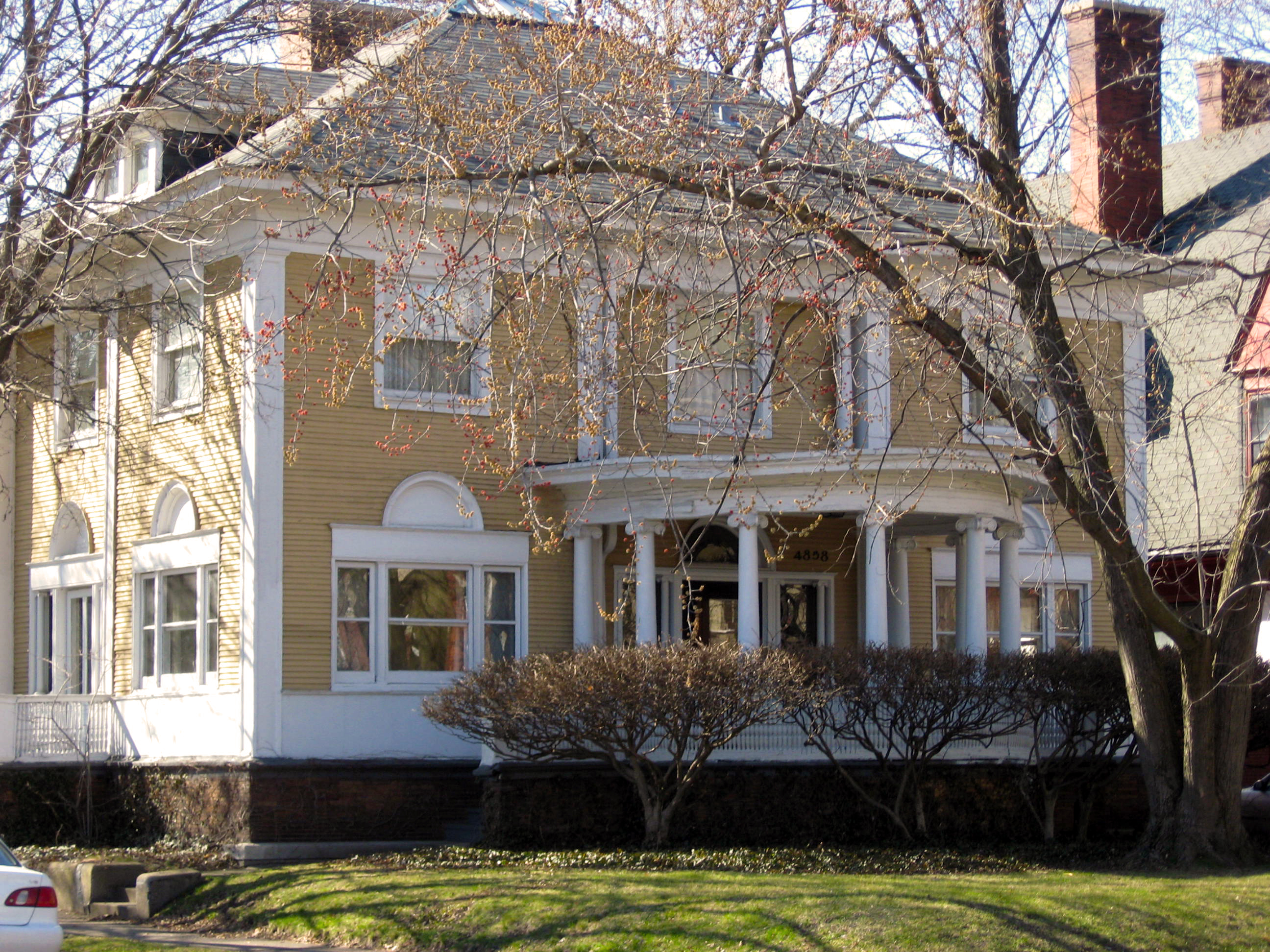
George Blossom House

The George Blossom House is located at 4858 South Kenwood Avenue in Chicago, Illinois. It was designed by architect Frank Lloyd Wright in 1892, while Wright was still working in the firm of Adler and Sullivan. As Wright was working as a draftsman for Adler and Sullivan, he was forbidden from taking outside commissions. He later referred to these designs as his "bootleg houses".

A fine example of a Colonial Revival design, the building is almost symmetrical, broken up by a conservatory on the rear of the building.

== See also ==
- List of Frank Lloyd Wright works
