= Harrison P. Young House =

Historic house in Oak Park, Illinois

- U.S. Historic district – Contributing property
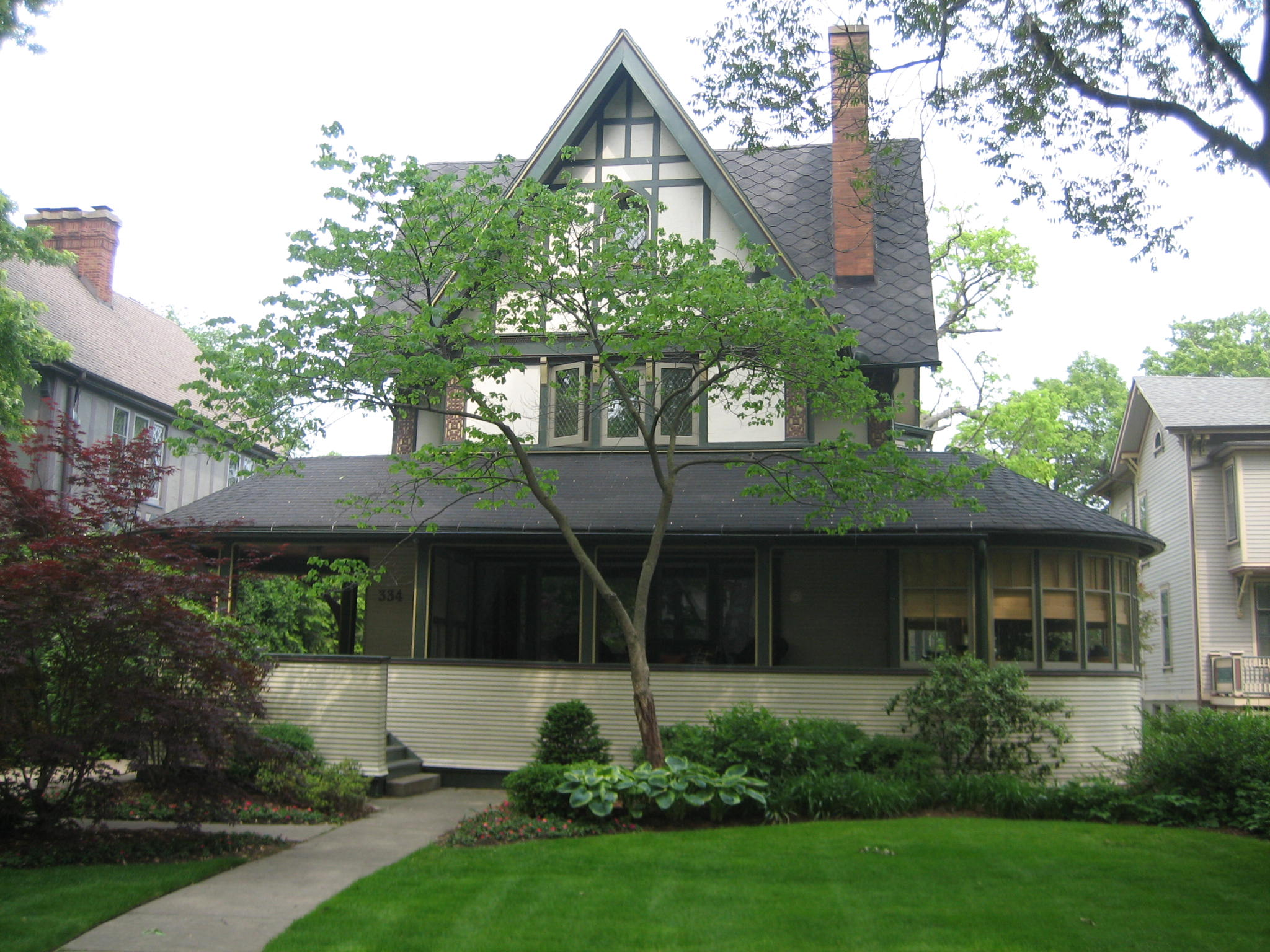

- Location within Illinois Location within the United States
- Interactive map showing the location of Harrison P. Young House
- Location: 334 N. Kenilworth Ave., Oak Park, Illinois, United States
- Coordinates: 41°53′32″N 87°47′49″W
- Built: 1895
- Architect: Frank Lloyd Wright
- Architectural style: Tudor Revival, Gothic Revival (Medieval Revival)
- Part of: Frank Lloyd Wright-Prairie School of Architecture Historic District (ID73000699)
- Added to NRHP: December 4, 1973

The Harrison P. Young House is a home at 334 N. Kenilworth Avenue in Oak Park, a suburb of Chicago, Illinois, United States. The 1870s era building was remodeled extensively by famous American architect Frank Lloyd Wright, early in his career, in 1895. The home's remodeling incorporated elements that would later be found in Wright's pioneering, early modern Prairie style. Some of the remodel work included setting the home back an additional 16 ft (4.88 m) from the street and an overhanging porch over the driveway. The House is similar in some ways to Wright's other early work and was influenced by his first teacher, Joseph Silsbee. The house is considered a contributing property to both a local and federally Registered Historic District. It is currently a private residence.

== Architecture ==
The Harrison P. Young House was first built during the 1870s for Harrison P. Young based upon a design by William E. Coman. In 1895 it was remodeled by famous American architect Frank Lloyd Wright for the same client. The Young House is atypical to the other design work by Wright found in the neighborhood, though, its steeply pitched roof is closely identified with some of his other early work. The Young House was perhaps most influenced by Wright's design for the Nathan G. Moore House, which was designed during the same period in a Tudor Revival style. Wright's 1895 remodel was significant and included structural modifications; before any other work began the house was pushed back an additional 16 ft (4.88 m) from the street.

Following on, Wright affixed a large addition to the home, faced with narrow banded clapboarding (found in much of Wright's early work), the addition held a new living room, second-floor bedroom and a large porch. Wright's sweeping, utilitarian porch overhangs, meant to allow access to the carriage during the rain, were cantilevered over the entry drive. It is the sweep of Wright's eaves, throughout the remodel, that give the home a distinctly modern Wrightian character. The high-pitched gabled roof is reminiscent of the roof lines in the Irving Clark House in suburban LaGrange, Illinois. In the Clark house too, the main gable of the house is bisected by another perpendicular gable. Both homes also feature prominent chimneys constructed from Roman brick. Chimneys such as these became hallmarks of Wright's Prairie style work and of his work throughout his career. The large chimney is symbolic of the significance of the hearth in a warm, family-centered environment.

In the Young House some of the elements that Wright would go to use in his signature early modern Prairie style are recognizable. The most obvious element which is immediately visible is the thin, narrow clapboarding, which provides some of the horizontal emphasis for which Prairie style is known. Other features are more representative of Wright's earliest work with architect Joseph Silsbee, such as the soaring roof lines.

== Significance ==
The house is most significant for the preview it gives of Wright's Prairie style, and the home utilizes many elements that would later become an important part of that school. The house is also recognized by the United States federal government as a contributing property to the Frank Lloyd Wright-Prairie School of Architecture Historic District. The village of Oak Park has its own, local version of the federal historic district and the Young House is part of that district as well. The federal Frank Lloyd Wright Historic District was added to the U.S. National Register of Historic Places on December 4, 1973.

== See also ==
- List of Frank Lloyd Wright works
- Thomas Gale House
- Walter Gale House
