= Kundert Medical Clinic =

Hospital in California, United States

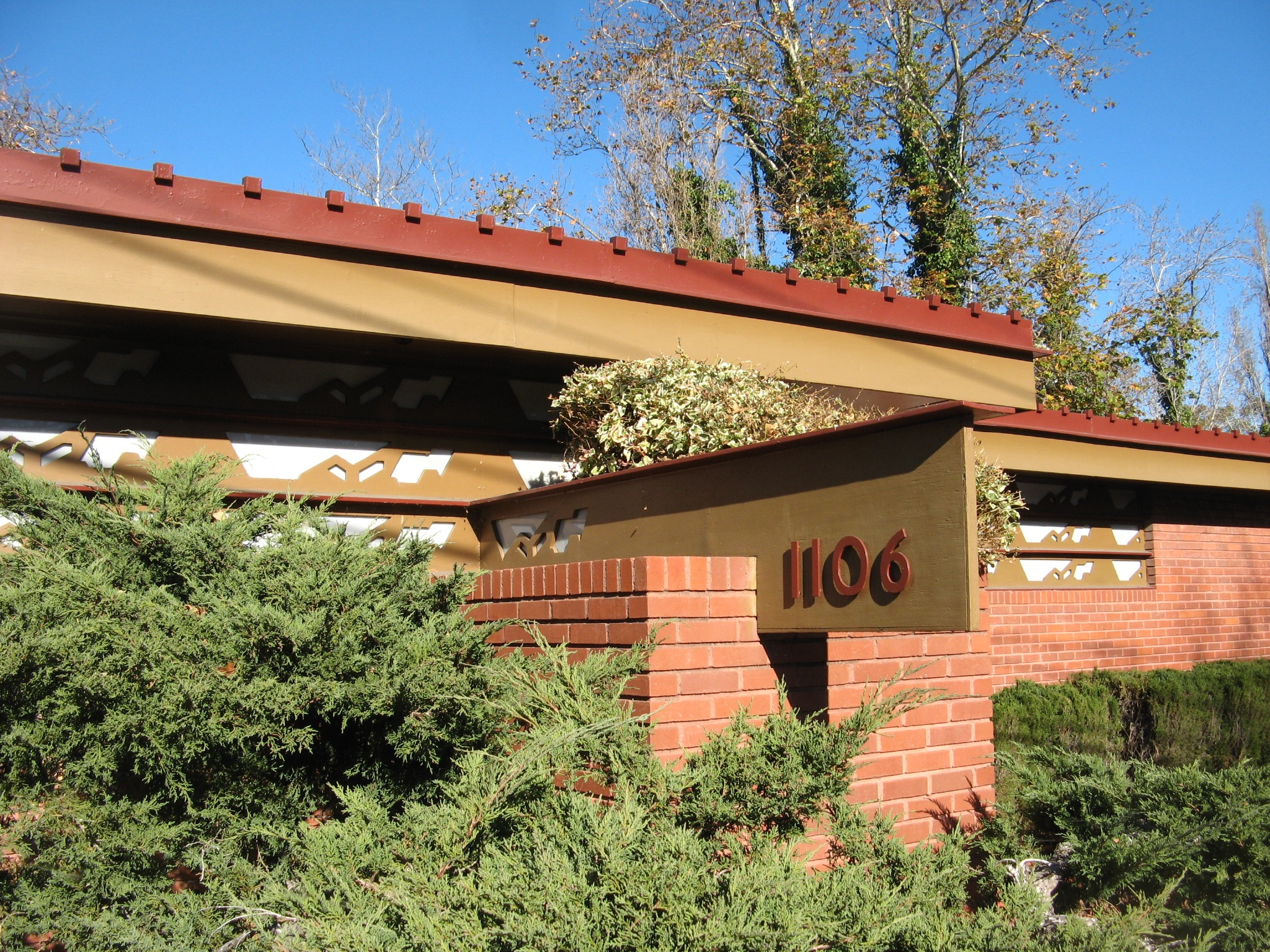

- Location within California

General information
- Architectural style: Usonian
- Location: San Luis Obispo, California, United States
- Coordinates: 35°16′50.57″N 120°39′28.84″W
- Current tenants: Kenneth Tway, MD
- Construction started: January 1956
- Completed: September 1956
- Client: Dr. Karl Kundert

Design and construction
- Architect: Frank Lloyd Wright

The Kundert Medical Clinic is a building in San Luis Obispo, California, United States. Designed by Frank Lloyd Wright and completed in 1956, it was one of the few commercial buildings designed by Wright.

Dr. Karl Kundert and his tenant, Dr. Fogo, were both ophthalmologists from Wisconsin and were familiar with Wright's work. (Storrer, 425) The construction of the building was supervised by Wright protégé, Aaron Green.

This building is now occupied by cardiologist Kenneth Tway.

== See also ==
- List of Frank Lloyd Wright works
