= Pilgrim Congregational Church (Redding, California) =

Church building in California designed by Frank Lloyd Wright

- Location within California Location within the United States

Religion
- Affiliation: United Church of Christ
- Status: active

Location
- Location: 2850 Foothill Blvd, Redding, CA 96001
- Coordinates: 40.583641°N 122.412983°W

Architecture
- Architect: Frank Lloyd Wright
- Style: Pole and Boulder Gothic
- Groundbreaking: June, 1960
- Completed: 1963

Website
- http://www.pilgrimchurchredding.org/

Pilgrim Congregational Church in Redding, California was designed in 1958 by the American architect Frank Lloyd Wright, and built between 1960 and 1963.

One of the parishioners contacted Wright, the architect, to inquire about designing a building. Mr. Wright responded to the proposal in January 1958 with these words: "Tell the people of the little church service that I will help them out. If I like the ‘feel’ of a job, I take it."

This church is one of Wright's last designs and the last church designed by Wright before he died in 1959. Referring to the church's design, Wright once said, "this little church" was designed as a "Pole and Boulder Gothic". The design was to represent the form of a tent, the ancient dwelling of Israel, as a symbol of temporary, migratory and transient lives. Wright died before he could finish all the drawings for the church.

Unable to secure a bid within their budget, the congregation's building committee voted to build the church themselves. With oversight from Wright's successor firm, Taliesin Associated Architects, excavation began in June, 1960. With its massive desert rubblestone walls and the 23 giant steel and concrete roof supports that envelop the building, the church seems almost to grow out of the rocky hillside setting. The pulpit area was designed to resemble a cave. The building was dedicated in 1963.

The full plans of the multi-building design are yet to be realized. There is a fireplace in the fellowship hall, which is used as the sanctuary. This wing was to extend into the middle of today's parking lot where it would intersect the real, 300 seat sanctuary, 100 seat chapel wing, and 17 classroom church school wing - all in a triangular fashion. This central core would have been topped off by a massive, boulder belfry tower at the south end housing the minister's study on its upper floor.

== See also ==
- List of Frank Lloyd Wright works
