= James B. Christie House =

House in Bernardsville, New Jersey

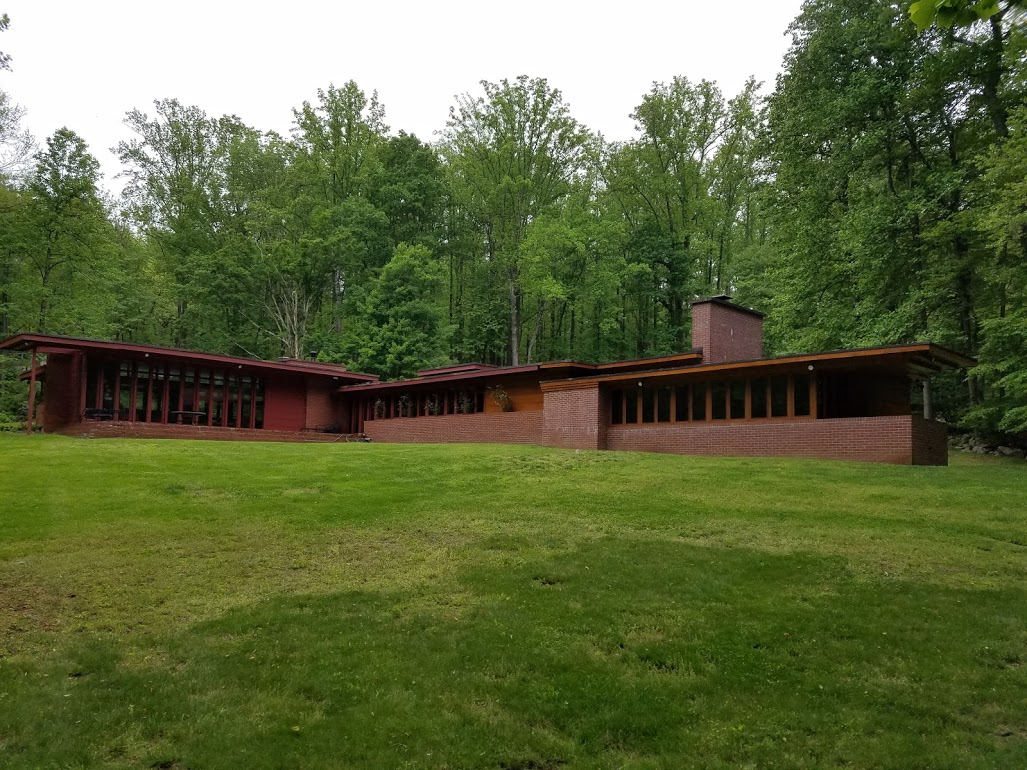

- Location within Somerset County, New Jersey

General information
- Type: House
- Architectural style: Usonian
- Location: 190 Jockey Hollow Rd, Bernardsville, NJ 07924
- Coordinates: 40.755264°N 74.558182°W
- Construction started: 1940

Technical details
- Floor area: 2,000 sq ft (190 m^{2})

Design and construction
- Architect: Frank Lloyd Wright

The James B. Christie House is a large, flat-roofed Usonian on a wooded site in Bernardsville, in Somerset County, New Jersey, United States. The Christie House, built in 1940, is Frank Lloyd Wright's oldest and, at 2,000 square feet (190 m^{2}), Wright's largest house in New Jersey. The residence has one story and is made of brick, cypress, and redwood.

It is designed in an L-shaped plan with a rectangular living room and a dining area that is perpendicular to a wing with three bedrooms and three baths. The kitchen is in the corner of the L, like a hinge connecting the two sections, separating public from private areas. The flat roof with its overhanging soffit reinforces the sprawling horizontal design.

Wright advised James B. Christie, his first New Jersey client, to select a setting that has "as much individuality as to topography and features—stream, trees, etc. and as much freedom from adjacent buildings as is possible."

== See also ==
- List of Frank Lloyd Wright works
