= Charles A. Brown House =

House in Evanston, Illinois

Coordinates: 42°03′47″N 87°42′28″W

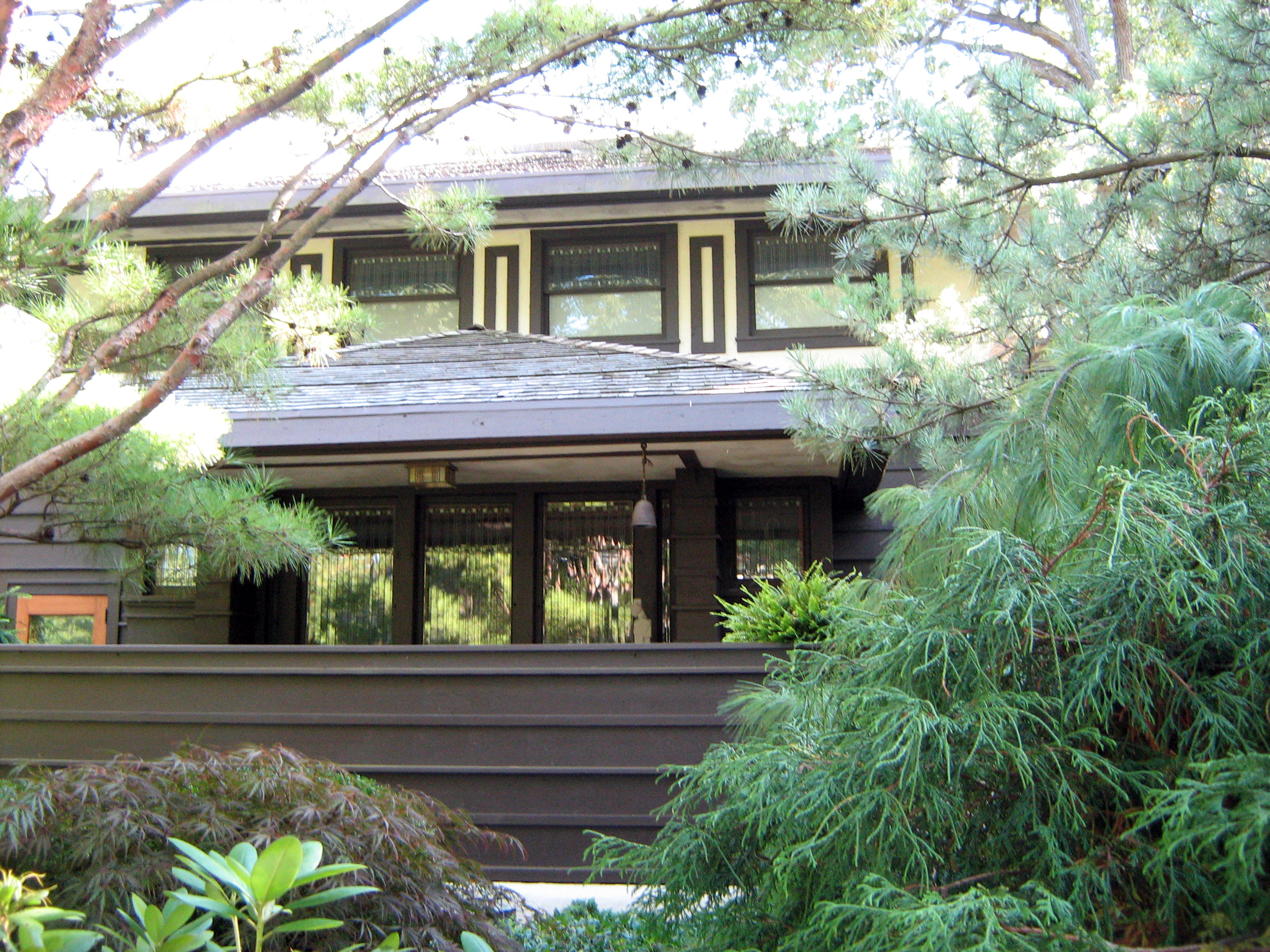
Charles A. Brown House

The Charles A. Brown House is a two-story home on 2420 Harrison Street in Evanston, Illinois, designed in 1905 by American architect Frank Lloyd Wright. The building is a two-story clapboard home with four bedrooms and one bathroom on the second floor. The structure also has one of the last examples of sash windows in a Wright-designed building.

== See also ==
- List of Frank Lloyd Wright works
