= Como Orchards Summer Colony =

Development in Darby, Montana

Coordinates: 46.030663°N 114.217869°W

Como Orchards Club, designed by Frank Lloyd Wright in 1909 and located near Darby, Montana, was part of a land development scheme (Como Orchards) inspired by the western railroad expansion.

By 1909 three rail lines ran to Missoula, Montana, and when the Northern Pacific Railway connected a spur south to the Bitterroot Valley, transportation of people and products became increasingly easy. The establishment of the Bitter Root irrigation district and construction of the Lake Como Dam and the Big Ditch Canal, both financed by the Chicago investor W. I. Moody and supervised by F. D. Nichols, enabled promoters to attract new investors (particularly college professors from the University of Chicago and intellectuals) with hopes of establishing a huge apple-growing industry in the valley.

Wright was asked to design the master plan, clubhouse, land office building, and cottages, while Marion Mahony Griffin and William Eugene Drummond supervised the project. At least fifty-three cottages were originally planned around the clubhouse (which had a two-story lounge and a large dining room with vast, open porches and three large stone fireplaces) but only twelve were constructed. The small frame structures had stone fireplaces but were built cheaply as seasonal, camp-like housing, with no central heat and pine blocks instead of foundations. The two-bedroom cottages had no kitchen space, while the three-bedroom versions had a kitchen and a porch.

Unpredictable weather and enormous shipping problems caused the project to fail. Wright lost money when the bank foreclosed in 1916. While several cottages stood until the late 1930s, others were gradually torn down. The clubhouse was altered, whitewashed, and used to house workers and store hog feed. In 1945 the boards were taken to build a barn. Now only the abandoned land office building and one three-bedroom cottage remain.

== See also ==
- List of Frank Lloyd Wright works
