= Rose Pauson House =

House in Phoenix, Arizona (1939–1943)

Coordinates: 33.519825°N 112.013406°W

The Rose Pauson House in Phoenix, Arizona, was designed by Frank Lloyd Wright in 1939 and built 1940–1942.

The neighborhood was platted and first recorded as the new Alta Vista Park Estates in 1928 just before the Great Depression. The depression and long, slow economic recovery meant little real estate and new home construction occurred on the neighboring lots until the late 1930s when the luxury home was planned.

The building was located on a hillock on the present alignment of 32nd Street.

In 1943 the house burned down when a fallen ember from the fireplace ignited a hand-woven curtain on a nearby window. All that remained were the ruins of the foundation and walls.

The ruins became a local landmark known as "Shiprock" due to their prominent shape and location. Plans to remove the ruins, in order to extend 32nd Street through the site, created a public protest. The road was extended, but only after the protests resulted in the loss of federal funds intended for the project. The rear chimney mass (serving the master bedroom fireplace-furnace flues), all that remains of the ruins, was moved south in 1979 as a permanent monument marking the entrance to the Alta Vista Park Estates subdivision of the neighborhood land.

== Gallery ==
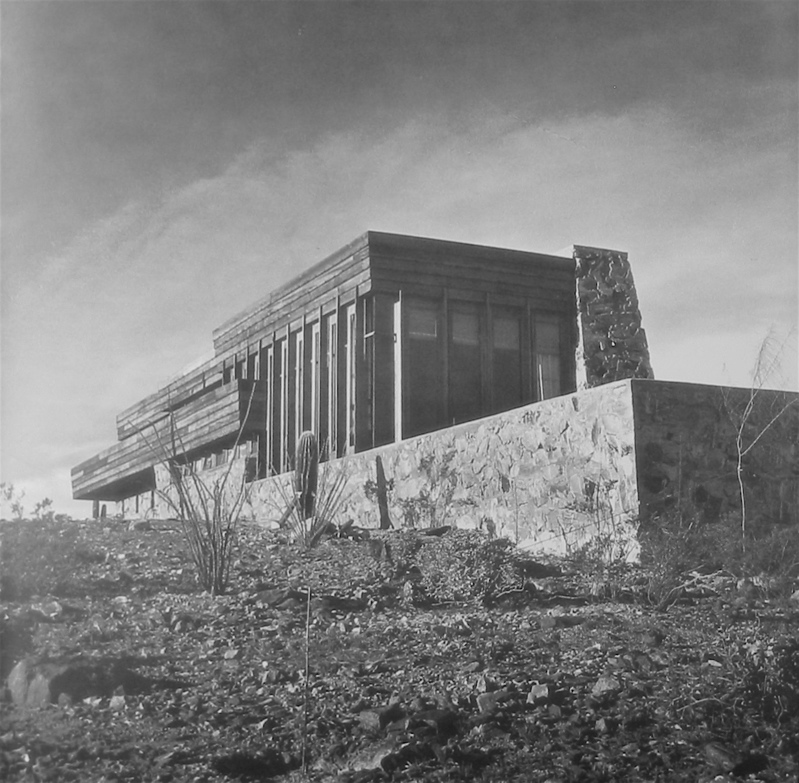
The house before its destruction

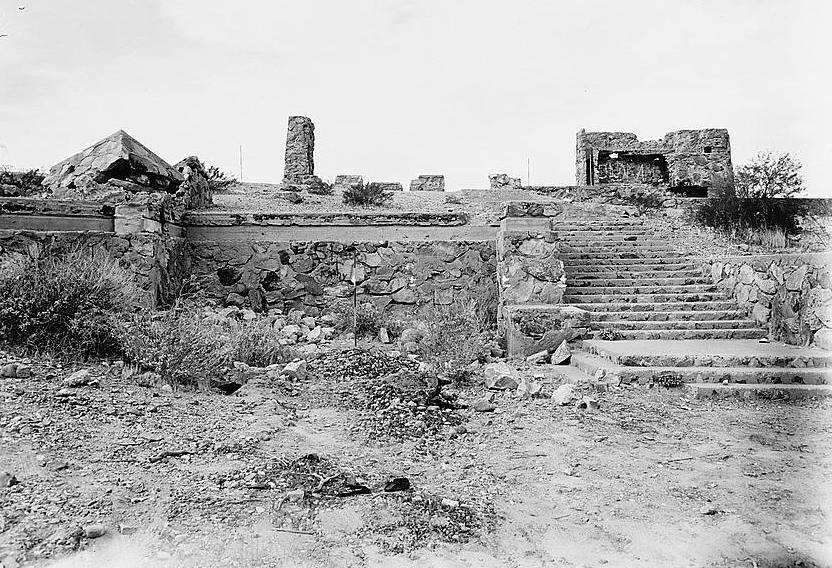
Shiprock ruins, 1979

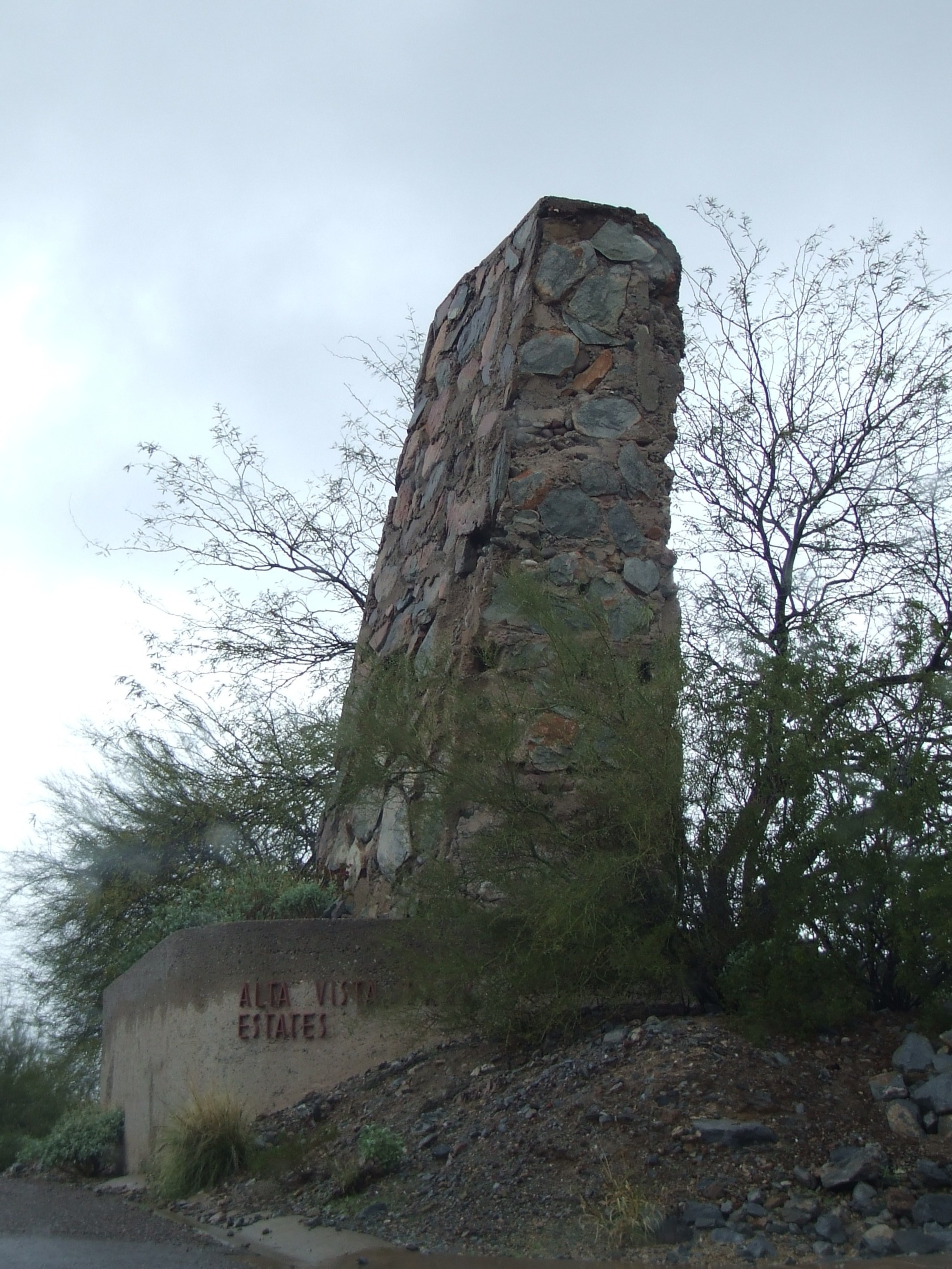
Shiprock chimney, 2010

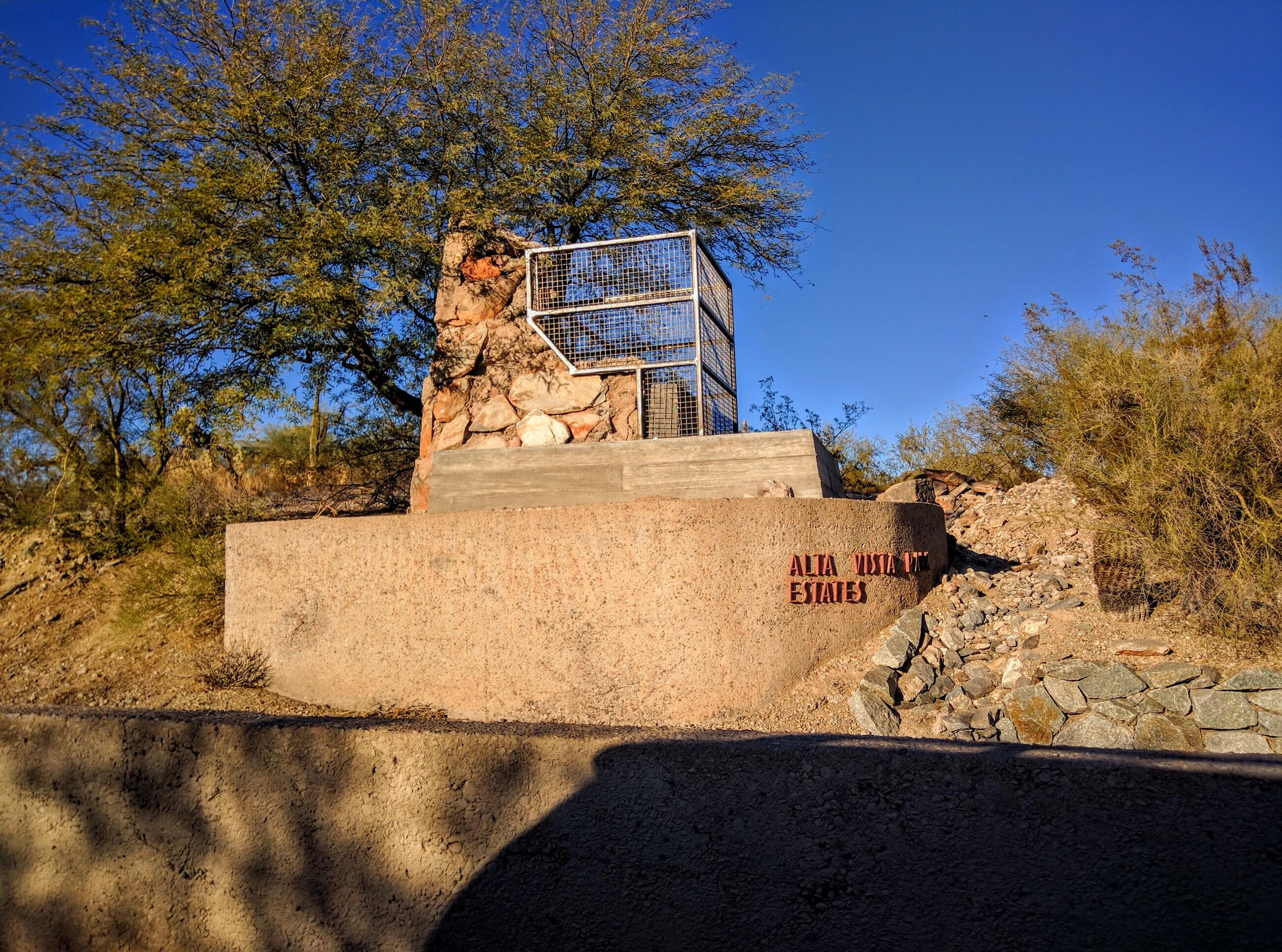
Remains of the Rose Pauson chimney landmark "Shiprock", 2017

== See also ==
- List of Frank Lloyd Wright works
