= Chauncey L. Williams Residence =

Historic house in River Forest, Illinois

Coordinates: 41.8893°N 87.8277°W

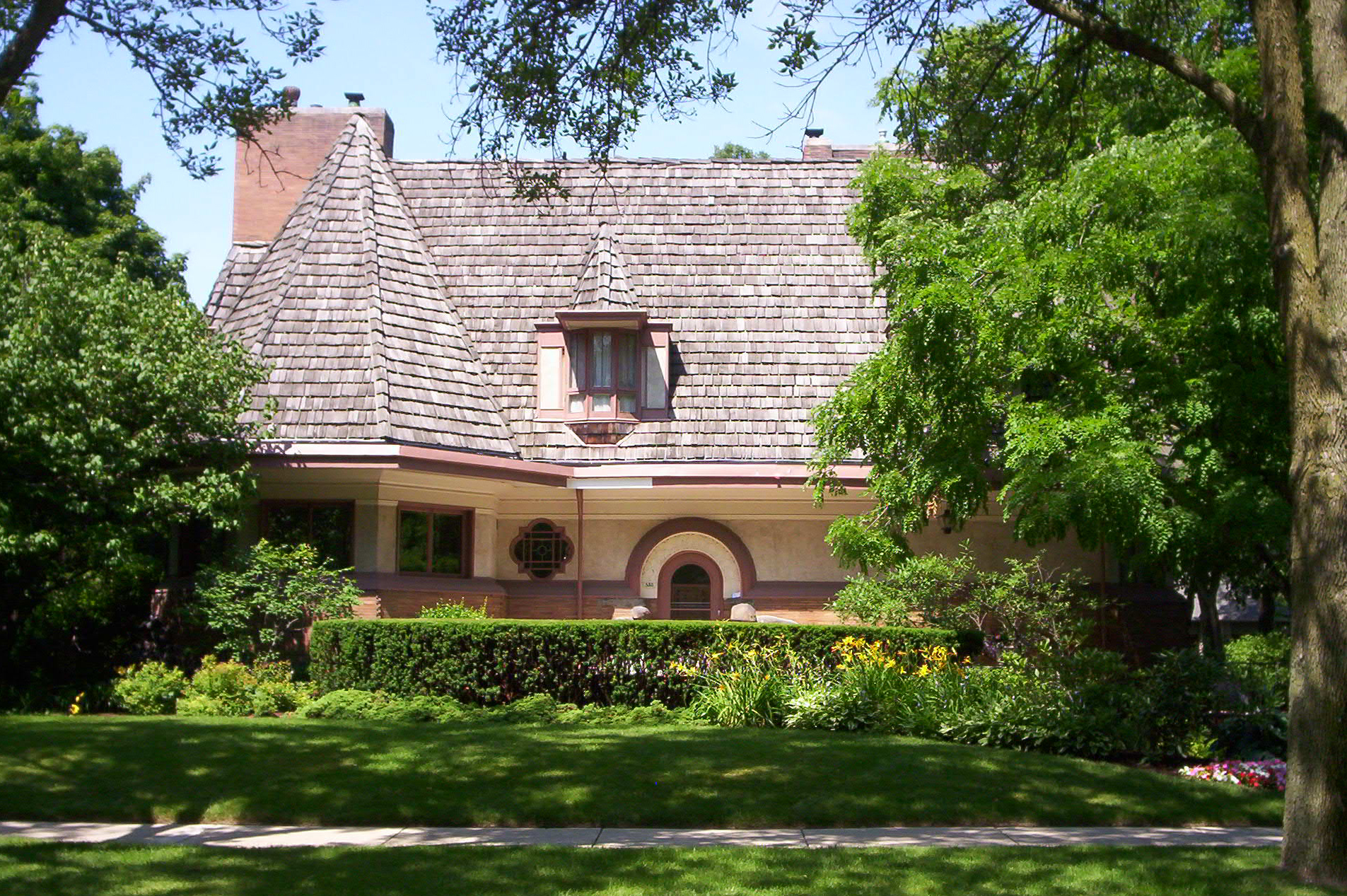
Chauncey L. Williams House from the street

The Chauncey L. Williams House, at 530 Edgewood Place in River Forest, Illinois, is a residence designed by Frank Lloyd Wright. The house was built in 1895 of Roman brick and plaster. It was one of Wright's earliest Chicago commissions.

The house reflects the influence of Japanese design on Wright, who was a collector of Japanese prints.

Wright's client, Chauncey L. Williams, was a member of a wealthy Midwestern family; he was active in cultural and literary pursuits. With W. Irving Way, Williams formed the Way and Williams publishing firm (1895–1898). Wright and Williams had attended the University of Wisconsin together and remained friends afterward. The two men co-operated in literary pursuits. The house has remained a private residence, never opened to public tours. It was placed for sale in November 2026.

== See also ==
- List of Frank Lloyd Wright works
