= Rollin Furbeck House =

Historic house in Illinois, United States

- U.S. Historic district – Contributing property
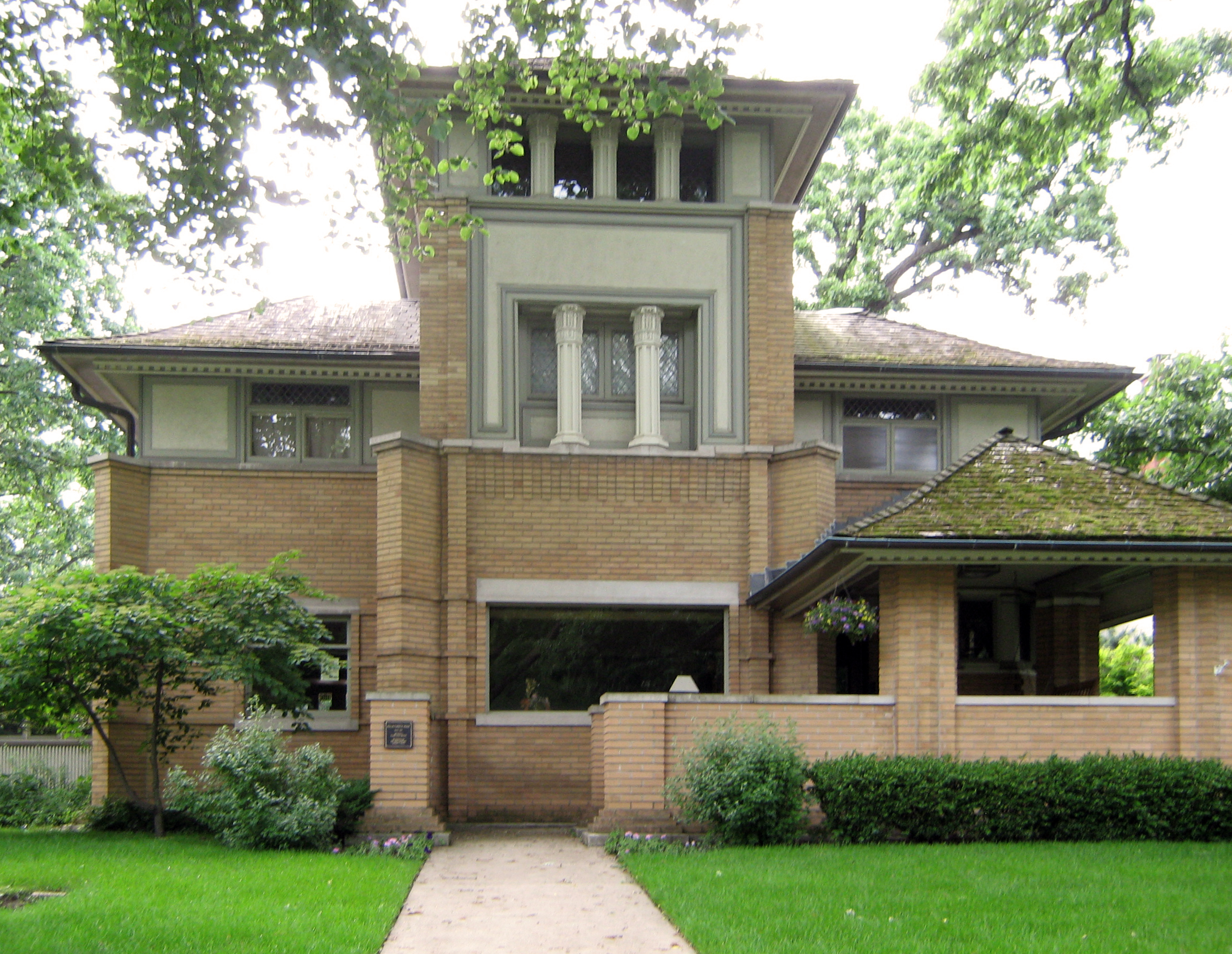

- Location within Illinois
- Location: 515 Fair Oaks Ave, Oak Park,
- Coordinates: 41°53′42.4″N 87°47′19″W
- Area: Oak Park
- Built: 1897
- Architect: Frank Lloyd Wright
- Architectural style: Prairie Style
- Part of: Frank Lloyd Wright-Prairie School of Architecture Historic District (ID73000699)
- Added to NRHP: December 4, 1973

Rollin Furbeck House is a Frank Lloyd Wright designed house in Oak Park, Illinois that was built in 1897. It is part of the Frank Lloyd Wright-Prairie School of Architecture Historic District.

The house was built in 1897 for married couple Rollin and Elizabeth Furbeck, who lived there until 1899. Since 1998, it has been owned by the Abrahamson family, which placed it for sale in 2025.

== Architecture ==
The Furbeck House has 5,000 square feet (460 m^{2}) across three stories. The house has a cruciform layout, unlike his previous designs, which were either square or rectangular.

In contrast with many of Wright's previous designs, he experimented with vertical elements (such as the three-story center tower and octagonal columns). Wright incorporated features that he later used in other buildings, including the addition of similar design details on different stories; simple geometric shapes; a serpentine path to the front entrance; and visually-protective colonnettes in front of textured diamond-paned windows.

Inside are 5 bedrooms and 3.5 bathrooms, including an attic with 2 bedrooms. Wright used large amounts of natural light to allow a free flow of space; woodwork was also used to create an ambient effect of warmth and coziness. He also incorporated picture windows and a massive concrete fireplace.

== See also ==
- List of Frank Lloyd Wright works
