= Fred B. Jones House =

Historic house in Delavan, Wisconsin

- Fred B. Jones House ("Penwern")
- U.S. National Register of Historic Places
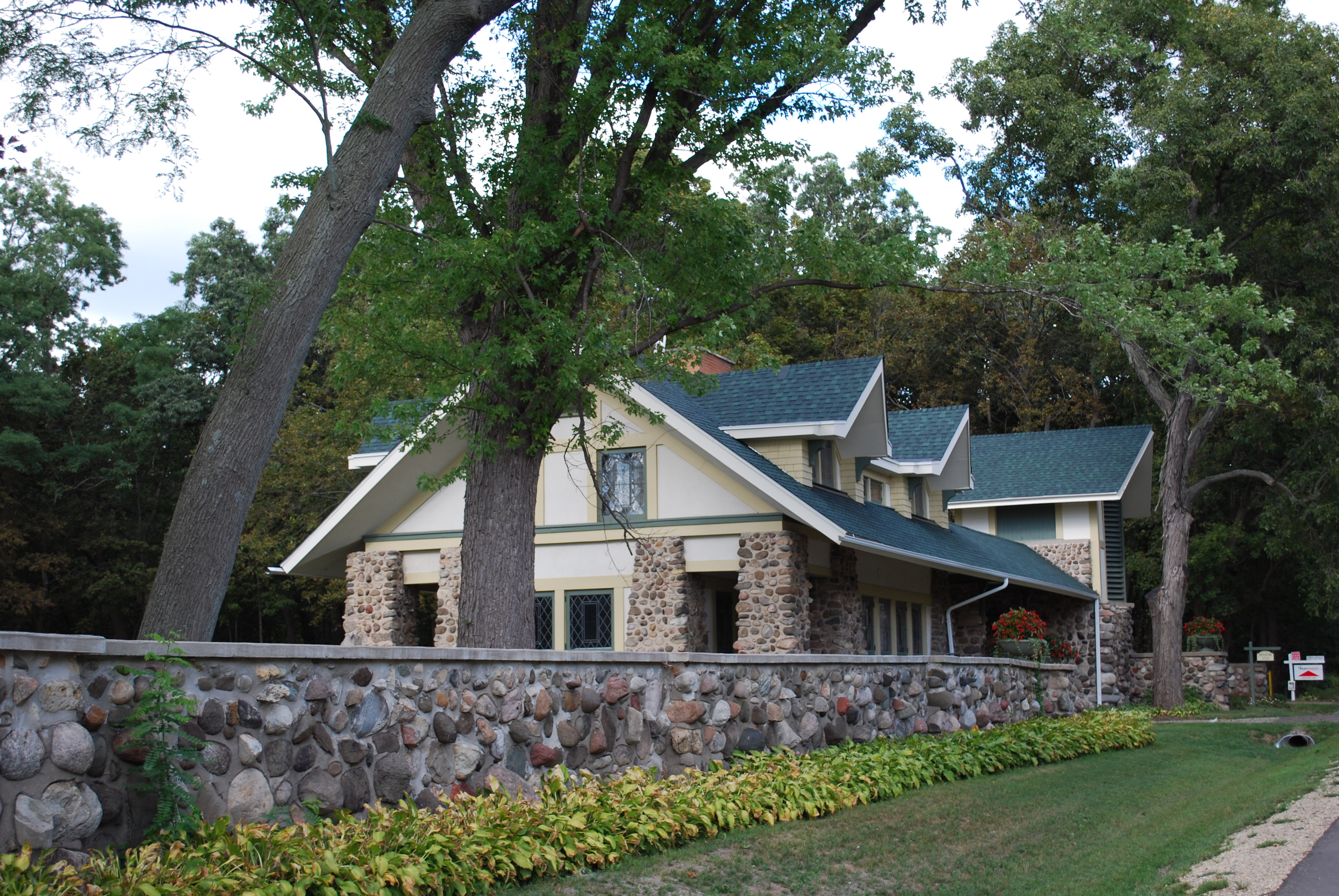

- Location within Wisconsin
- Location: Delavan, Wisconsin
- Coordinates: 42°35′36.68″N 88°36′41.27″W
- Built: 1903
- Architect: Frank Lloyd Wright
- Architectural style: Prairie School
- NRHP reference No.: 74000134
- Added to NRHP: December 27, 1974

The Fred B. Jones House is part of an estate called Penwern in Delavan, Wisconsin, designed by Frank Lloyd Wright and constructed from 1900 to 1903. It was listed on the National Register of Historic Places in 1974.

Fred Jones was a Chicago bachelor-businessman who had this estate on Lake Delavan built as a weekend cottage and a place to throw summer parties. Wright designed all the buildings, each different. They were built while Wright's ideas were developing, and though the buildings fit nicely into their natural surroundings and emphasize the horizontal, they lack the flat roofs and lines that we now think of as Wright's Prairie Style.

The boathouse was built first, in 1900, with rising ridgepoles and flaring eaves that suggest Japanese architecture more overtly than most of Wright's designs. The main house was built in 1901, with gable roofs, a living room facing the lake, and broad arches, one over a porte-cochère. The gatehouse was built in 1903, with a gable roof, two Gothic-like dormers, and a two-story tower to which the men could retreat for late-night poker. The stable was also built in 1903, a gable-roofed building whose design looks more Wrightian than like a Wisconsin barn.

The name "Penwern" may have come from the farm of Wright's grandmother back in Wales.

The boathouse burned in 1978, but was reconstructed around 2005.

== See also ==
- National Register of Historic Places listings in Walworth County, Wisconsin
- List of Frank Lloyd Wright works
