= Goetsch–Winckler House =

House in Okemos, Michigan

- U.S. National Register of Historic Places
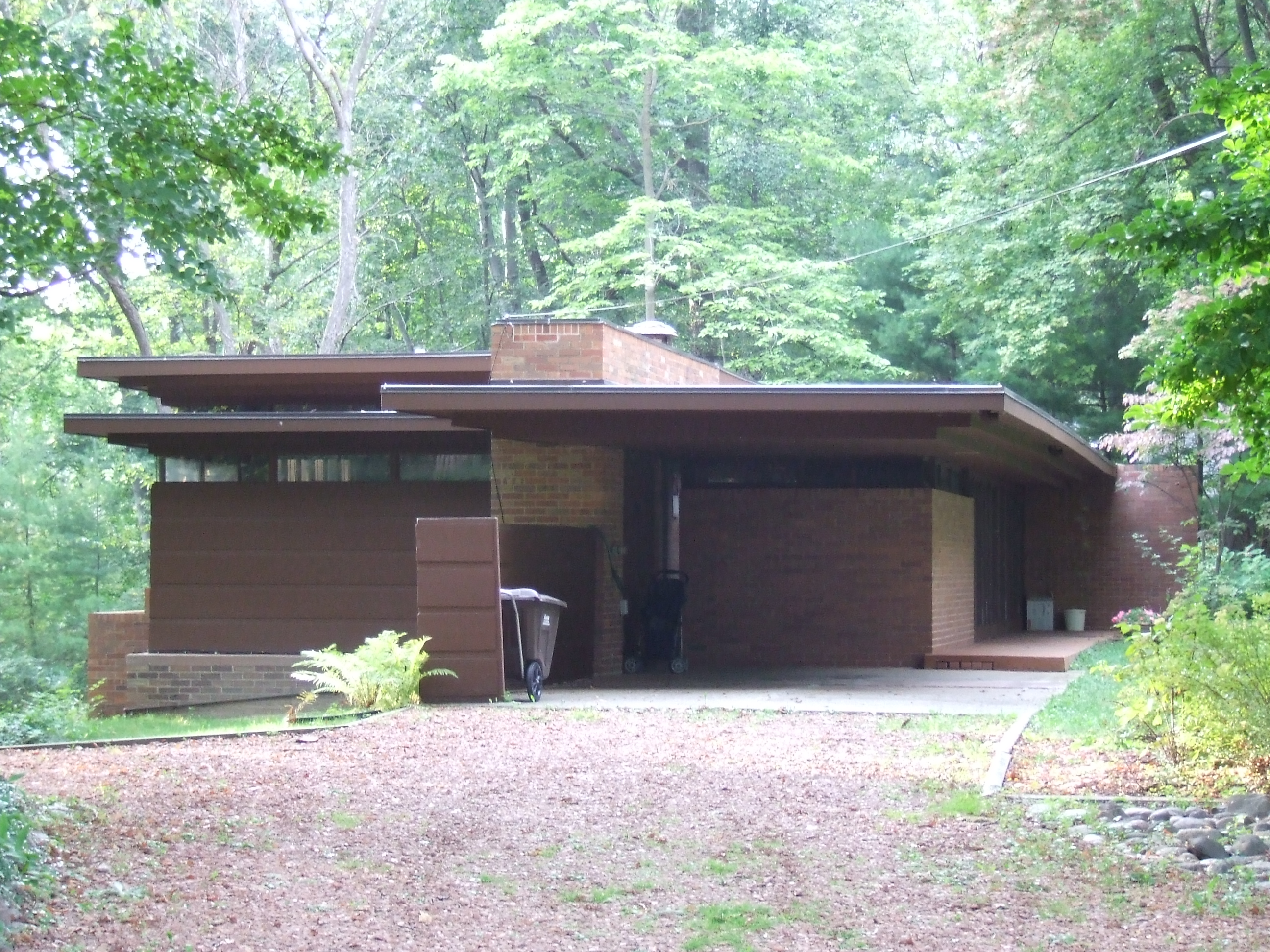

- Location within Michigan Location within the United States
- Interactive map showing the Goetsch–Winckler House
- Location: 2410 Hulett Road; Okemos, Michigan
- Coordinates: 42°42′29″N 84°26′21″W
- Built: 1940
- Architect: Frank Lloyd Wright
- Architectural style: Usonian
- NRHP reference No.: 95001423
- Added to NRHP: December 13, 1995

The Goetsch–Winckler House is a single-family home at 2410 Hulett Road in Okemos, Michigan, United States. Designed by the architect Frank Lloyd Wright for the art professors Alma Goetsch and Kathrine Winckler, it was completed in 1940. The house, an early example of Wright's Usonian homes, is a single-story structure laid out in a straight line and oriented west-northwest to east-southeast. The Goetsch–Winckler House is listed on the National Register of Historic Places.

The massing is composed of several offset rectangular spaces accessed by a carport to the southeast. The facade is made of brick, along with boards and battens. There are also bands of clerestory windows at the tops of the facade, in addition to full-height French doors and casement windows. The house is topped by two levels of overhanging flat roofs with protruding eaves. The interior, spanning no more than 1,400 square feet (130 m^{2}), is centered around an open plan living–dining room. There are two bedrooms and a bathroom to the northwest, a kitchen to the southeast, and a small cellar. In addition, the house has built-in furniture designed by Wright, as well as redwood and brick walls, plywood ceilings, concrete floors, and fir trim. Outside the western corner of the house is a lanai.

In 1938, several Michigan State University professors formed a co-op and bought a 40-acre (16 ha) tract in Okemos, where they intended to develop a community called Usonia II. Wright designed houses for each member of the co-op, including a single house for Goetsch and Winckler, but the co-op plans failed when the members could not obtain financing. The women bought another site in Okemos in early 1940 and hired Wright to construct his design for them on the new site. After the house was finished, Goetsch and Winckler expressed satisfaction at the house's design and often hosted events there. The women moved to Arkansas in 1965, and the house was resold multiple times afterward, falling into disrepair. The Seidman family bought the house in 2007 and restored it. Nathan Meyer bought the house in 2023, and he opened the house to the public for Airbnb bookings and limited tours the next year.

== Description ==
The Goetsch–Winckler House occupies the central portion of a triangular, 1.7-acre (0.69 ha) site at 2410 Hulett Road in Okemos, Michigan, United States. One of Wright's earliest Usonian homes, the Goetsch–Winckler House was designed for Alma Goetsch and Kathrine Winckler, two art professors who worked at Michigan State University. It is one of four buildings that Frank Lloyd Wright designed near Lansing, Michigan. (Note: The others were built for Erling Brauner in 1948, James Edwards in 1949, and Donald Schaberg in 1958.) The house retains most of its original design, with some minor changes over the years.

The house is an "in-line Usonian"—literally a house built in a straight line. This layout is similar to "L"- or "T"-shaped Usonian designs like the Herbert and Katherine Jacobs First House, but they lack an additional wing. The layout was necessitated by the fact that the house sits on a ridge. The house is oriented roughly west-northwest to east-southeast, since the site slopes slightly upward to the northeast and more sharply downward to the southwest. The access driveway, made of crushed stone, leads to a carport on the southeastern side of the house. Shrubbery and a parking area abut the building to the southwest, while a lawn with flowers on its perimeter abuts it to the northwest. The house is surrounded by trees except near its driveway, obscuring the views of neighboring low-rise houses.

=== Exterior ===
The structure is one story tall; it sits on a concrete slab and, like other Usonian houses, has no full basement. The massing is composed of several offset rectangular massings. The living–dining and kitchen spaces are located in the center of the building, with the carport to the southeast and the bedroom wing to the northwest. Outside the western corner of the building is a lanai, or open-air veranda. The lanai occupies a corner between the house's living–dining and bedroom wings and is surrounded by a board-and-batten parapet. Originally paved in grass, the lanai was subsequently remodeled with a concrete pavement composed of 4-by-4-foot (1.2 m × 1.2 m) squares.

==== Facade ====
The outer walls are generally made of brick. On some parts of the facade, the brick walls are clad with horizontally arranged redwood boards, which are separated by sunken battens. When the house was built, the boards were left unpainted so they could be exposed to the elements, but they had been painted in a putty color by the 1990s. There are bands of clerestory windows at the tops of the facade, which were intended to prevent pockets of air from accumulating on the rooms' ceilings. These decorative features were all intended to emphasize the horizontal orientation of the facade.

The southeast elevation of the facade includes the carport, which does not have any windows; the carport wall wraps around the southern corner of the facade. At the eastern corner of the house is a chimney made of red brick, as well as a kitchen wall made of the same material. The primary elevation of the facade is to the northeast, where a walkway from the carport runs along the facade, connecting with a French door to the living–dining room. The walkway, a continuation of the house's concrete-slab foundation, ends at a brick parapet next to the French door. The northern sections of the house's northeast and northwest elevations have a board-and-batten facade, which adjoins one of the bedrooms.

The western corner of the facade, adjoining the lanai, is composed of a solid wall flanked by perforated wall sections. Each perforated wall section consists of battens but lacks the corresponding boards. There are French doors leading to the lanai from both the living–dining room and bedrooms. The southwest elevation has several vertical casement windows abutting the living room, which face a brick planter. To support the concrete foundation slab, there are several horizontal brick courses beneath the southern elevation of the house.

==== Roof ====
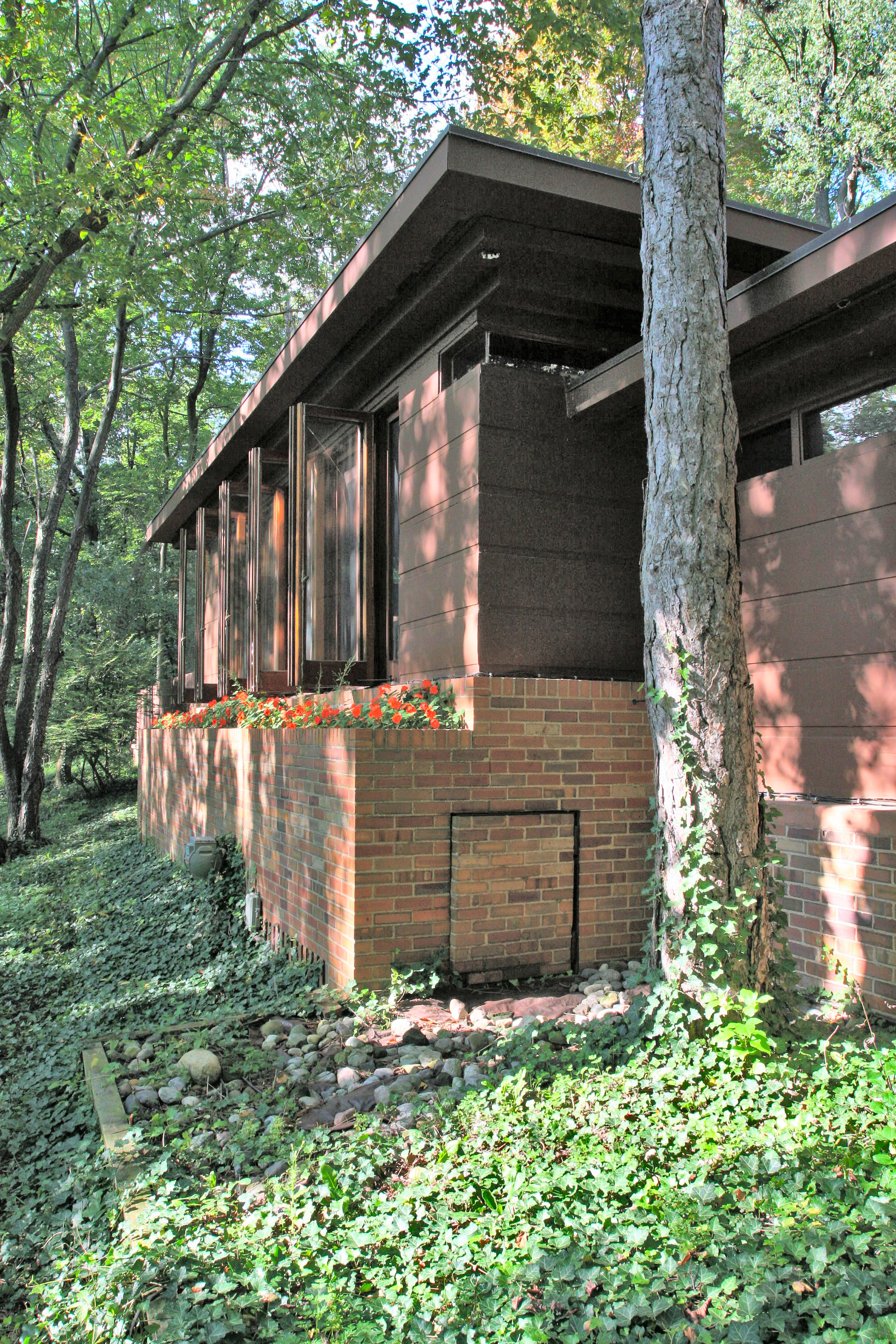
Exterior of the house as seen from the southeast corner

The house is topped by two levels of overhanging flat roofs with protruding eaves; the soffits, or bottom surfaces of the eaves, are made of plywood. The bedroom, kitchen, and entrance areas have a lower roof, while the living–dining room has a higher roof. The roof is made of a system of overlapping joists measuring 2 by 4 inches (51 by 102 mm) across. The house's carport is covered by a cantilevered canopy extending above the driveway, which extends 10 feet (3.0 m) beyond the nearest wall. When the house was built, a trellis was cantilevered above the lanai along the building's southwest elevation, but this trellis has since been removed. In addition, the flat roofs were originally ineffective in draining water, prompting later owners to give it a slight pitch, or slope.

=== Interior ===
The house is cited as having a floor area of 1,350 square feet (125 m^{2}) or approximately 1,400 square feet (130 m^{2}). In general, the interiors consist of redwood wall planks and concrete floors, though the house also has fir trim and red-brick fireplace walls. The interior partition walls are made of board-and-batten siding, which is laid horizontally and is composed of plywood sheets with tarpaper between them. The floor is made of concrete and is divided into a grid of 4-by-4-foot (1.2 m × 1.2 m) squares. The house is heated by a radiant heating system, which consists of hot-water pipes embedded into the floor slab; the radiant-heating system eliminated the need for radiators. There is a small cellar under the living room, which contains the boiler room and some storage space. The ceiling is clad in oiled plywood and has indirect lighting fixtures. The original plans called for the ceilings to be clad in redwood, but the general contractor, Harold Turner, swapped out the materials during construction.

Wright installed built-in furniture throughout the rooms to make the building appear larger than it actually was. The built-in furniture includes the dining table, a bar, a desk and bookcase in the workspace, and storage spaces. Some of the furniture that Wright designed for the house was not built, including panels for the clerestory, built-in beds, and all except two of the chairs that he designed for the house's studio. Goetsch designed the original curtains for the house. The house's floors are painted in red, while the original textiles were decorated in an earthen color palette.

==== Living–dining room and kitchen ====
At the center of the house is an open plan living–dining room, which contains a dining niche, a foyer, and an art-studio space; the different spaces are delineated by built-in furniture and by changes in the ceiling's height. The room is illuminated by both clerestory windows and casement windows. The southwestern side of the living–dining room has an artists' studio that receives natural light from the large casement windows, which overlook the ravine. The room's other three sides have clerestory windows only at the top of the walls. The living–dining room has a fireplace without a mantelpiece or hearth, and there is a modular dining table and a built-in bench next to it. The dining table protrudes into the living–dining room, which is arranged in a "Z" shape around the table.

Behind the fireplace's chimney is a workspace, which has a low ceiling and occupies an alcove on the living room's southeastern wall. The workspace is bounded by built-in furniture on the southwest and southeast, the chimney on the northeast, and the rest of the living room on the northwest. This space is illuminated by clerestory windows. Another alcove to the northeast was used to store paintings.

The kitchen is at the eastern corner of the house, next to the living room's workspace and separated from the living room by the fireplace. It is surrounded by the house's brick exterior walls and the brick chimney and has a ceiling 7 feet (2.1 m) high. The space receives natural light from clerestory windows atop the walls, in addition to two ceiling skylights. There is a countertop with a stove and sink along the exterior walls, as well as a niche for a refrigerator within the chimney wall. A 4-foot-long (1.2 m) wall separates the kitchen from the foyer and is topped by a clerestory window.

==== Bedrooms and bathroom ====
Connecting the living room to the bedrooms is a hallway, which has windows and French doors on its northern wall, as well as closets on the southern wall. The bathroom and the two bedrooms are at the northwest end of the house. The bathroom separates the two bedrooms and has pink hardware, board-and-batten walls, built-in storage areas, and a window facing the lanai. The bedrooms themselves open onto the lanai. The southeast bedroom (next to the living room) is smaller and was built for Alma Goetsch, while the northwest bedroom was built for Kathrine Winckler and has larger, and more numerous, windows. There are built-in storage areas in both rooms and a built-in table in the northwest bedroom. These spaces also have relatively low ceilings of 7 feet (2.1 m).

== History ==
Frank Lloyd Wright mostly designed houses for wealthy clients until the 1930s, when he also began to design lower-cost Usonian houses for middle-class families. In general, his Usonian houses tended to have open plans, geometric floor grids, in-floor heating, and a carport, and they lacked a garage or basement. Wright's first-ever Usonian house design had been the Jacobs First House in Madison, Wisconsin, completed in 1937. Prior to the American entry into World War II, Wright had designed numerous other houses around the U.S., including the Goetsch–Winckler House. (Note: According to the journalist Brendan Gill, these included the Affleck, Baird, Christie, Lloyd Lewis, Pauson, Pew, Pope–Leighey, Rosenbaum, Schwartz, Sondern, and Sturges houses.)

=== Development ===
==== Original plans ====
In 1938, several professors from Michigan State University (MSU) in East Lansing, Michigan, formed a food co-op. (Note: Sergeant 1984, p. 78, writes that the co-op was composed of seven professors. Other sources say that there were eight professors, but because Goetsch and Winckler shared a house, only seven designs were created. Bandes 1990, p. 4, writes that the co-op originally consisted of six professors, but that two of the original professors dropped out and were replaced by four new professors.) They bought a 40-acre (16 ha) tract of land in neighboring Okemos, facing Herron Creek; this site was selected because it was near the MSU campus but also had a rural character. Two of the co-op's members, Alma Goetsch and Kathrine Winckler, were art professors who had known each other since the late 1920s. They lived together because, at the time, unmarried women rarely lived alone and seldom had enough money to build their own houses. Both women had wanted Wright to design them a house for several years, but the completion of the Jacobs First House had given them hope that "heaven was within our reach". Another co-op member, Sidney Newman, reached out to Wright, who agreed to design the structures and visited the Okemos site in October 1938. Goetsch and Winckler told the architect: "We are both somewhat under forty years old, hale, hearty, energetic, much engrossed in our work [...] and united in a common desire to help you build a house for us."

Wright had completed seven designs by mid-1939, at which point some of the original professors in the co-op had dropped out and been replaced by others. Wright's concept, derived from the Broadacre City plan, was to be known as Herron Acres or Usonia II. (Note: According to Sergeant 1984, p. 78, Wright himself made contradictory comments about the development's name. He labeled the development as "Usonia I" in planning drawings but referred to it as "Usonia II" in a 1939 speech.) The community was to consist of seven houses, each of which would have been located on a U-shaped road and set back behind a garden. Each house would have had its own circular tract. The cottages and the caretaker's residence would have surrounded a communal farm with a pond, orchard, and fields. Though each house also had distinct designs to meet each co-op member's needs, they shared features such as flat roofs, accentuated horizontal lines, and a simple massing. About 17 acres (6.9 ha) of the site would have been used by the co-op, while the rest would be sold in the future. Harold Turner agreed in August 1939 to construct the houses.

Most of the professors had believed that they could spend $5,500 to $6,000 on their respective residences. The co-op's members were unable to obtain bank loans due to the non-standard design, even though they had contacted more than 50 financial institutions. In addition, the Federal Housing Administration (FHA) was unwilling to give a loan for the project, citing the riskiness of its unconventional design. FHA officials refused to change their mind even after Wright personally went to Washington, D.C., in an attempt to convince FHA officials. Ultimately, the project was canceled in April 1940, and only the Goetsch–Winckler House was initially built. After World War II, Wright designed separate houses for several other co-op members, although the only design that was built was for Erling P. Brauner in Okemos. In addition, Wright went on to develop Usonian communes such as Parkwyn Village, Galesburg Country Homes, and the Pleasantville Usonian district. Wright reused the Usonia co-op's circular land-lot layout when he designed the Pleasantville district in the late 1940s.

==== New site ====
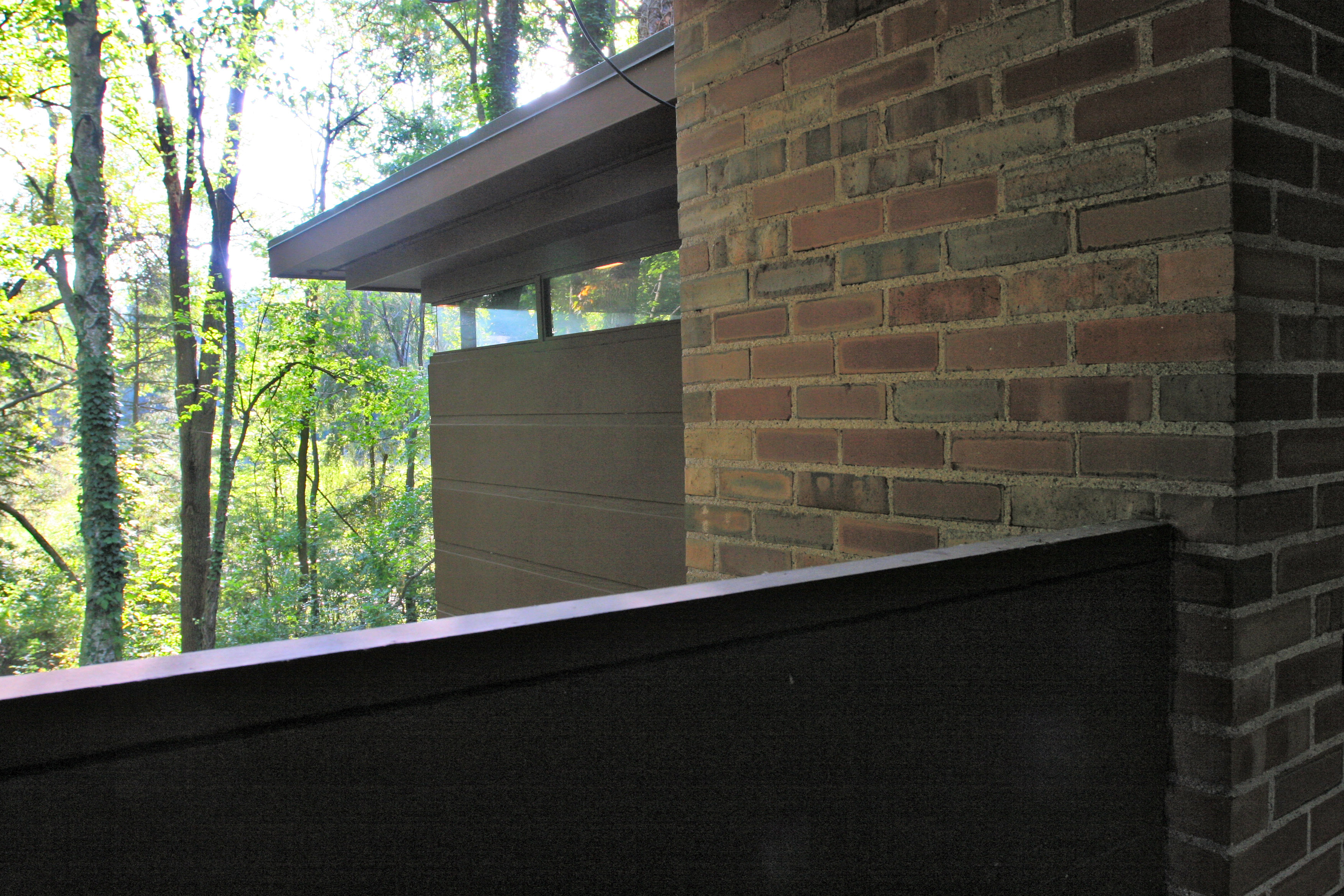
View of the house's upper facade and roofs

Goetsch and Winckler decided to acquire a different site, as they felt that the Usonia II site was too close to a landfill and a feeding trough. They hired Wright to construct his design for them on the new site. Both women wrote to Wright, detailing what they wanted in the design. Winckler wanted a well-illuminated, wide-open room, saying that she "resented the little holes in the walls that people call windows". By contrast, Goetsch wanted a "feeling of security" in her own bedroom because, being a lifelong city resident, she was nervous about moving to the countryside. Some elements of the design were revised to reflect these comments; for example, the house's lanai was added to give Goetsch the secure feeling she wanted, while Winckler's bedroom incorporates many large windows. Winckler wanted the house to be large enough to entertain visitors, since their existing apartment was too small for that purpose.

Goetsch and Winckler had set aside $6,600 for the house's development, pledging Winckler's mother's house as collateral for a construction loan. At the time, they earned $2,000 a year, not enough for them to fund the house on their own. Turner began building the house in June 1940. He modified the design slightly in response to Goetsch's and Winckler's requests, adding a cellar and substituting the type of wood used on the ceiling. Wright, who had refused to modify the house for his clients, denounced Turner's changes in a letter to Goetsch and Winckler, who responded that the original design was still intact. The house was finished in November 1940. It had cost $6,594.73, being just barely under budget.

=== Usage ===
==== Goetsch and Winckler ownership ====
When the house was complete, Goetsch and Winkler often invited visitors, hosting frequent social gatherings such as parties and debates. For instance, the women invited visitors to discuss election returns and talk about politics on Election Days. The house's guests over the years included the architect Buckminster Fuller and the Wright family, in addition to groups such as a creative-arts group of the American Association of University Women. The two women liked Wright's design enough that they asked him to design them another bedroom in 1942; however, the bedroom was not built because it was too close to the property line.

Several years after the house was finished, Winckler and Goetsch told the Lansing State Journal that they "haven't found a thing we'd want changed". Nonetheless, after World War II (less than a decade after the original house's completion), they asked Wright to design them another home several miles away, due to the growth of the Lansing suburbs near the original house. The second home, which took two years to design, would have contained additional storage space, a dedicated studio room, two bathrooms, and a pool. This turned out to be too expensive for Goetsch and Winckler, who did not carry out the plans. They nonetheless continued to like the house's design, saying in 1963 that "when you put your hopes for a plan of a house into the hands of a real architect, he knows more about what you need than you do". The women lived in Okemos until they both retired in 1965. They moved to Fayetteville, Arkansas, where they hired E. Fay Jones to design them a house on a hill overlooking downtown Fayetteville.

==== Later owners ====
After Goetsch and Winckler moved out, the house was resold multiple times. Subsequent owners replaced the windows and strengthened the cantilevered carport canopy. By 1990, the house was owned by Elizabeth Halsted, who wished to sell the house due to its increasing maintenance issues. These problems included peeling varnish, leaks in the radiant-heating system's pipes, and poor drainage due to the flat roofs. The Goetsch–Winckler House was added to the National Register of Historic Places in 1995. The designer Dorian Lapadura briefly lived there that year. By 2001, the Frank Lloyd Wright Building Conservancy had received several complaints that the house was in disrepair, and the leaking roof was covered with a tarp. Members of the conservancy spent hundreds of hours discussing the house's preservation. The conservancy then bought the house two days before a foreclosure auction was to occur, taking out money from a Revolving Loan Fund. The conservancy then owned the house for 18 months, until 2002, and established a preservation easement requiring future owners to retain the house's original design and open it to the public four days a year.

Audrey and Dan Seidman bought the house in 2007, though they primarily lived in Southern California, where Dan worked as a university admissions recruiter for MSU. The Seidmans both were interested in architecture, and Dan recalled that he had decided to buy the house after seeing a real estate listing for it. Audrey later said that the house was a "livable house for today" but could comfortably accommodate only two people. In the 13 years after they acquired the house, the Seidman family renovated it. The project included replacing damaged portions of the walls and ceilings, repairing broken decorations, and patching cracks in the concrete. Additionally, the electrical wiring and the heating system were upgraded. In 2020, the Seidman family placed the Goetsch–Winckler House for sale, saying that they had finished restoring the building and wanted to conserve another structure.

Nathan Meyer, a longtime fan of Wright's work, bought the house with his family in December 2023. After purchasing the building, Meyer began restoring it. The work involved restoring the bathroom's original appearance, fixing the screen doors, and removing paint from the facade. The Meyer family did not live there full time, citing issues such as poor ventilation, low hot-water pressure, and a lack of air conditioning. The Meyers instead used the Goetsch–Winckler House as a pied-à-terre, later opening the house to visitors in late 2024. The Meyers initially gave private tours to visitors who contacted them through Instagram. They began renting out the house on Airbnb as a short-term rental that October.

== Impact ==
Brendan Gill wrote in 1987 that the house "is thought by many architectural historians to be the most elegant of all the Usonian houses", while Leland M. Roth said that "seldom in his larger works [...] did Wright achieve greater coherence or authority". The Lansing State Journal said in 1990 that the house "seems all the more remarkable after 50 years". The writer John Sergeant compared the house's construction materials, simple design, and horizontally-arranged decorative elements to the architecture of International Style architects such as Ludwig Mies van der Rohe. Diane Tepfer wrote for Woman's Art Journal that the house's design reflected the "modernist love of the machine", calling the Goetsch–Winckler House an "important work of modern architecture". After the house was opened for overnight stays, a writer for Condé Nast Traveler wrote that it "provided a unique window into classic Americana", while Elle Decor described it as "a diminutive example of Wright’s Usonian designs", with many extant original decorations.

When the house was completed, it was included in several publications about modern houses. Chauncey L. Griggs commissioned Wright to design him a house in Tacoma, Washington, after viewing a photograph of the Goetsch–Winckler House in one such publication. The house was featured in a 1949 photography exhibit of modern houses at MSU (then known as Michigan State College). In addition, MSU's Kresge Art Museum hosted an exhibit about the house in 1990, and the exhibit's curator Susan Bandes published a book about the house the next year.

== See also ==
- List of Frank Lloyd Wright works
- National Register of Historic Places listings in Ingham County, Michigan
- Donald Schaberg House, designed by Wright in Okemos
- Suntop Homes, designed by Wright in Ardmore, Pennsylvania
