= Parkwyn Village =

Planned community in Kalamazoo, Michigan

- U.S. National Register of Historic Places
- U.S. Historic district
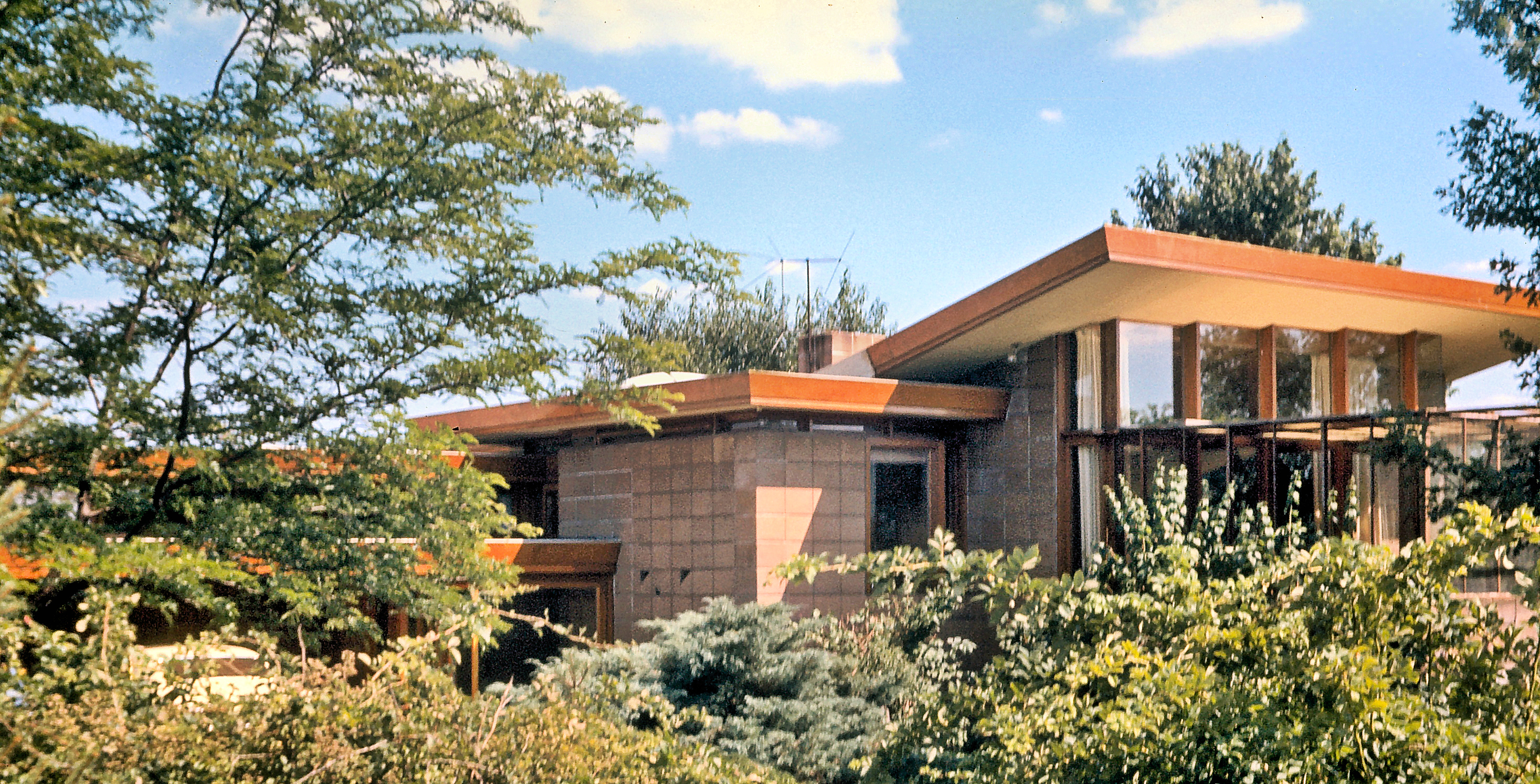
- Robert and Rae Levin House

- Location within Michigan Location within the United States
- Interactive map
- Location: Winchell and Lorraine Aves.; Parkwyn and Taliesin Drs., Kalamazoo, Michigan
- Coordinates: 42°15′51″N 85°37′51″W
- NRHP reference No.: 100007690
- Added to NRHP: April 29, 2022

Parkwyn Village is a planned community of Usonian houses located along Winchell and Lorraine Avenues and Parkwyn and Taliesin Drives, in Kalamazoo, Michigan. It was listed on the National Register of Historic Places in 2022. Four houses in the community were designed by Frank Lloyd Wright: The Robert and Rae Levin House, the Eric and Margaret Ann (Davis) Brown House, the Ward McCartney House, and the Robert D. Winn House.

== History ==
In the early 1940s, a group of employees from the Upjohn Company began to meet and plan for a new cooperative community in Kalamazoo. They were looking for a design that was inexpensive yet practical, and a community where decisions were made equally. The group began to search for land and interview architects. After interviewing architects they asked for their opinion as to what architect would be the best for the job, and they all said Frank Lloyd Wright, but that he would never agree to work with them.

The group contacted Wright between 1946 and 1947 requesting his involvement in their community. By phone the group explained their ideas and were invited to Taliesin to explain their ideas more thoroughly. Part of the group went to present their ideas. Even though it was a small task during this period of his career, Wright accepted the job.

After Wright agreed to work with them, they began recruiting other families to become part of their community. Potential families had to attend a Parkwyn Association meeting before they could buy land within the community. The association was not allowed to discriminate against race, religion, or color. By November 1948 there were 26 families.

The group then found 72 acres (290,000 m^{2}) of land in Galesburg, ten miles (16 km) away from Kalamazoo. Some wanted to live there, but others wanted to live closer to town. Soon the group split into two, those who wanted to live closer to the city, and those who wanted to live in Galesburg, often called "The Acres" or "Galesburg Country Homes". The families wanting to live closer to town found 47 acres (190,000 m^{2}) and called their community "Parkwyn Village". Although the two groups were not living in the same location, they worked together to promote both communities.

During 1947 both plats were designed, and sent to the Federal Housing Administration for approval. Wright planned circular lots for Parkwyn Village so there would be shared space between each house, but later changed them to rectangles after having the lots denied by the FHA for financing. Even though technically the area between each house was not shared, the owners planted trees and flowers between the properties to honor the original plans.

== Description ==
The plan included space for community owned property. That area included an outdoor grill, picnic tables, swings, teeter-totters, tennis courts, an ice-skating rink, a baseball diamond, swimming pool, and a community center. Some of these amenities were forgotten and never completed.

Wright also planned for a circular road pattern to build a stronger sense of community, and underground utilities so there would be no curbs, gutters, sewers, or above ground telephone wires.

== Gallery ==
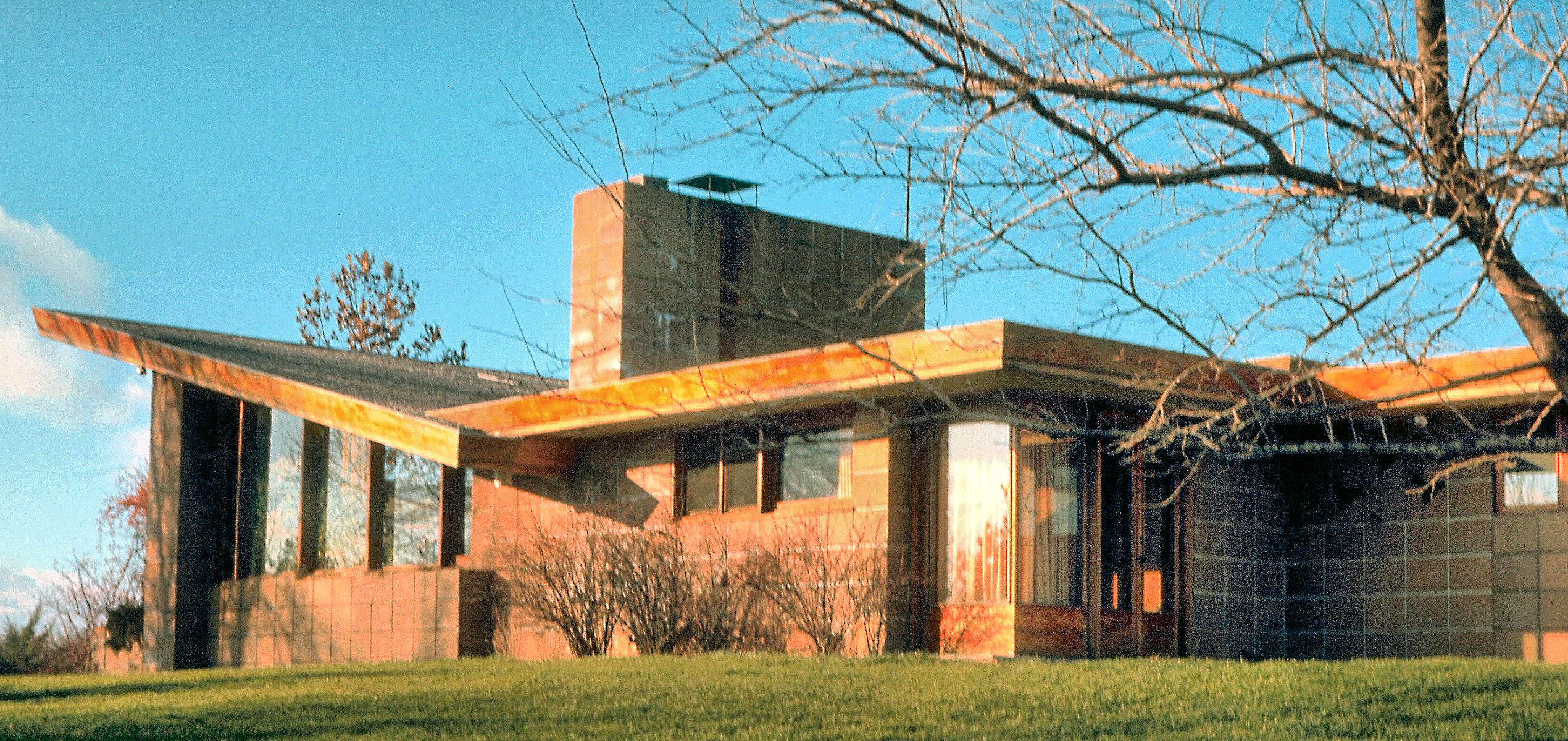
Robert and Rae Levin House

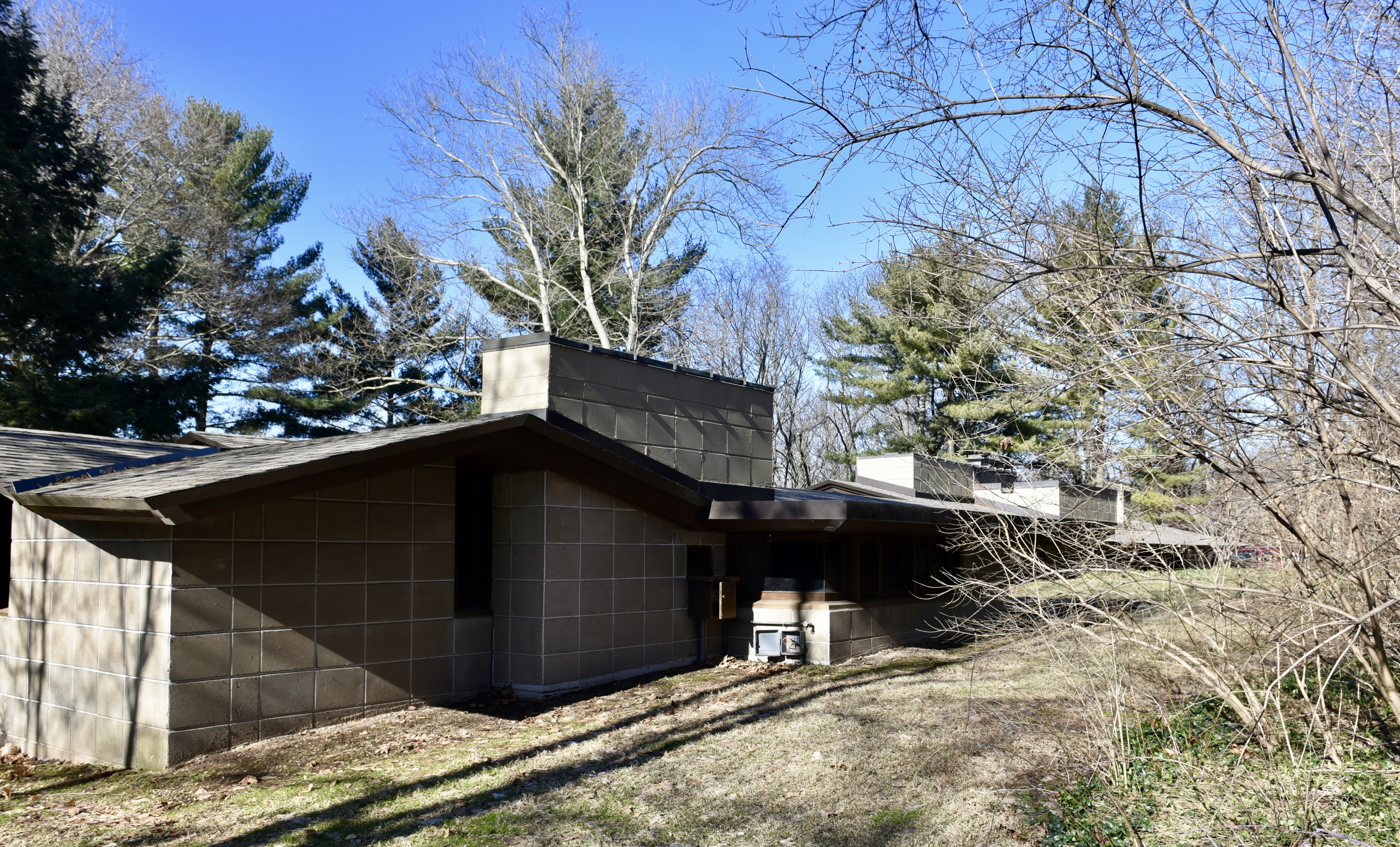
Eric and Margaret Ann (Davis) Brown House

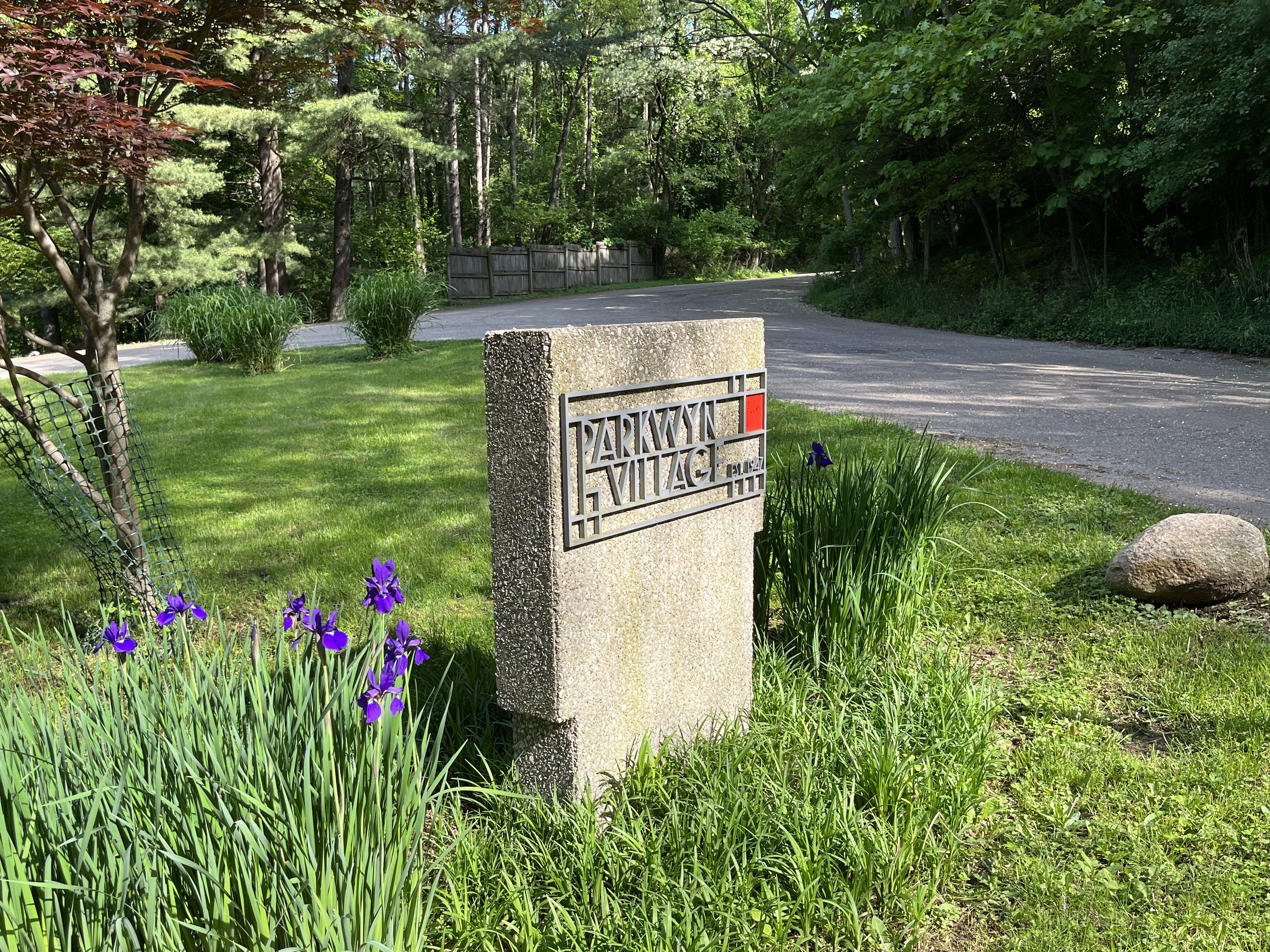
Village entrance sign

== See also ==
- Frank Lloyd Wright buildings
- Frank Lloyd Wright Building Conservancy
- List of Frank Lloyd Wright works by date
- List of Frank Lloyd Wright works by location
- Broadacre City
- Usonia
