= Melvyn Maxwell and Sara Stein Smith House =

House in Bloomfield, Michigan

- Melvyn Maxwell Smith and Sara Stein Smith House
- U.S. National Register of Historic Places
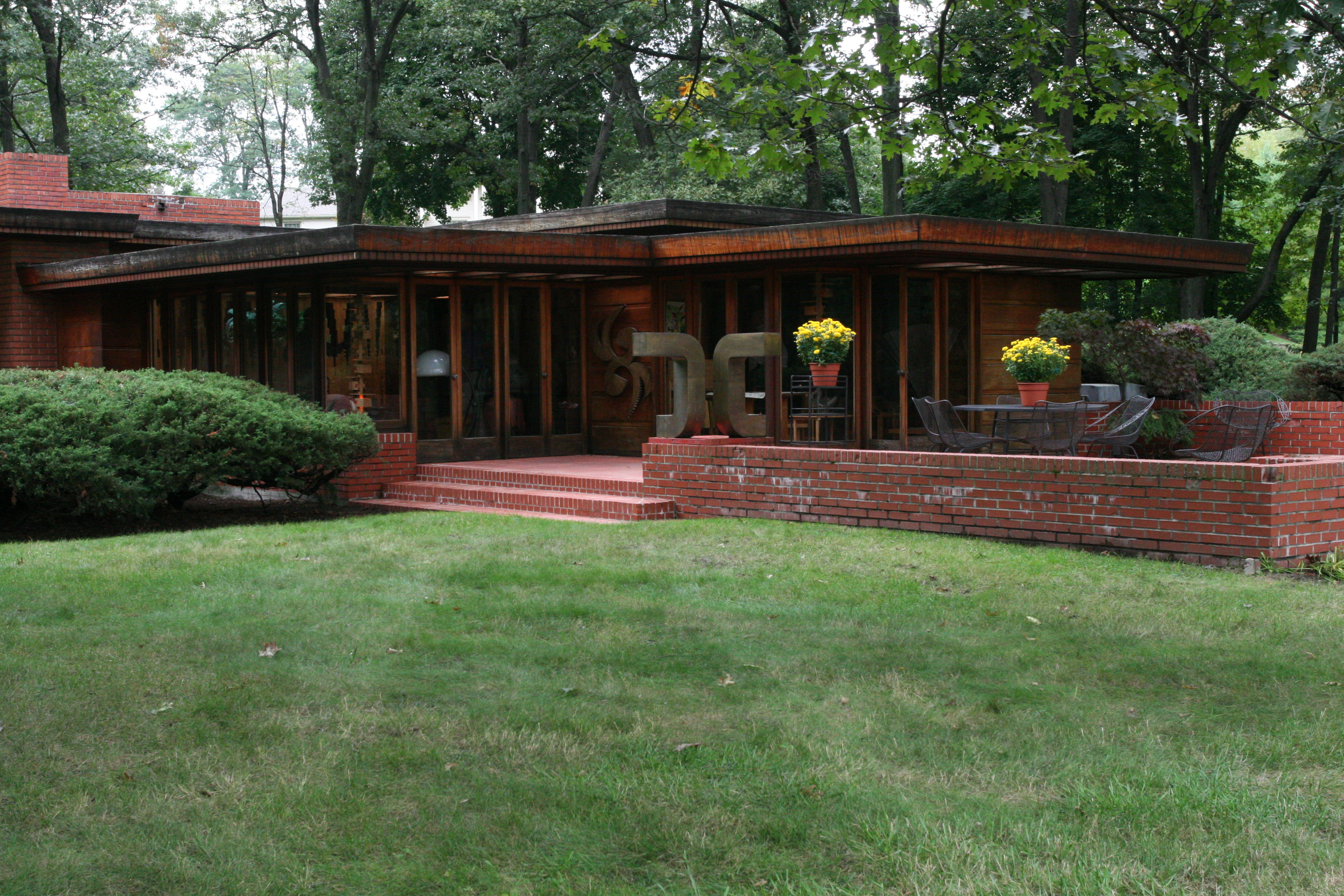

- Location within Michigan
- Interactive map
- Location: Bloomfield Hills, Michigan
- Coordinates: 42°33′53.89″N 83°16′16.65″W
- Built: 1949-1950
- Architect: Frank Lloyd Wright
- Architectural style: Usonian
- NRHP reference No.: 97000283
- Added to NRHP: 03/28/1997

The Melvyn Maxwell Smith and Sara Stein Smith House, also known as MyHaven, is a Usonian home that was designed by Frank Lloyd Wright and constructed in Bloomfield Hills, Michigan, in 1949 and 1950. The owners were two public school teachers living on a tight budget. The 1957 landscape design is by Thomas Dolliver Church. The home is now on the National Register of Historic Places.

== Owners ==
Melvyn Maxwell Smith was the son of Lithuanian Jewish immigrants whose original surname was Smiefsky. He became a grade school teacher, and later a high school English teacher. While attending an art history class at Wayne State University as a graduate student in 1939, he was inspired by a presentation on Wright's famous Fallingwater house, and, on the spot, announced his intention to build a house designed by Wright himself.

Sara Stein, born in 1907 in South Fork, Pennsylvania was the daughter of Lithuanian Jewish immigrants. She later became a Christian Scientist. She was also a school teacher.

Sara Stein embraced Smith's vision of a Wright designed home, and the couple married on March 21, 1940. They spent their careers as teachers in the Detroit Public Schools. Melvyn Smith died in 1984 and Sara Smith died in 2005.

The home, given by the Towbes Foundation in December 2017, is now owned by the Cranbrook Educational Community. Tours are available May through October through the Cranbrook Center for Collections and Research website.

== Design ==
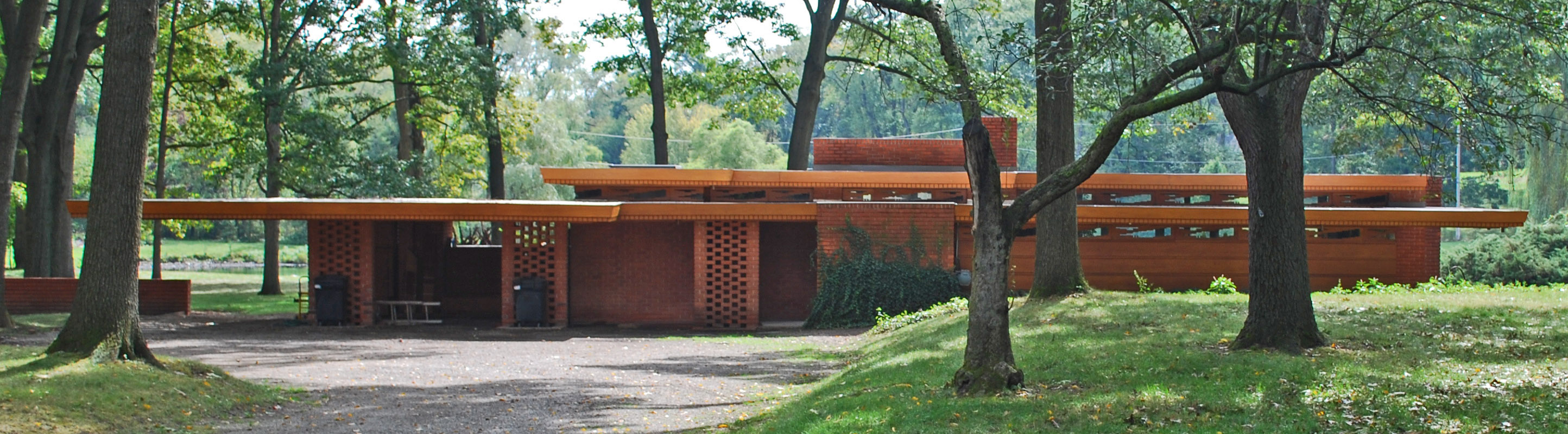
Melvyn Maxwell and Sara Stein Smith House

In the summer of 1941, the Smiths traveled to Taliesin, Wright's studio near Spring Green, Wisconsin. There, they met with Wright, who agreed to design a home for them with an initial budget of approximately $9,000.

World War II delayed the project. Melvyn Maxwell Smith was drafted into the Army in February 1942, and served until late in 1945.

In the summer of 1946, the Smiths purchased 3.3 acres of hilly, wooded land in Bloomfield Hills for $3,600, which represented their entire savings at that time. They again contacted Wright, and visited with him over the Labor Day weekend of 1946. After several delays, they received the preliminary house plans from Wright in March 1947. The house was to be 1600 square feet and featured radiant heating through hot water pipes installed under the floor slab. Like other Wright Usonian home designs, the house also relied on passive solar energy. The Smiths collaborated with Wright on a number of revisions to the house plans, and developed a close rapport with the architect during the process. Wright agreed to incorporate all of the changes they proposed, and the design was finalized in September 1949. Architect William Wesley Peters, who served as president of the Frank Lloyd Wright Foundation, wrote that Wright "never had clients who were greater in the sense of love and appreciation than Melvyn Maxwell and Sara Smith. It was a two-way road because the more that came back to Frank Lloyd Wright, the more he gave, so it was a double gain."

== Construction ==
At Wright's advice, Melvyn Maxwell Smith decided to act as his own general contractor, so that he could save money and maintain the quality standards he expected. He recruited skilled workers who wanted to work on a home designed by Wright so much that they would accept lower pay than usual. Suppliers of building materials also provided goods, such as 14,000 board feet of red tidewater cypress lumber at discounted prices because of their wish to be involved with a Wright project. As a young man, before his eventual career as a shopping center developer, A. Alfred Taubman provided all of the windows at a deep discount because he considered the house a "fantastic structure".

During the construction period in 1949 and 1950, the Smiths' combined income was $280 per month. They could only spend what they had saved, so building was slowed by the acquisition of the necessary funds, Sara working through the summer often at Cranbrook Theater summer camps, while Smith supervised the building. They had to "scrimp and save in myriad ways".

They moved into the house in May 1950, with minimal appointments. One year later, they received as a housewarming gift from brother-in-law Irving Goldberg: a maple dining table with eight maple chairs, two coffee tables and six hassocks, all designed by Frank Lloyd Wright as part of the house plans and crafted by the Goldberg company's master carpenters.

== Visits by Frank Lloyd Wright ==
Although construction was supervised mostly at a distance by one of Wright's subordinates, John H. "Jack" Howe, Wright visited the house himself in 1951, and called it "my little gem". He visited the house again in 1953 and 1957.

== Landscaping and art collection ==
In 1957 Melvyn Smith met with landscape architect Thomas Dolliver Church, who visited the home and stayed for a spaghetti dinner prepared by Sara Smith. Church spent the night as their guest, and the following morning produced a landscape plan on the spot for a nominal fee.

The home is located near the Cranbrook Educational Community, and over the years, the Smiths built an extensive art collection, where the majority of works were by artists associated with Cranbrook. Among them are a massive chest by Paul R. Evans, a gazelle sculpture by Marshall Fredericks, and works by many other artists, exterior sculptures by Mike Calligan, weavings by Urban Jupena, interior sculptures by James Messana, and a sculpted bust of Melvyn Maxwell Smith by Robert Schefman. Cranbrook president Roy Slade praised the home as exemplifying "the integration of art, architecture and nature". Architectural photographer Balthazar Korab produced a widely reproduced image of Calligan's "Natural Bridge" sculpture with the house as the backdrop. Later, the Smiths collected works by Glen Michaels, including an accordion screen to close off the kitchen from the dining area, and a triptych mosaic installed above the fireplace. The house was modified in 1968 in consultation with Frank Lloyd Wright Foundation architect William Wesley Peters to convert the south terrace into a garden room. The house is now 1,800 square feet (170 m^{2}).

== Significance ==
According to the Michigan State Historic Preservation Office, "the use of strong horizontal roof planes, cantilevers, and the landscape emphasize the integrated relationship of the structure" and they concluded that the house is "a prime example of Frank Lloyd Wright’s Usonian design philosophy for housing the 'common' man."

The National Register of Historic Places described the home's characteristics as including "ingenious building techniques, free flowing interior spaces exploding to the outdoors, as well as an 'organic' relationship to the site" and they concluded that "the home is especially pleasing at night when the spaces take on a festive atmosphere. At night from the exterior, the lights reflect off the large glass walls and mitered glass corners and give the home a crystalline quality."

== See also ==
- National Register of Historic Places listings in Oakland County, Michigan
- List of Frank Lloyd Wright works
