= Donald Schaberg House =

House in Okemos, Michigan

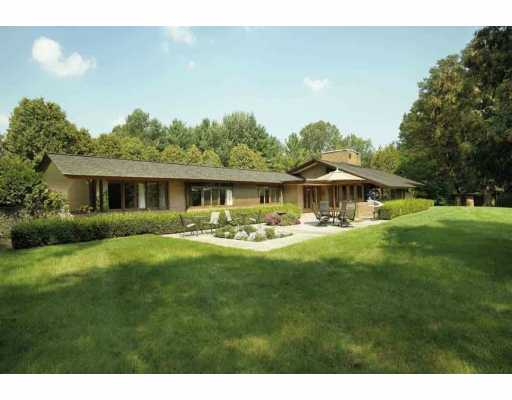

- Location within Michigan
- Interactive map showing the Schaberg House

General information
- Type: House
- Architectural style: Usonian
- Location: Okemos, Michigan
- Coordinates: 42°42′33″N 84°23′20″W
- Construction started: 1958

Design and construction
- Architect: Frank Lloyd Wright

The Schaberg House is a house designed by Frank Lloyd Wright in Okemos, Michigan, United States. Commissioned in 1950 by Donald and Mary Lou Schaberg, the house is an example of Wright's Usonian style.

== History ==
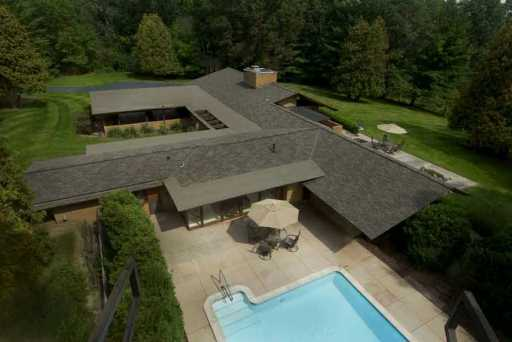
Aerial view.

According to Thomas Heinz in his book "The Vision of Frank Lloyd Wright", Donald Schaberg worked in the lumber industry in Lansing, Michigan. The Schabergs had been friends with the Edwards family before, and when the Edwards commissioned Wright to design them a house (James Edwards House), and the Schabergs liked what they saw, the Schabergs commissioned Wright to design a home for themselves.

Don and Mary Lou Schaberg visited Wright at his home, Taliesin, so that the architect could understand the needs of the young couple better. It took many months and many reminder notes before Wright would send the plans for their new home. But when they came it was worth the wait. As Wright wrote, "your patience will be rewarded this side of heaven".

Wright designed the house in 1950, and the Schabergs built the house in 1957. It was completed in 1958.

The Schabergs commissioned John H. "Jack" Howe, Wright's right-hand man, to design an addition to the house that was finished in 1964. In 1968, Schaberg designed and had built a 40-foot tower adjoining the home. An inground swimming pool (pictured) was built in 1973.

== Wright's other area work ==
- Erling P. Brauner House
- Goetsch–Winckler House
- James Edwards House

== See also ==
- List of Frank Lloyd Wright works
