= Clarence Sondern House =

House in Kansas City, Missouri, US

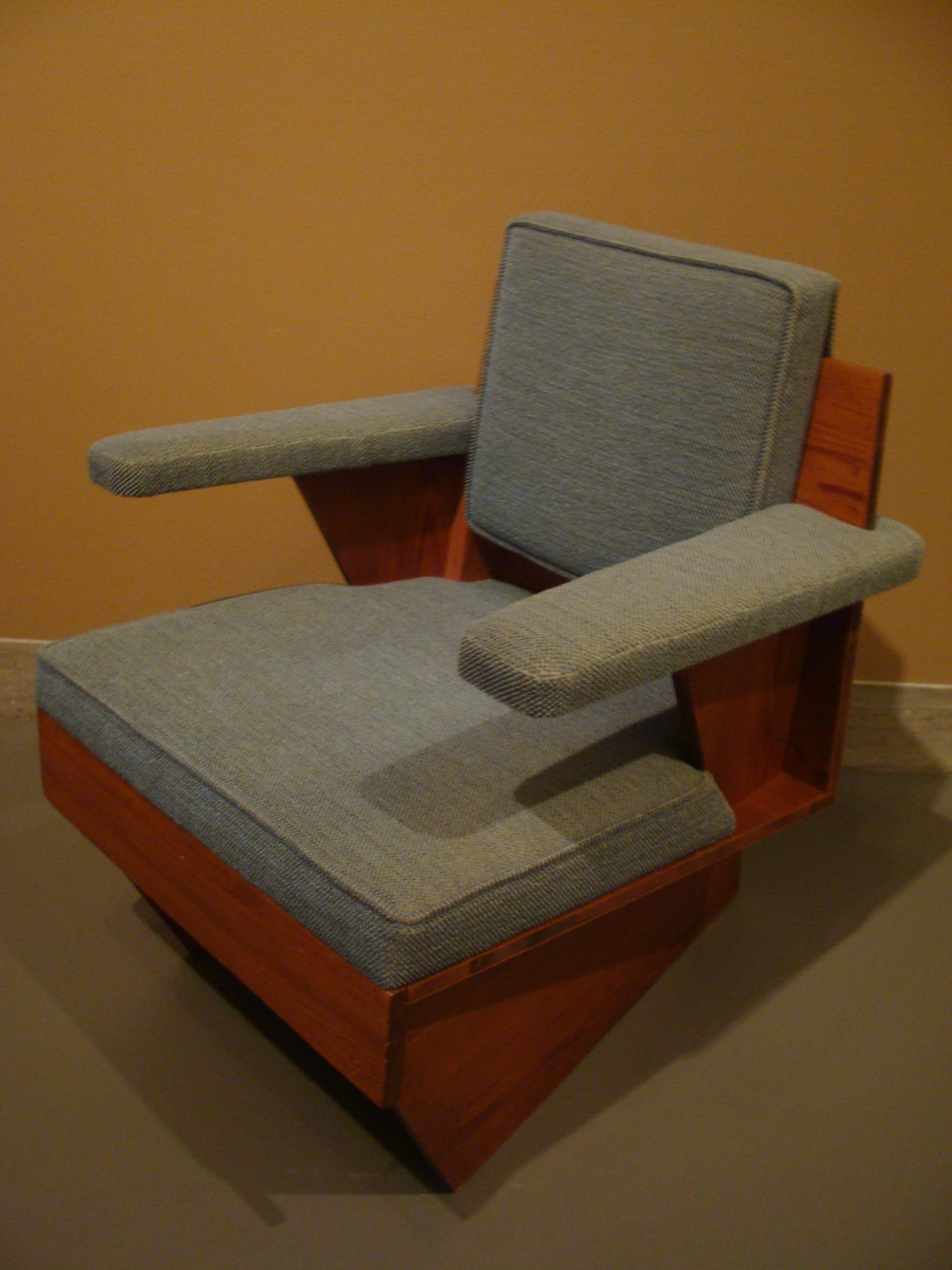
- Armchair designed for the Sondern House, now in the Nelson-Atkins Museum of Art

- Location within Missouri Location within the United States

General information
- Type: House
- Architectural style: Usonian
- Location: Kansas City, Missouri
- Coordinates: 39°03′45″N 94°35′54″W
- Construction started: 1939-1940
- Completed: 1948

Technical details
- Floor area: 2,916 sq ft (270.9 m^{2})

Design and construction
- Architect: Frank Lloyd Wright

The Clarence Sondern House is a historic residence at 3600 Belleview Avenue in the Roanoke neighborhood of Kansas City, Missouri. It is also known as the Sondern-Adler House.

== History ==
Clarence Sondern commissioned Frank Lloyd Wright to design the home in 1939, and it was constructed in 1940. The Sondern House is a single level with a flat roof in Wright's classic Usonian style. Using a 4-foot X 4-foot grid (1.2 m) excised onto concrete floors, its masonry sections provide the support for many walls of glass. There are long overhangs on many portions of the house and a carport for the family's vehicle. This was the first home on which Taliesin Fellowship member John H. "Jack" Howe supervised the construction. The original construction was small in size, at just over 900 square feet (84 m^{2}).

The second owner of the home, Arnold Adler, hired Wright in 1948 to design an addition to the original structure. The addition included a new entry area, additional carports, a large dining room, and a living area with fireplace. An additional bedroom and baths were also added, bringing the total size of the house to 2,916 square feet (270.9 m^{2}). Since the home was built near a hill, the expanded living room was built a few steps down from the rest of the house, allowing for a higher ceiling and clerestory windows. The addition continued the use of tidewater cypress for the exterior and interior woodwork.

The painter Thomas Hart Benton lived in the house just next door to the Sondern House. While working for Sondern, Wright offered to tear down the "rat trap" of a stable at the rear of Benton property and design a good studio for Benton in its place.

The house was sold through "Heritage Auctions" in August 2019 for US$920,000.

== See also ==
- List of Frank Lloyd Wright works
