= John H. Howe (architect) =

American architect (1913–1997)

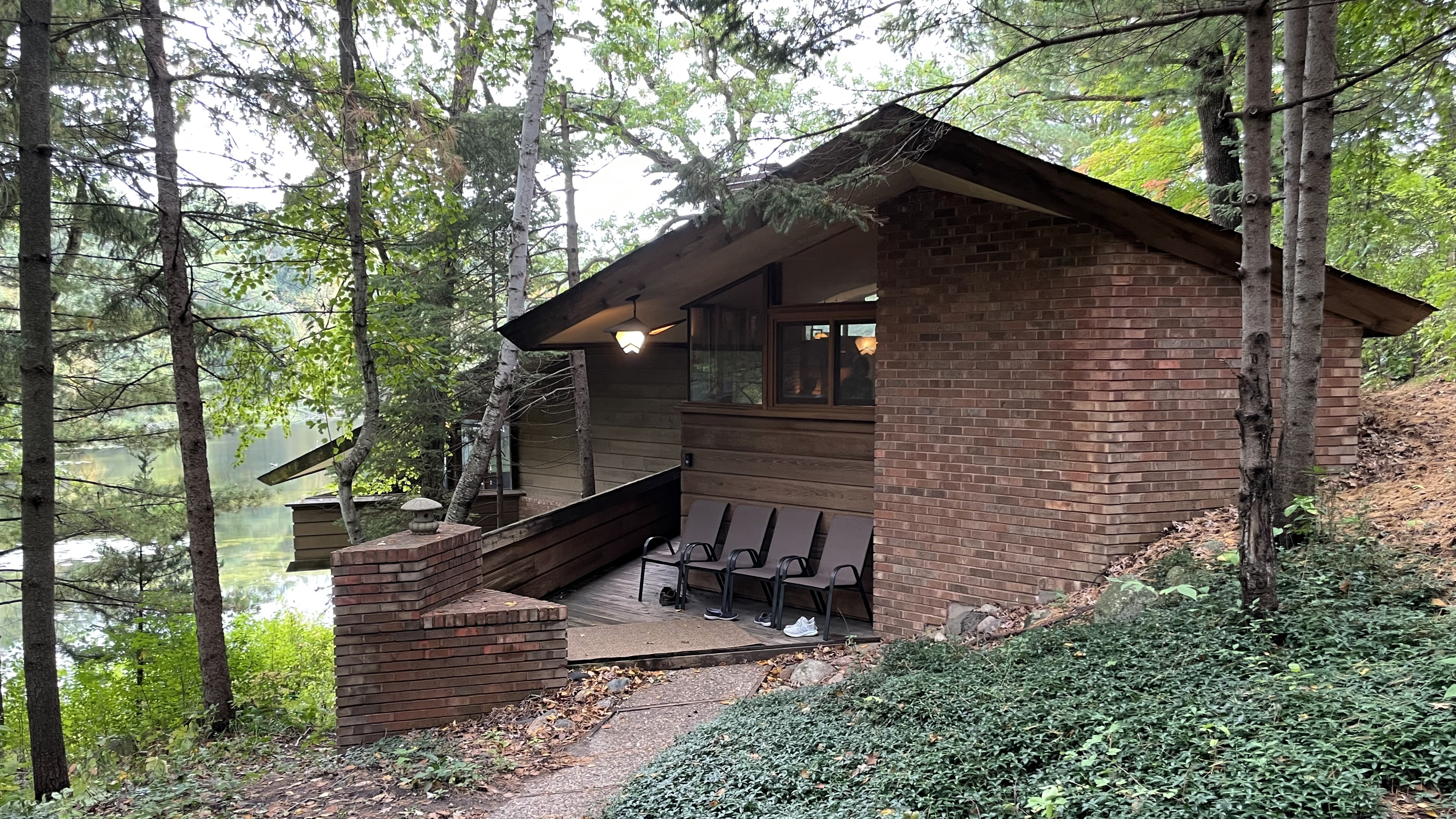
"Sankaku" (1971), Howe's own home nestled onto a lakefront.

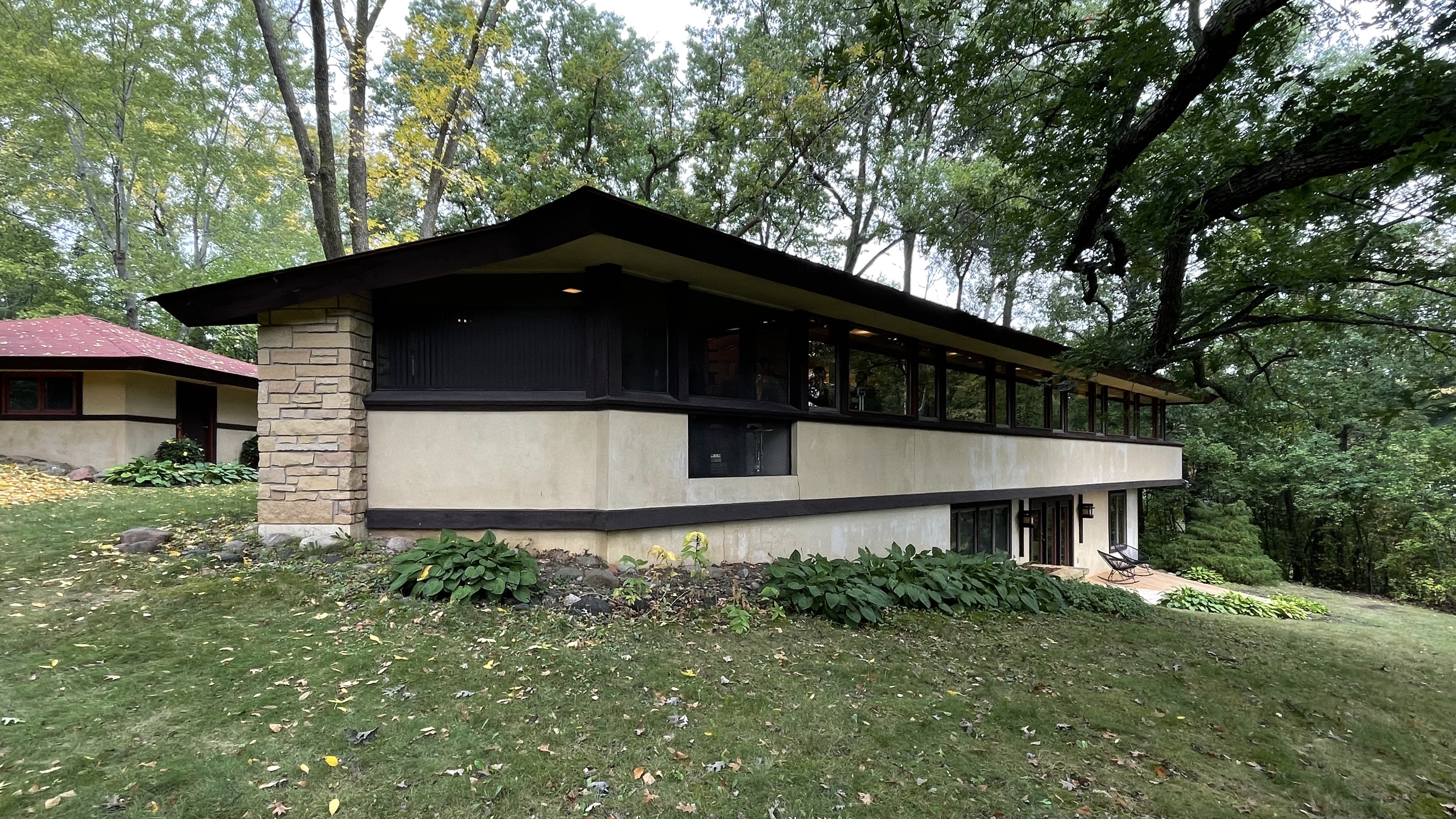
Howe's "Redleaf" (1979) in Lakeville, Minnesota.

John Henry Howe (1913–1997) was an American architect who started as an apprentice in 1932 under American architect Frank Lloyd Wright in Wright's Taliesin Fellowship. He was Wright's head draftsman from the late 1930s until Wright's death in 1959, left the Taliesin Fellowship in 1964, and, beginning in 1967, opened an architectural practice in Minneapolis, Minnesota. He died in California in 1997.

== Biography ==
Howe was born in Evanston, Illinois, on May 17, 1913. He lived and worked at Taliesin in Wisconsin and Taliesin West in Arizona from 1932 to 1964. He was one of Frank Lloyd Wright's first apprentices in the Taliesin Fellowship, beginning the year it opened, 1932. He became the chief draftsman in 1937 during construction of Fallingwater by Frank Lloyd Wright.

Howe was a conscientious objector during World War II and was placed in a Civilian Public Service (CPS) camp in Sandstone, Minnesota from 1943 to 1946 after which he returned to Taliesin. In 1947, he met Lu Sparks, and they married in 1951. Howe remained in the Taliesin Fellowship after Wright's death in 1959, and worked in Wright's successor firm, Taliesin Associated Architects, until 1964. After that, Howe went to California to work with former Wright apprentice Aaron Green (who was also Wright's representative in California) until 1967.

In 1967, Howe moved to Minnesota with his wife, Lu Sparks Howe, and opened an architecture office in Minneapolis. He retired in 1992 and moved to Novato, California, with his wife. He died in Novato September 21, 1997.

== Buildings ==
Wright buildings worked on by Howe include:

- Fallingwater
- Hanna-Honeycomb House
- Thomas Keys Residence
- Patrick and Margaret Kinney House
- Kenneth and Phyllis Laurent House
- Herman T. Mossberg Residence
- Melvyn Maxwell and Sara Stein Smith House
- Clarence Sondern House
- William & Mary Palmer House
- Robert H. Sunday House
- Duey and Julia Wright House (no relation to the architect)
- Marin County Civic Center

After Wright's death, Howe became the chief draftsman of Taliesin Associated Architects (the successor firm after Wright). He left in 1964 to work with Aaron Green, another former Wright apprentice who was a practicing architect in California. Howe stayed with Green until 1967. He decided to move to Minnesota and establish his architecture practice in Minneapolis.

As a practicing architect, Howe "refused to change the natural contours of a building site", and would only design the building after walking on the site.

Selected houses in Minnesota by Howe:

- Jerpbak house, Braemar Hills, Edina. 1969–70
- Weston house, Indian Hills, Edina. 1980
- Howe's own home, Sankaku, Horseshoe Lake, Burnsville. 1971
