= Eric and Margaret Ann (Davis) Brown House =

House in Kalamazoo, Michigan

- U.S. National Register of Historic Places
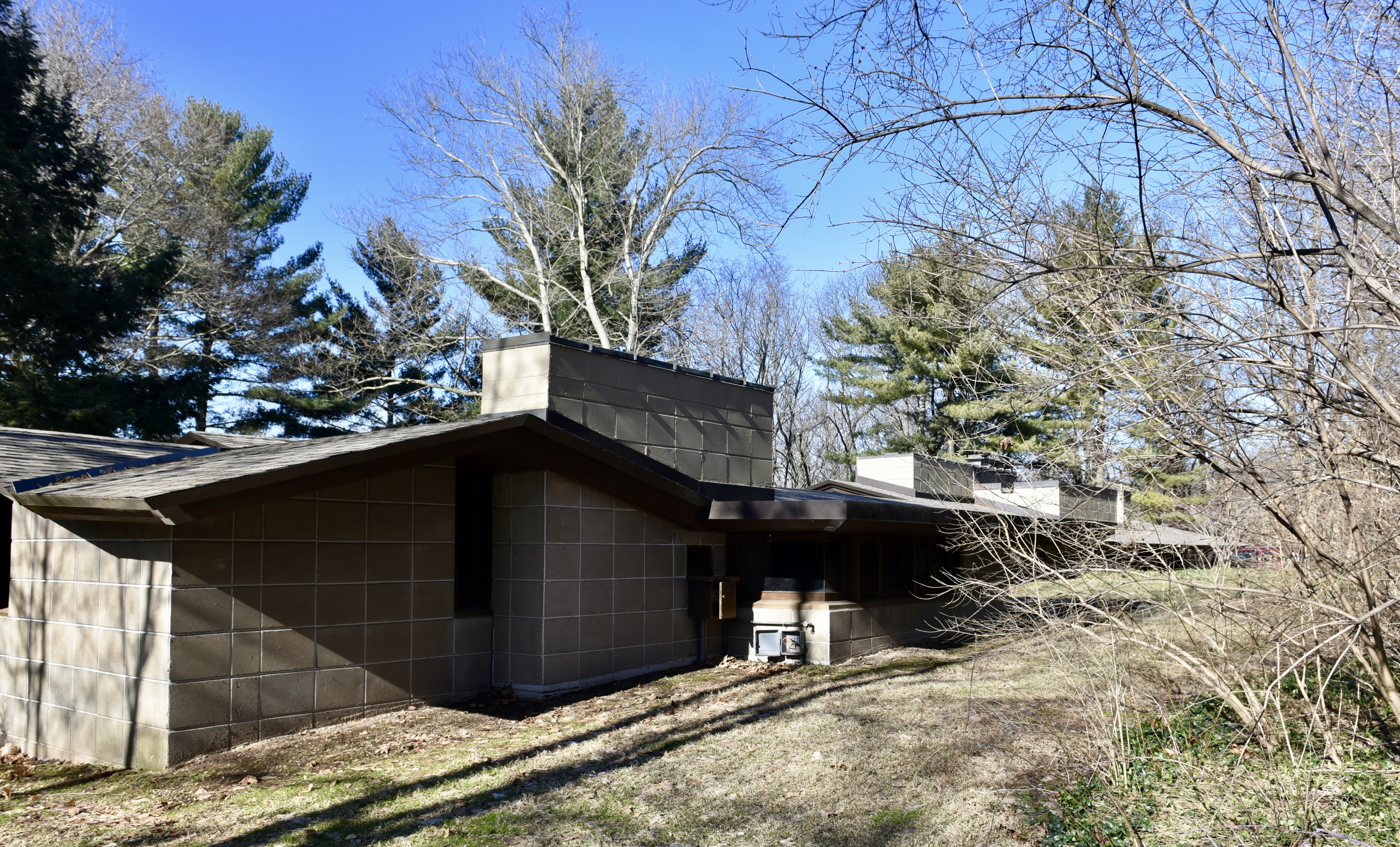

- Location within Michigan Location within the United States
- Interactive map showing the location of the Eric and Margaret Brown House
- Location: 2806 Taliesin Dr., Kalamazoo, Michigan
- Coordinates: 42°15′48″N 85°37′58″W
- Area: about 1 acre (0.40 ha)
- Built: 1950
- Built by: David Corning
- Architect: Frank Lloyd Wright
- Architectural style: Modern, Usonian
- NRHP reference No.: 16000200
- Added to NRHP: April 26, 2016

The Eric and Margaret Ann (Davis) Brown House is a single-family home located at 2806 Taliesin Drive in Kalamazoo, Michigan. It was listed on the National Register of Historic Places in 2016. It is perhaps one of the best preserved Usonian houses designed by Frank Lloyd Wright.

== History ==
Eric Brown was born in Royal Oak, Michigan, in 1914, graduated from Wayne State University, and received a law degree from the University of Michigan in 1937. He married Margaret Ann Davis in 1939. She was born in Plainwell, Michigan in 1913, and. She graduated from Carleton College in 1935. The couple lived in Grand Rapids for a few years, then moved to Kalamazoo in 1941. After a few years, Eric Brown started his own law firm. In 1946, the Browns and five other families established the Parkwyn Village Association, with the intention of constructing a "congenial housing community" where they could raise their families. The association contacted Frank Lloyd Wright about designing homes for the planned community.

Construction began on the Brown's home in 1950, and the family moved into the house in 1951. The couple lived in the house until 2002, when health issued forced them to move, Eric Brown died later that year, and Margaret followed in 2006. In 2002, the Browns sold the home to Kathryn and Curtis Curtis-Smith. Peter and Janet Copeland purchased the Brown House in 2012.

== Description ==
The Brown House is a single-story, rectangular Usonian house with a slightly pitched, cantilevered roof. The house measures 130 feet long and 18 to 32 feet wide (40x4,5-10 m), measuring approximately 2,684 square feet (250 m2) of living space. It is set well back from the street on a mostly wooded, one acre lot. The house is built with concrete blocks and set into a sloping hillside, so that the house has a very low appearance from the street (the uphill side). The low, street-facing facade contains a row of clerestory windows running the length of the house which sit only about twelve inches off the ground. The opposite facade overlooks Lorenz Lake, and contains large windows and doors along most of its length. A walled patio also runs along the facade.

== See also ==
- National Register of Historic Places listings in Kalamazoo County, Michigan
- List of Frank Lloyd Wright works
