= The Acres =

Residential development in Michigan, US

- The Acres (Galesburg Country Homes)
- U.S. National Register of Historic Places
- U.S. Historic district
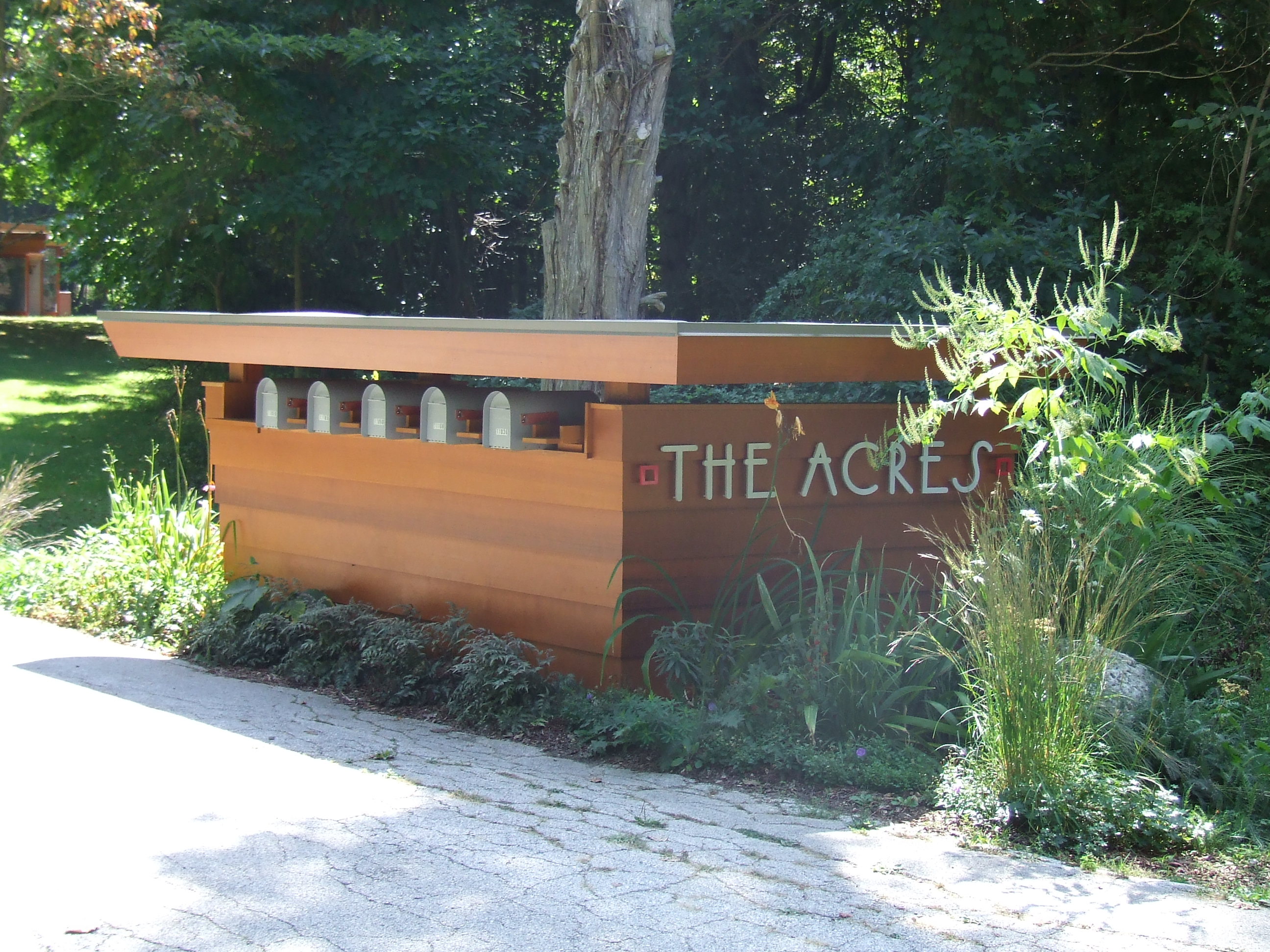

- Location within Michigan
- Interactive map showing the location of The Acres
- Location: Charleston Township, Michigan
- Coordinates: 42°15′40″N 85°24′43″W
- Built: 1949
- Architect: Frank Lloyd Wright
- Architectural style: Usonian
- NRHP reference No.: 04000458
- Added to NRHP: May 19, 2004

The Acres, also known as Galesburg Country Homes, is a 71.25-acre (28.83 ha) residential development in Charleston Township, Michigan, United States. Developed starting in the late 1940s, it consists of 21 or 22 circular land lots, of which five contain houses. Four of the houses were designed by Frank Lloyd Wright, while the other was designed by Taliesin Associated Architects fellow Francis Wilsey after Wright's death. The Acres also contains 50 acres (20 ha) of open land, including a pond; the entire complex is accessed through a single road, Hawthorne Drive. The development was listed on the National Register of Historic Places as a historic district in 2004.

From west to east, the development consists of the Pratt, Fonken, Meyer, Eppstein, and Weisblat houses. All of the houses have different designs, though each has a concrete-block and mahogany exterior. The Pratt, Weisblat, and Eppstein houses are designed in the Usonian style with an "in-line" floor plan. The Usonian houses generally share features such as open plan floor layouts, radiant heating systems, overhanging flat roofs, and carports. The Fonken House is partially built into a hill, with a capital "T"-shaped layout, and the Meyer House is a solar hemicycle. All of the houses have either two or three bedrooms, in addition to rooms such as a combined living–dining space and a kitchen.

In the 1940s, a group of scientists from the Upjohn pharmaceutical company planned to build a community of homes. They eventually split into two groups, who developed the Galesburg Country Homes on a farm and Parkwyn Village closer to Kalamazoo; both groups hired Wright to design their respective projects. Plans for the Acres called for up to 22 houses on the site, most of which were never built. The first four houses (for the Weisblat, Pratt, Eppstein, and Meyer families) were built from 1948 to 1953, and two of them were subsequently expanded. Wilsey designed an additional house for the Fonken family in 1959, after Wright died. After the houses were completed, each house was sold several times; the last original resident, Christine Weisblat, died in 2007.

== Site ==
The Acres (officially the Galesburg Country Homes Acres) is located in Charleston Township, Kalamazoo County, Michigan, United States, in the eastern suburbs of Kalamazoo. The development, spanning 71.25 acres (28.83 ha), (Note: Other sources disagree on whether the tract covered 71 acres (29 ha) or 72 acres (29 ha).) is located just south of Interstate 94 and about 2 miles (3.2 km) south of Galesburg. It is one of several Usonian developments planned by Frank Lloyd Wright and one of the first Wright–designed multi-family developments that were actually completed. Prior to designing the Acres, Wright had drawn plans for other multi-family developments such as the unbuilt Broadacre City; the partially built Suntop Homes in Ardmore, Pennsylvania; and the Usonia Homes in Pleasantville, New York.

The houses are accessed from Hawthorne Drive, a narrow, winding street flanked by trees; it serves as the only thoroughfare in the Acres. At the entrance to the neighborhood is a stone signpost structure, which contains letters spelling out "The Acres" on one side. The signpost measures about 6 feet (1.8 m) wide by 5 feet (1.5 m) tall. There are six niches within the signpost: one for packages and the other five for mail (with each family having its own mail niche).

=== Land lots ===
The southern half of the development includes either 21 or 22 (Note: Some sources cite a figure of 21 lots, while others give a figure of 22 lots. Aguar & Aguar 2002, p. 253, says that 44 lots were originally contemplated.) circular land lots with an area of 1 acre (44,000 ft^{2}; 4,000 m^{2}). The lots each measure 114 feet (35 m) in diameter and are located on both sides of Hawthorne Drive. Since the circular lots are tangent to each other, there are large tracts of communal land in between each lot. The use of circular lots contrasted with Wright's other designs, such as the Usonian Houses in Pleasantville and Parkwyn Village in Kalamazoo, Michigan, both of which used polygonal lots. Wright's original plans called for the tracts to be clearly demarcated so that "any house owner can tell where his lot limits are", and for the areas between each tract to be filled with native plants. In practice, there are no clear boundaries between each lot, and some of the landscaping stretches across multiple lots.

Although seven of the lots were sold to individual owners, only five of these contain houses. Three of the houses are located south of Hawthorne Drive, while two are to the north. The Fonken and Meyer houses are accessed by driveways branching off Hawthorne Drive to the north and south, respectively, and the other houses are closer to the road. The Fonken House is accessed by a curving driveway that slopes down from Hawthorne Drive north of the Pratt House. Another driveway extends southeast near the Pratt House, ascending a slope before looping back to the north; the Meyer House is located on this driveway.

=== Common areas ===
The development was also intended to have 50 acres (20 ha) of open land. The unsold lots and all of the open land are communally owned by the Acres' residents. Throughout the complex are grassy paths measuring 8 to 30 feet (2.4 to 9.1 m) wide, which meander between the lots. The winding paths made it harder for random people to amble around, thereby protecting the privacy of the Acres' occupants.

A creek and a bog run through the Acres; the presence of these geographical features had been particularly attractive to Frank Lloyd Wright, the architect who designed four of the Acres' five houses. There is a pond at the northern end of the development, which is cited as covering 3 acres (1.2 ha) or 4 acres (1.6 ha) and was created by placing a dam across the creek. The pond is fed by a natural stream on the site. Prior to the development of the Acres, the stream was too shallow for swimming or fishing; depending on the time of year, it could measure as small as 12 inches (300 mm) wide and 6 inches (150 mm) deep. Early plans for the development entailed the creation of multiple terraces with ponds, though this was ultimately not done. The rest of the Acres contains vegetation and trees. There is a communal tennis court next to the Eppstein House, which dates from 1958.

== Architecture ==
Wright designed nearly all of the buildings at the Acres, in contrast to both Parkwyn Village and the Pleasantville Usonian development, where Wright designed only a small number of buildings. At the Acres, Wright designed the Weisblat, Pratt, Eppstein, and Meyer houses, while the Fonken House was designed by Francis "Will" Willsey, a onetime apprentice of Wright's at Taliesin Associated Architects. In general, the Usonian houses have open plans, large windows for passive heating, floors with embedded radiant heating systems, overhanging flat roofs, and a carport. These houses also included built-in furniture, small bathrooms and hallways, and large living rooms. The Acres' houses are made of 25,000 concrete blocks, which are known as "Usonian Automatic Blocks" because they were manufactured by the houses' own residents. Each of the Usonian Automatic Blocks was cast around a metal mold, permitting a hollow interior structure, and the outer edges of the blocks are grooved so that rebar could be inserted between the blocks.

Although the five houses have unique designs, all are low-rise structures with horizontal roof lines. The Pratt, Weisblat, and Eppstein houses are designed in the Usonian style; they are sometimes characterized as Usonian Automatic houses because their concrete-block construction contrasts with the board-and-batten design of typical Usonian houses. Like some of Wright's other Usonian designs, they are arranged around an "in-line" plan, in which all the rooms are arranged more-or-less along an axis, with bedrooms on one end. By contrast, the Meyer House is a solar hemicycle and is arranged to maximize sunlight exposure. While the Pratt, Weisblat, and Eppstein houses used Usonian Automatic Blocks, the Meyer House was built out of standard concrete blocks. The Fonken House, though built later, is also designed in a Usonian style. One source described the Acres as "Wright's first foray into organic ranch-style architecture".

=== Pratt House ===
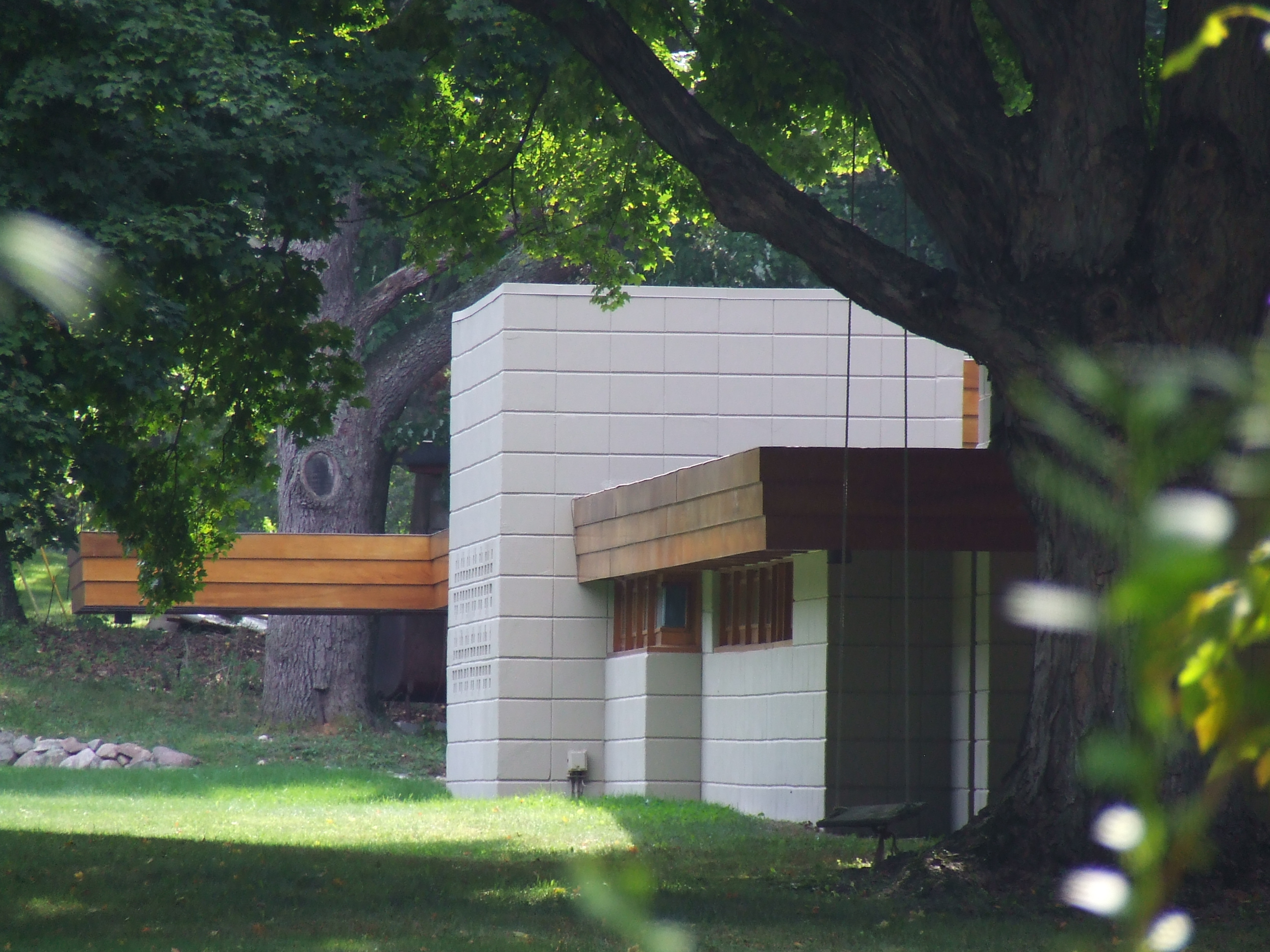
The Eric and Pat Pratt House

The Eric and Pat Pratt House is at 11036 Hawthorne Drive. It is on the southern side of the road and is the first building that is visible when entering the Acres. The Pratt House is oriented from east to west, with a taller "core" at the center of the house. There is a concrete-and-wood storage shed northeast of the house, which is built into the western slope of a hill.

The Pratt House's facade, made of concrete blocks and mahogany trim, is topped by a flat roof and overhanging eaves. The center of the house's northern elevation has perforated concrete blocks, which illuminate the interior while still providing privacy, while the eastern elevation is made of solid concrete. The rest of the facade has windows of varying sizes, including some floor-to-ceiling windows. There is also a carport at the northeast corner of the house.

The house has 2,000 square feet (190 m^{2}) or 2,200 square feet (200 m^{2}), with two bathrooms and two bedrooms. The interior is arranged around a grid of 4-by-4-foot (1.2 by 1.2 m) square modules, and has decorations such as a red concrete floor and mahogany trim. There is a radiant heating system beneath the floor slab. The bedrooms, study, and one bathroom are within the western end of the house. A second bathroom, a "workspace" kitchen, and laundry room are located within the house's core, while the western part of the living–dining room abuts the core to the south. The rest of the living–dining room, along with the studio and carport, are to the east of the core; the living–dining room has two fireplaces. The Pratt family constructed their own house; since they were not experienced contractors, some of the interior walls do not line up with the floor grid. The house originally had three bedrooms, but a partition between two of the bedrooms was removed in the 1990s.

=== Fonken House ===
The Günther and Anne Fonken House is at 11069 Hawthorne Drive. Designed by Wilsey in a style resembling Wright's other work, it is sometimes nicknamed "the not-so-Wright house" because it was designed by a different architect than all the other houses in the Acres. Its northern facade is built into an earthen berm that covers about three-tenths of the house. Unlike the Wright houses, the Fonken House is laid out with two wings in the shape of the capital letter "T". The facade is made of concrete blocks and mahogany trim, and the house is capped by a hip roof. There is a concrete-block mechanical structure at the intersection of the house's wings, as well as clerestory windows throughout the facade.

The "stem" of the T runs west–east and contains the main living areas. The stem ends at a north–south crossbar which contains bedrooms at its northern end and a carport at its southern end. The master bedroom is located at the northeast corner of the crossbar, with floor-to-ceiling windows and a patio outside the master bedroom.

=== Meyer House ===
The Curtis and Lillian Meyer House is located at 11108 Hawthorne Drive and is the only solar hemicycle–style structure in the Acres. The house is two stories high. Accessed from both the driveway and the carport, it is composed of a curving wing with the interior of the curve facing east. Southeast of the house is a rectangular concrete-block garden shed measuring 10 by 18 feet (3.0 m × 5.5 m), with a gable roof. Also near the house is a concrete-block tractor shed, which has a double door to its north, sash windows to its west and east, and a gable roof.

The Meyer House's exterior is made of hollow-core concrete blocks with mahogany trim. At the eastern end of the house is a drum-shaped cylindrical mass, as well as a carport extending south of the drum. Along the house's outer curve to the west, the house's lower level is underground, and there are windows on the second floor. The ground slopes down to the southeast, where the lower-level facade is visible; on the lower level, there is a storage area under the carport. There are clerestory windows at the top of the drum, as well as a cantilevered balcony protruding from it. The inner curve of the house is shielded by an eave that protrudes significantly, and there are also 10-foot-tall (3.0 m) doors leading to the house's garden. One of the eaves originally had a tree growing through it, since Wright generally did not want to disrupt preexisting natural features.

The house has three bedrooms and three bathrooms. The floor plan is arranged around a grid of radial lines, which converge at a point outside the house. The radial lines divide the house into sections with a central angle of 7.5 degrees, which in turn are divided into arcs measuring 32 inches (810 mm) wide. There is a radiant heating system beneath the floor slab. Inside the house, much of the first story is occupied by a combined living–dining room. The drum contains a staircase, which adjoins a workspace kitchen and utility space on the first level, as well as a study on the second level. The rest of the second story consists of two bedrooms and a bathroom, united by a gallery. The bedrooms are above the rear of the living room, which allow the front portion of the living room to be a two-story space with a spacious skylight.

=== Eppstein House ===
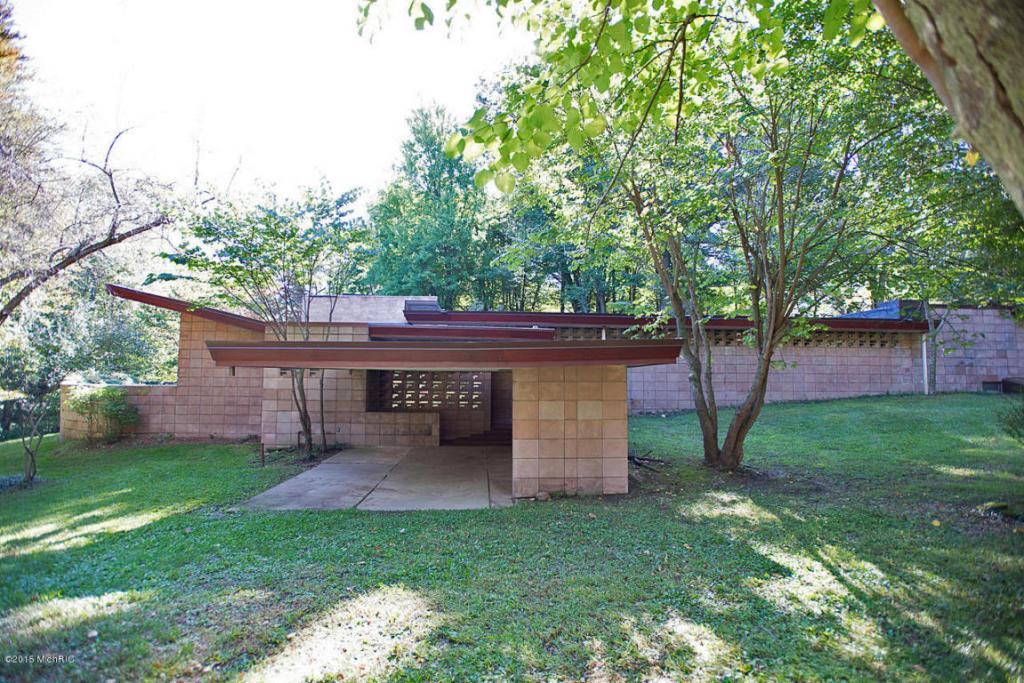
The Samuel and Dorothy Eppstein House

The Samuel and Dorothy Eppstein House at 11090 Hawthorne Drive is just south of the road. The Eppstein House is oriented north–south, running perpendicularly to the Pratt House. A carport, extending west from the northern half of the house, serves as the main entrance. Just southeast of the house is a pool surrounded by a concrete deck, as well as a wooden pool house measuring about 8 by 12 feet (2.4 by 3.7 m) across.

In general, the Eppstein House's facade is made of concrete blocks and mahogany. The western elevation of the facade has solid concrete walls with perforated-block panels. The southern elevation has floor-to-ceiling windows, a raised roof section, and a terrace. There are a mixture of shoulder-height windows and floor-to-ceiling panels on the eastern elevation. The northern elevation also includes floor-to-ceiling windows, which are covered by an upward-sloping roof. A terrace along the eastern elevation of the house connects the master bedroom and living room, and another terrace at the northern end of the house is surrounded by a semicircular parapet wall.

The house has two bathrooms and three bedrooms; it is variously cited as having 2,200 square feet (200 m^{2}), 2,250 square feet (209 m^{2}), or 2,500 square feet (230 m^{2}) of space. The floor plan is arranged around a grid of 4-by-4-foot (1.2 by 1.2 m) square modules and has decorations such as a red concrete floor and mahogany trim. The living–dining room and the workspace kitchen are in the northern half of the house, while the bedrooms are in the southern half. The northernmost bedroom is the master bedroom, which is next to a bath and laundry room. To the south are four smaller bedrooms (two of which adjoin a second bathroom), in addition to a general-purpose room at the southern end of the house. The current layout dates to a 1959 expansion, when the house was expanded to include a basement, terrace, and family room.

=== Weisblat House ===
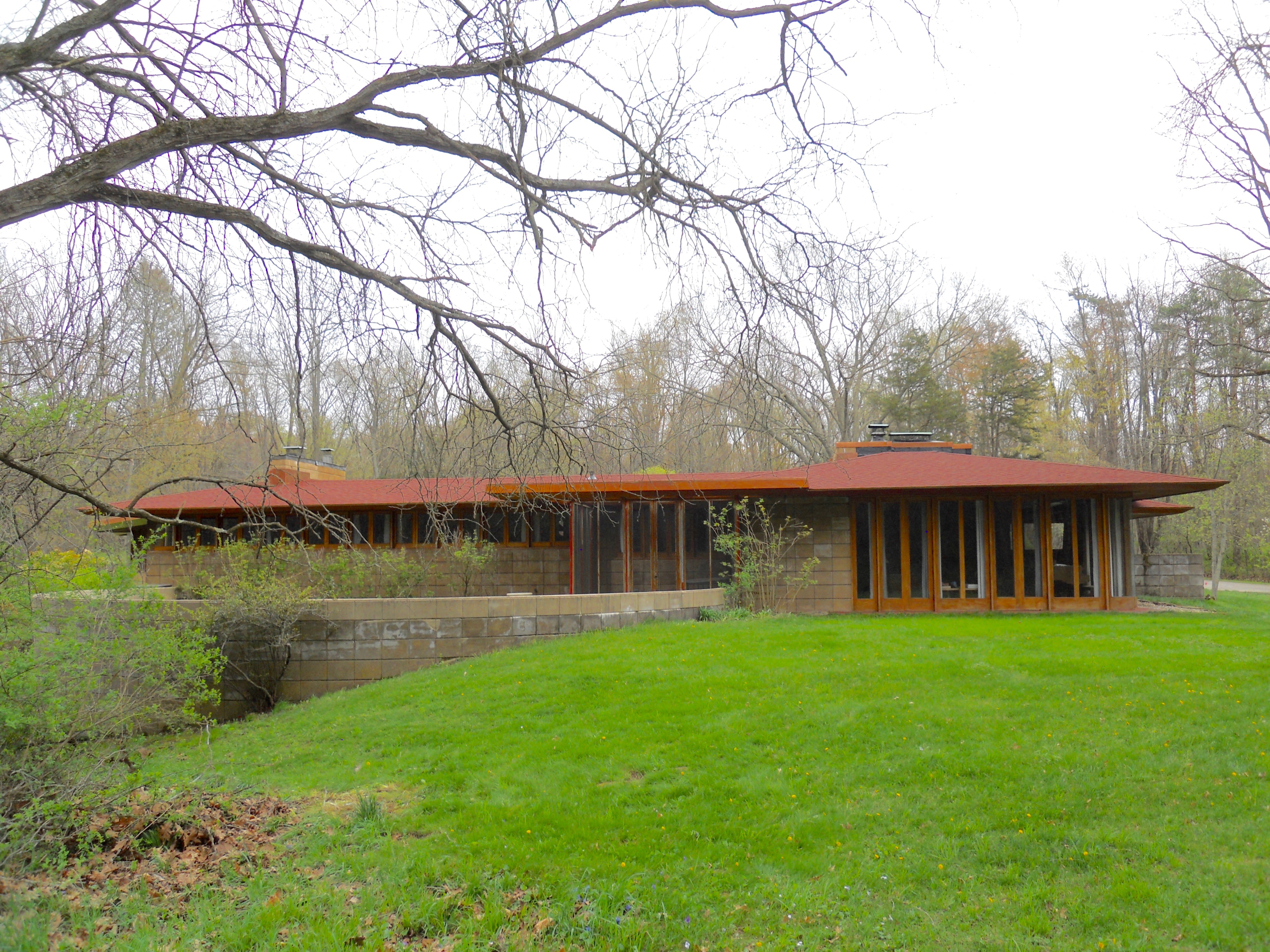
The David and Christine Weisblat House

The David and Christine Weisblat House is located at 11185 Hawthorne Drive, on the northern side of the road. The original house was designed by Wright, while his apprentices William Wesley Peters and John H. Howe designed an annex. Peters and Howe's annex runs at a 120-degree angle to the original house, extending northeast of Wright's structure. To the east is a standalone garden shed with a concrete-block facade, a small window, and a hip roof. There is also a frog pond to the southwest, which measures about 14 by 20 feet (4.3 by 6.1 m) and dates from the construction of the house's annex.

The original house's facade is generally made of concrete blocks and mahogany, and one side of the concrete blocks is embossed with a chevron pattern; the annex is made of the same materials. Thirty-four different shapes of concrete blocks were used to construct the exterior walls. There is a carport at the northern end of the house, which contains the house's main entrance at one corner. The original portion of the house has a gable roof, and the annex has a flat roof; the eaves protrude up to 4 feet (1.2 m) from the facade. The roof lacks structural steel; a rooftop eave, cantilevered from the living-room facade, is supported by brick headers. Part of the original house is embedded into the slope of a hill and is illuminated by clerestory windows. There is an enclosed patio just west of the original house, as well as a larger patio surrounding it. The northwest corner of the house has a screened-in porch despite Wright's opposition to that design feature. The backyard has glass doors.

The house has 2,429 square feet (225.7 m^{2}) and contains two bedrooms and two-and-a-half bathrooms. The original structure is arranged around a grid of 4-by-4-foot (1.2 by 1.2 m) square modules and has decorations such as a red concrete floor and mahogany trim. There is a radiant heating system beneath the floor slab. Like the Eppstein and Pratt houses, the Weisblat House is arranged linearly; the living–dining room and the workspace kitchen are at the southern end of the house, while the bedrooms are at the northern end. There is a banquette in the dining area. A narrow passageway, with clerestory windows, links the two parts of the original house. All of these rooms have windows, except the workspace, which has only a skylight. Peters and Howe's annex includes a laundry room, bathroom, bedroom, study, greenhouse, and shed. The annex also includes a basement, a highly unusual feature for a Usonian house. As with many of his Usonian houses, Wright designed the Weisblat House's furniture, including tables, shelves, and built-in storage.

== History ==
=== Development ===
In the early 1940s, a group of employees from the Upjohn Company, a pharmaceutical company, began planning a housing cooperative community in Kalamazoo, Michigan. Christine Weisblat, the wife of Upjohn employee David Weisblat, recalled that they began searching for a site with between 60 and 100 acres (2,600,000 and 4,400,000 ft^{2}; 240,000 and 400,000 m^{2}) in 1943–1944, with the intent of developing a residential commune there after the end of World War II. Following a recommendation from the Upjohn family's gardener, they toured the Bilotta Farm site in Galesburg, 12 miles (19 km) from Kalamazoo, in 1946. Some Upjohn employees, who disliked a rural site, formed a separate association to develop Parkwyn Village. The groups collaborated on the development of their subdivisions; for example, they ran joint advertisements and employed the same lawyer. Some members of both groups also employed Frank Lloyd Wright as their architect, and he ultimately designed four houses for each group.

==== Design ====
In September 1946, the Galesburg group established a nonprofit organization called the Galesburg Country Homes Association; they later adopted the nickname "the Acres". Before they hired Wright, the group had sent letters to numerous architects across the U.S., and they had considered developing the houses in the Cape Cod style. The group approached Wright about designing the subdivision in October. He readily agreed, particularly after some of the group's members had compared the Galesburg site favorably to Taliesin, his own architectural studio. In addition to designing each Acres member's house in exchange for 10% of each house's cost, Wright agreed to devise plans for the site's layout free of charge, since he was impressed that the group knew what they wanted. The group visited the Bilotta Farm site during the winter of 1946–1947 and were unimpressed with it; they decided to buy the farm only after returning in early 1947, during the springtime.

The Acres' minutes indicate that the group met nearly every week, making decisions about the development jointly. Members spent three months drawing a topographical map, documenting every geographical feature on the site, in their spare time. Wright visited the site in March 1947 to gather information. After viewing the topographical map, Wright decided to cluster the houses at the development's southern end, with a natural-looking landscape at the northern end. Wright presented plans for the Acres to the Galesburg group in October 1947. The plan consisted of numerous land lots laid-out in an unconventional circular pattern, with the interstitial areas to be held in common. There would be a playground, small farm, and community garden, as well as a watercourse. Part of the development was to be preserved in its natural condition, and the development also contained several curving roads between the circular lots. By then, six families had expressed interest in the Galesburg development; overall, the group wanted at least 15 families to develop houses there.

The Acres' members held a lottery to determine which family would get which lot. Afterward, each member wrote to Wright about what exactly they wanted in their respective houses. After communicating their desired design features to Wright, they visited the architect's Taliesin studio in Spring Green, Wisconsin, to discuss their plan with the architect. Eric Pratt, the Acres' purchasing agent, joined the Acres after everyone else had, and Wright agreed to design a house for the Pratt family as well. Though most of the houses were designed in the Usonian style, Wright, who was drawing up plans for a solar hemicycle structure, gave the hemicycle plans to Curtis and Lillian Meyer after Curtis expressed interest in that design. Financial institutions were reluctant to lend money for the Acres because of its unusual design. For example, they expressed concerns that the Weisblat House's kitchen skylight would cause heat stroke and that the carport canopies would collapse, though neither happened. The Acres' members eventually found other financing, as they wanted to preserve their circular land lots' shapes.

==== Construction ====
Side view of the Eppstein House, which was expanded in 1959

The Acres' members largely built the development themselves. They spent their weekends installing fences, clearing the land, and surveying the site. By late 1948, H. H. Shinville Inc. had laid out the roads, which followed the natural topography for the most part. The families next began constructing concrete masonry units, having failed to find a contractor to manufacture them; the material was chosen both because of postwar shortages and to save money. Work on the concrete blocks started in mid-1949, and the families experimented with various amounts of cement, dye, water, and sand until they were satisfied with the mixture. After creating the blocks, the families cured the concrete by sprinkling water over them, a process that took weeks. Carpenters then laid the blocks along the houses' floor grids. Because there were additional blocks left over, some of the blocks were shared with the families at Parkwyn Village. Wright also forced the families to mill their own woodwork and create their own furniture. The woodwork was sourced from a pile of Honduran mahogany that was shared with Parkwyn Village.

Wright's apprentice John H. Howe, who was appointed to oversee the Acres' construction, sometimes came to observe the work. Neither Wright nor Howe were particularly involved in construction. Christine Weisblat said that, on one of the few times that Wright did visit the site, he advised the Acres' members to not "be too precise [while laying] up the blocks", a recommendation that Christine's husband disliked. The Acres' members held Howe in higher regard; Christine Weisblat later reflected that Wright was less approachable than Howe was. During 1950 and 1951, the Acres' members hired college students to help with three of the Acres' homes. The Weisblat family eventually gave up on constructing their house themselves, hiring outside contractors to complete the work at night while Wright was not paying attention. Despite being interested in Wright's designs, all of the Acres' families soon became so frustrated with the architect that, according to Wright expert Brian Kirksey, "none of them wanted to work with him ever again."

The Weisblat House was completed in 1951, being the first finished house in the development. The Pratts built their house starting in 1950 and moved in during September 1951. The Curtis and Lillian Meyer House was also constructed between 1950 and 1951, and the first phase of the Samuel and Dorothy Eppstein House was completed from 1951 to 1953. The Pratt family added a study and bedroom to their house in 1953, and the Eppstein House was expanded in 1959 with a terrace, family room, and basement. After Wright's death, the Fonken family wanted to hire Wright's former apprentice Lee Kawahara to design them a house at the Acres, but the family had to find another architect after Kawahara disappeared without telling them. Wilsey was hired to develop a house for Gunther and Anne Fonken, who moved into their house in December 1960. Howe and William Wesley Peters designed an addition to the Weisblat House in 1961, which included a greenhouse, laundry, and family room.

=== Subsequent sales ===
==== 1960s to 1990s ====
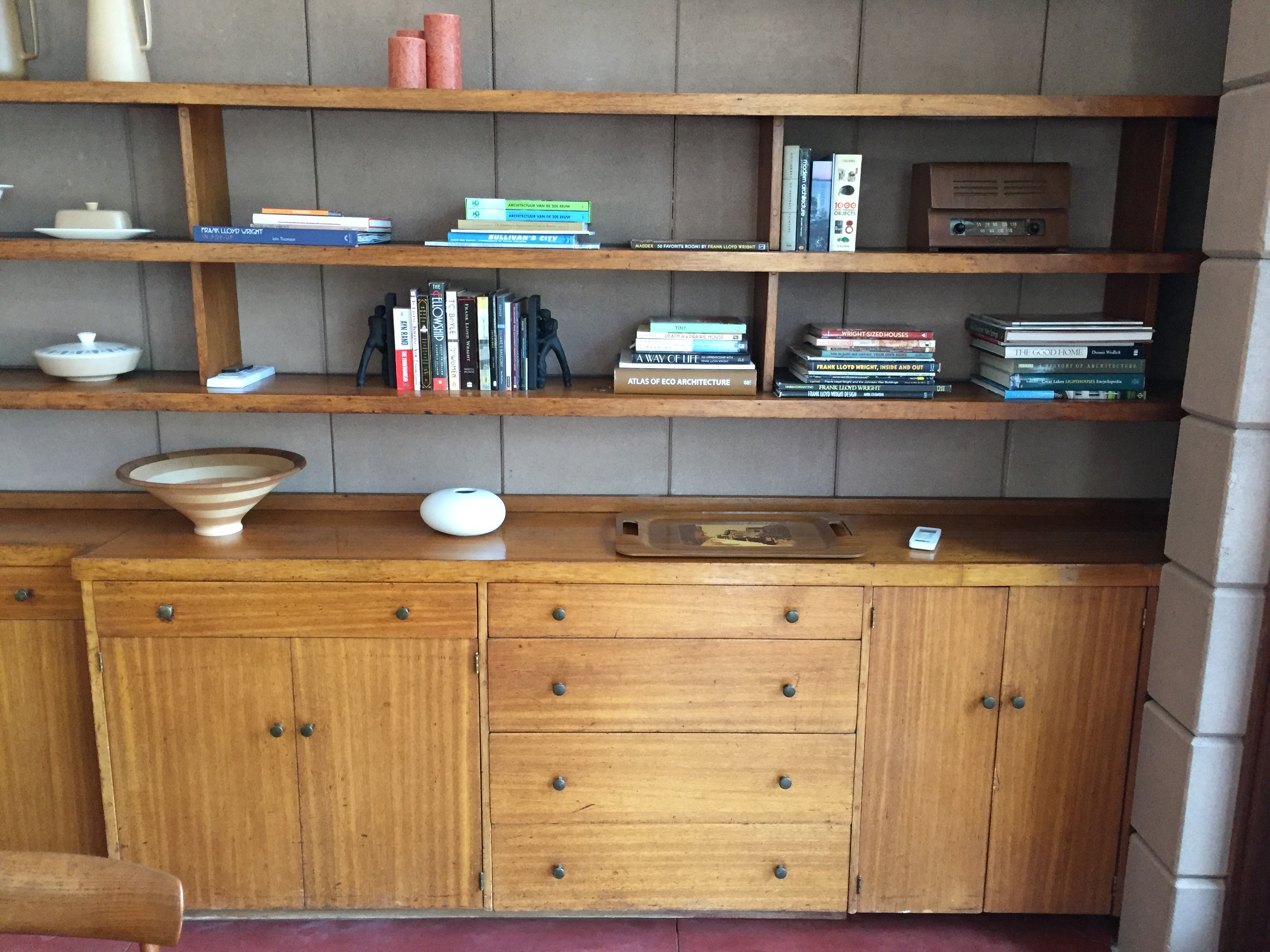
Wright designed the homes' built-in furniture.

In the years after the Acres was completed, its residents attempted to invite additional families to build houses there. Several of the Acres' members later wrote memoirs about their houses, including the Pratt family, who published a book chronicling their house's construction. Eventually, the members stopped marketing the Acres to prospective residents, as no one had taken the offer, and the existing residents were satisfied with the fact that there were only five houses. The annual meetings also became less frequent, and the families eventually met only once a year.

The Pratt family was the first to leave, selling their house in 1979; the family's adult children had all moved out, and the Pratts were unable to keep up with the required maintenance. Subsequently, the Pratt House fell into disrepair. The remaining families continued to own the rest of the houses. The American Institute of Architects gave the Acres' residents an architectural-design award in 1984, honoring the development's architecture. By the 1990s, the Couch family owned the Meyer House, while the teacher Arlene Moran owned the Pratt House. Moran, who purchased her house in 1992, spent $180,000 renovating it and attempted to sell it, with little success. The businessman Matt Kane obtained the Eppstein House in the late 1990s, and that house was refurbished during 1998 and 1999. Afterward, the Eppstein House fell into disrepair and was not maintained for nearly two decades.

==== 2000s to present ====
The concert singer Doug LaBrecque acquired the Meyer House in 2003 and subsequently renovated that house to designs by Lawrence R. Brink, a Taliesin–trained architect. LaBrecque's restoration, a multi-year project, later received a Wright Spirit Award from the Frank Lloyd Wright Building Conservancy. By the early 2000s, Christine Weisblat was the only remaining original resident of the Acres. The development was added to the National Register of Historic Places as a historic district in 2004, after Weisblat and the preservationist Pam O'Connor nominated the development for landmark protection. After Weisblat died in 2007, her children shared ownership of the Weisblat House, though none of them lived there.

The Fonken House was sold in 2013. The Weisblat family placed their house for sale in 2016 and sold it the next year to Gloria Poore and Benjamin Harroll, who spent $500,000 renovating the structure. Also in 2016, married couple Tony Hillebrandt and Marika Broere bought the Eppstein House for $368,000; the house had been listed for sale for four years. Hillebrandt and Broere renovated the Eppstein House, including the floor, windows, woodwork, roof, and mechanical systems; they offered that house for rent on Airbnb in 2017, once the renovation had been completed. Afterward, Hillebrandt and Broere decided to buy the vacant Pratt House from its owner, a Detroit attorney. They acquired the Pratt House in 2021, signing a land contract that did not require them to pay interest. Hillebrandt and Broere restored the Pratt House's roof, woodwork, and concrete, and they replaced the electrical and mechanical systems in both the Pratt and Eppstein houses. The couple spent an estimated $1 million on these renovations.

Hillebrandt and Broere placed the Pratt and Eppstein houses for sale in 2023; they initially intended to sell only one of the structures, using the other as a private residence. The Pratt House was sold in June 2024 for $1.8 million. The Eppstein House continued to be rented out on Airbnb, earning up to $150,000 a year, and the Meyer House was also rented out on Airbnb. The Eppstein House was still listed for sale in early 2025, when the Weisblat House was also placed for sale. Poore gave the Frank Lloyd Wright Building Conservancy an easement to prevent the Weisblat House's redevelopment, and Poore and Harroll obtained a court order that prevented any further development in the Acres.

== See also ==
- List of Frank Lloyd Wright works
- National Register of Historic Places listings in Kalamazoo County, Michigan
