= Charles E. Roberts Stable =

Barn in Oak Park, Illinois

- U.S. Historic district – Contributing property
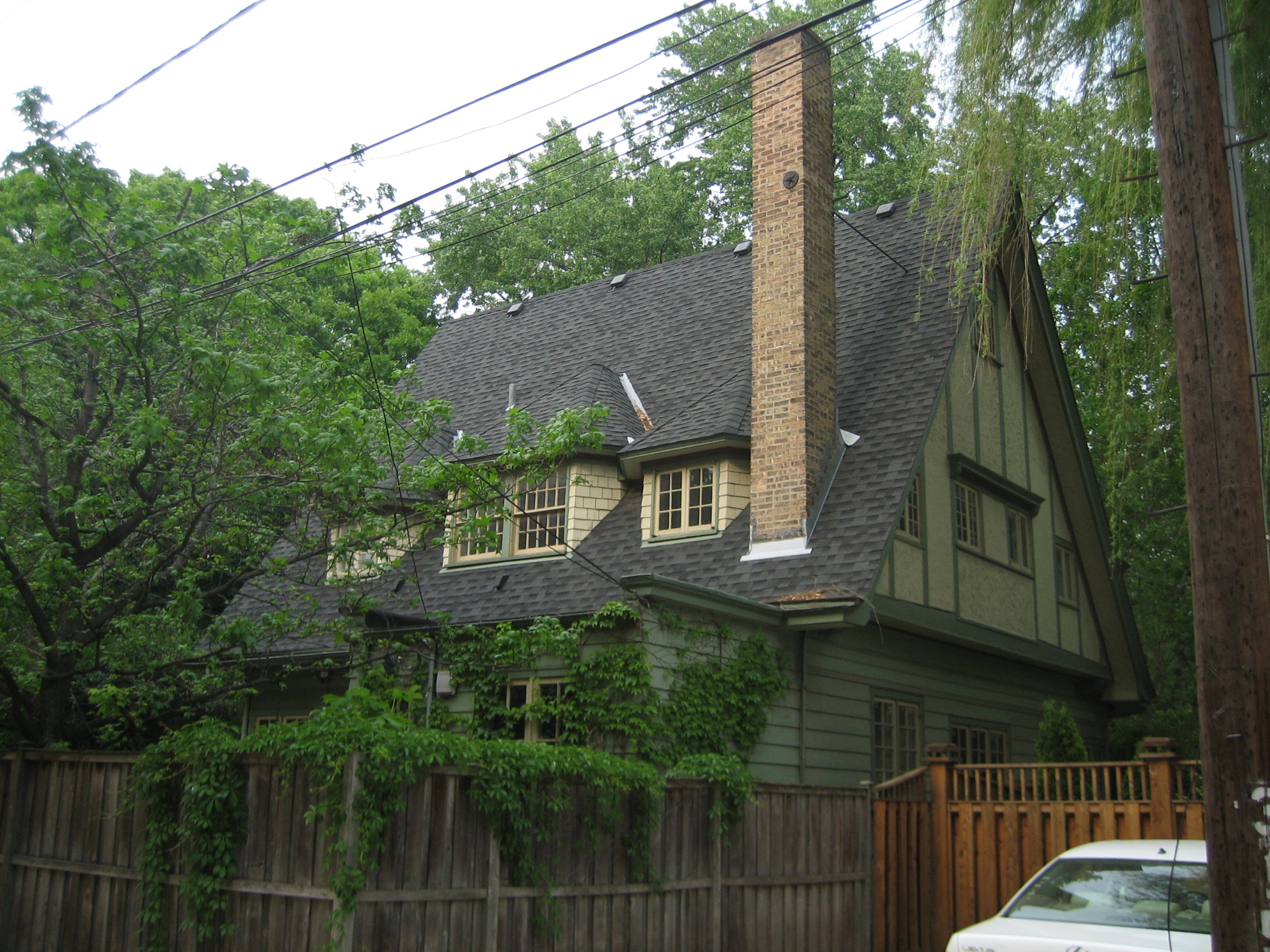
- The Roberts Stable's rear elevation, viewed from a public alleyway

- Location within Illinois Location within the United States
- Interactive map showing the location of Charles E. Roberts Stable
- Location: Oak Park, Cook County, Illinois, USA
- Coordinates: 41°53′32″N 87°47′36″W
- Built: 1896
- Architect: Frank Lloyd Wright (remodel); Charles E. White Jr. (residential conversion)
- Architectural style: Tudor Revival
- Part of: Frank Lloyd Wright-Prairie School of Architecture Historic District (ID73000699)
- Added to NRHP: December 4, 1973

The Charles E. Roberts Stable is a renovated former barn in Oak Park, a suburb of Chicago, Illinois, United States. The building has a long history of remodeling work including an 1896 transformation by famous American architect Frank Lloyd Wright.

The stable remodel was commissioned by Charles E. Roberts, a patron of Wright's work, the same year Wright worked on an interior remodel of Roberts's house. The building was eventually converted into a residence by Charles E. White, Jr., a Wright-associated architect. Sources vary as to when this occurred but the house was moved from its original location to its present site in 1929. The home is cast in the Tudor Revival style but still displays the architectural thumbprint of Wright's later work.

The building is listed as a contributing property to a federally designated U.S. Registered Historic District.

== History ==
Charles E. Roberts was an engineer, inventor and important early client of Frank Lloyd Wright. Roberts was an influential member of the building committee of Unity Temple in Oak Park. For Roberts, Wright also developed the Quadruple Block Plan of 1900–1903. Some architectural historians have mistakenly identified Charles E. Roberts as the father of Oak Park Studio architect Isabel Roberts. Isabel's father was James H. Roberts of South Bend, Indiana.

In 1896 Charles E. Roberts, an established patron of Frank Lloyd Wright, commissioned two jobs by the architect. One was the Charles E. Roberts House, for which Wright executed an interior remodel, and the other was the Charles E. Roberts Stable. Wright redesigned the structure from an old barn into a garage for Roberts' electric car. The building was eventually converted into a residence by architect Charles E. White, Jr., Roberts' son-in-law and an employee in Wright's studio in the years 1903–1905. Sources greatly vary on the date of White's conversion. The village of Oak Park's landmark nomination form for Wright's other Roberts project, the patron's home, dates White's conversion of the garage into a residence at 1929, the year when the structure was physically moved from its original location to its present location. Historian Thomas O'Gorman, while noting the 1929 move, states that the Wright-redesigned barn conversion was altered into a dwelling between 1903 and 1904. O'Gorman connects White's remodel to the thorough overhaul the building experienced under Wright's creative control.

== Architecture ==
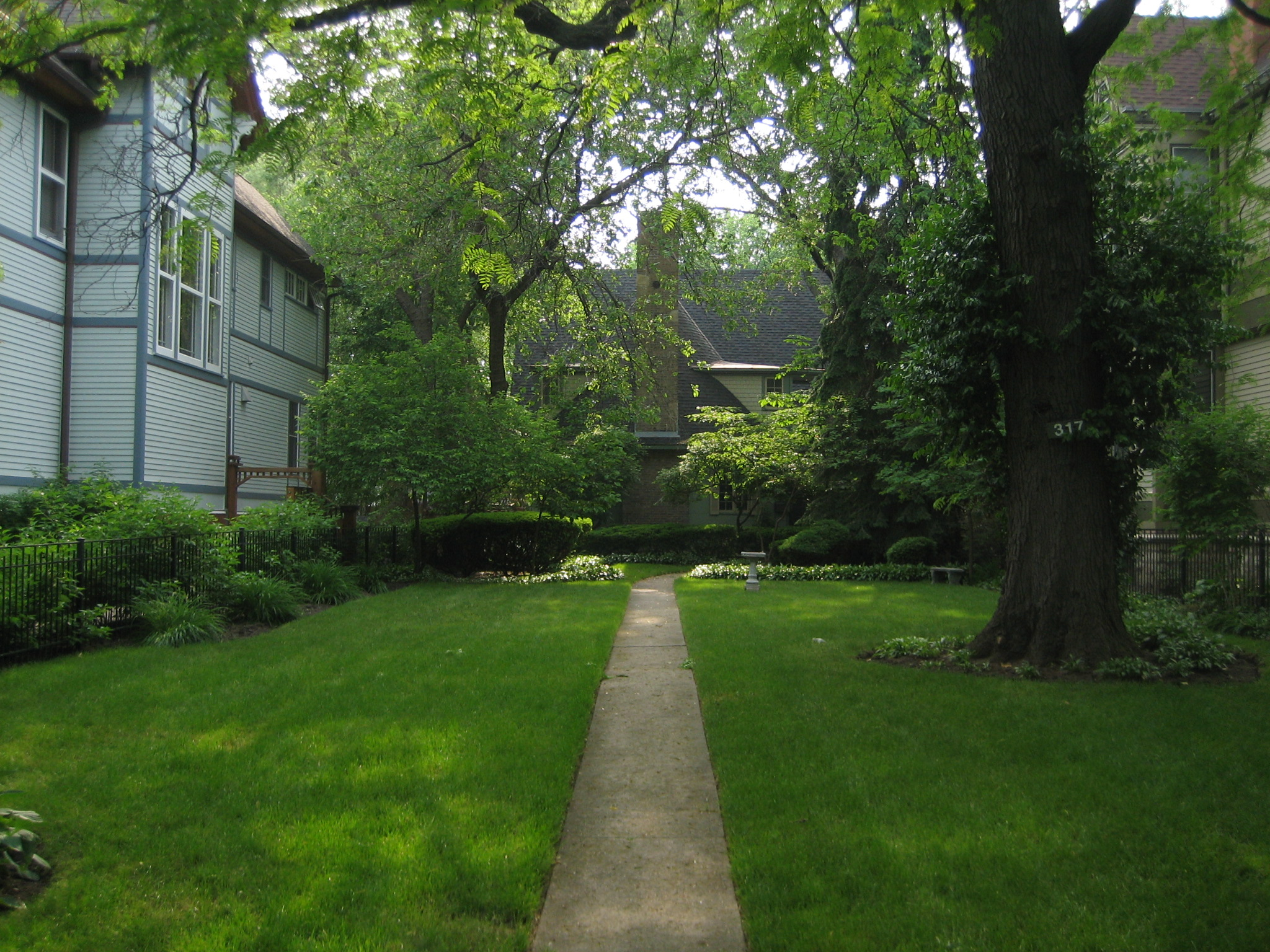
The view of the front (east) elevation is obscured by foliage during warmer months.

The house elicits in its viewer a distinct "English feel." Indeed, through its many remodelings the building is cast in the Tudor Revival style of architecture. The structure displays a steeply pitched, side gabled roof, rounded bay and half-timbering, all common elements of the Tudor Revival style. Other 1890s Wright-designed buildings also displayed a connection to traditional domestic architecture styles. The house has a vertical upsweep which projects a sense of shelter and safety associated with the broad, overhanging eaves found in Wright's roof designs. White carried Wright's design a step further in his remodel, but Wright's architectural aplomb is still evident in the structure.

The home expresses a familial coziness, common to Wright's later early modern Prairie homes. The entire idea of barn conversion was an architectural advance in the late 19th century. Wright's work on the stable introduced angularity and converted it from a barn to a building which conveyed a meld of country charm and modernity. O'Gorman compares the home to those designed by architect Edwin Lutyens. The prominent roof features second-story dormers, and its massive scale is balanced by Wright's placement of towering chimneys at either end of the house. The home's front facade is obscured by bushes, trees and landscaping during the warmer months, and the home is best viewed in autumn or winter.

== Significance ==
The Charles E. Roberts Stable is one of several examples of Wright's work on pre-existing structures found in the village of Oak Park. Other examples include the Peter A. Beachy House and the Hills-DeCaro House, as well as the Roberts House; each of those buildings were pre-existing homes. The building once sat at the rear of the Charles E. Roberts House, a locally designated Oak Park Landmark, today it stands next door to that structure. The stable is listed as a contributing property to the Frank Lloyd Wright-Prairie School of Architecture Historic District. The historic district was listed on the U.S. National Register of Historic Places on December 4, 1973.

== See also ==
- List of Frank Lloyd Wright works
