= Ridgeland–Oak Park Historic District =

Historic district in Illinois, United States

- U.S. National Register of Historic Places
- U.S. Historic district
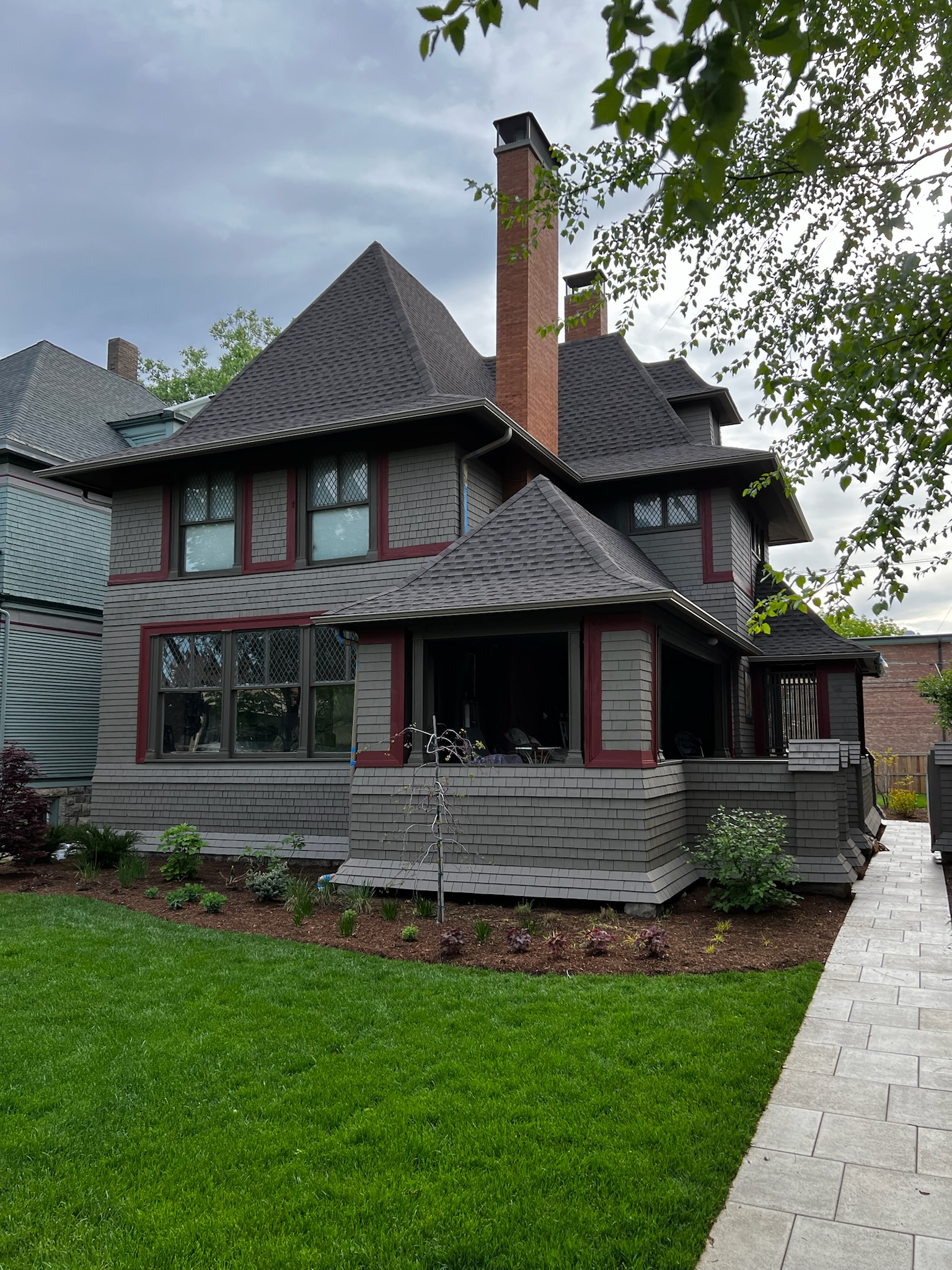
- George W. Smith house, an early Frank Lloyd Wright design

- Location within Illinois Location within the United States
- Location: Roughly bounded by Austin Blvd., Harlem, Ridgeland, and Chicago Aves., Lake and Madison Sts., Oak Park, Illinois
- Coordinates: 41°53′7″N 87°47′18″W
- Area: 539 acres (218 ha)
- Built: 1870
- Architect: multiple
- Architectural style: Prairie School, Bungalow/Craftsman, Late Victorian
- NRHP reference No.: 83003564
- Added to NRHP: December 08, 1983

The Ridgeland–Oak Park Historic District is a historic district in Oak Park, Illinois that was listed on the National Register of Historic Places in 1983. It includes 1558 contributing buildings over 539 acres (218 ha).

The district includes the George W. Smith House, an early example of Frank Lloyd Wright's work as a contributing property. The house is one of two Frank Lloyd Wright–designed buildings within the Ridgeland Historic District (the other being the Unity Temple) and his only residential home in the district. Otherwise, the historic district lacks examples of Wright's full-fledged Prairie style that are found in abundance in the nearby Frank Lloyd Wright-Prairie School of Architecture Historic District.

The district contains many buildings of merit, including the Oak Park Post Office on Lake Street, designed in 1933 by Charles E. White Jr. and his partner Bertram A. Weber, in 1933, and the Art Deco Medical Arts Building, designed by Oak Park architect Roy J. Hotchkiss.
