= Edward R. Hills House =

Historic house in Oak Park, Illinois

- U.S. Historic district – Contributing property
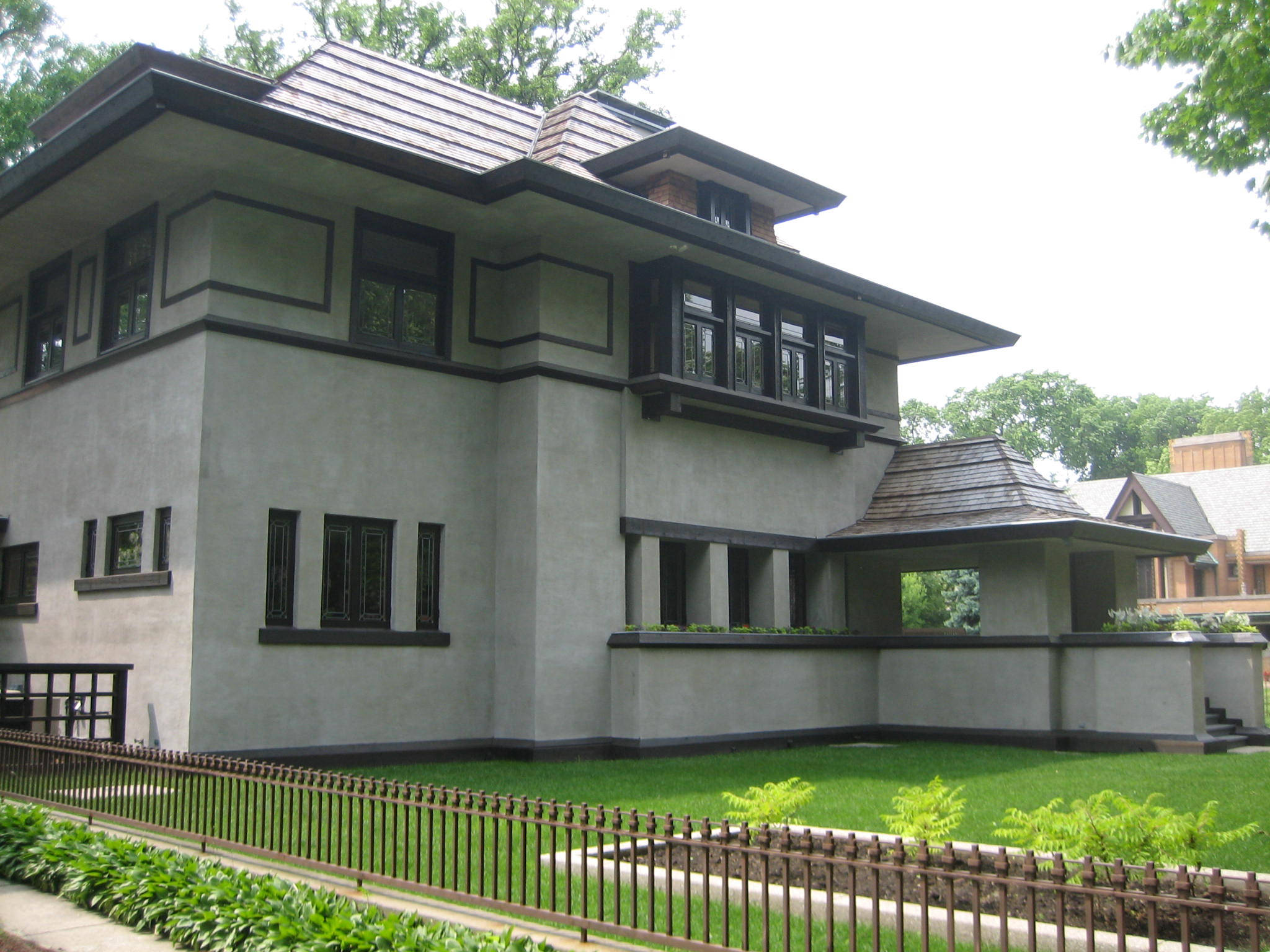

- Location within Illinois Location within the United States
- Location: Oak Park, Cook County, Illinois, USA
- Coordinates: 41°53′32.7″N 87°48′2.3″W
- Built: Construction: 1883; Remodel: 1906; Reconstruction: 1977
- Architect: Frank Lloyd Wright
- Architectural style: Prairie style
- Part of: Frank Lloyd Wright-Prairie School of Architecture Historic District (ID7300069)
- Added to NRHP: December 4, 1973

The Edward R. Hills House, also known as the Hills–DeCaro House, is a residence located at 313 Forest Avenue in Oak Park, a suburb of Chicago, Illinois, United States. It is most notable for a 1906 remodel by architect Frank Lloyd Wright in his signature Prairie style. The Hills–DeCaro House represents the melding of two distinct phases in Wright's career; it contains many elements of both the Prairie style and the designs with which Wright experimented throughout the 1890s. The house is listed as a contributing property to a federal historic district on the U.S. National Register of Historic Places and is a local Oak Park Landmark.

Since construction, the home has undergone many changes. During the 1906 remodel, the original late 19th century Stick style structure was moved and essentially completely rebuilt. Alterations carried out between 1912 and 1965 obscured some of Wright's intended design. In 1976, a major fire destroyed or damaged much of the house. The house was immediately reconstructed and partially restored. This was furthered by another partial restoration by the current home owners. As a result of the remodels, the house today bears the work of at least four different architects. The house remains a private residence, but it is occasionally opened for special tours.

== Early history ==
=== Frank S. Gray House (1883–1900) ===
In 1883, Dr. William Cunningham Gray commissioned architect Charles C. Miller to build the house which would eventually become the present Hills–DeCaro House on two lots along Forest Avenue. Gray was a prominent professional writer and publisher and was the grandfather of famed Prairie School architect, William Gray Purcell. The three-story, Stick style home featured tall sash windows topped by bracketed hoods, a covered porch which extended across the front façade, and flared gables filled with decorative, fan-shaped trusses (Historic photo of the exterior prior to 1906). The first and second floor each contained four principle rooms around a stair hall in the northeast corner. Dr. Gray sold the house to his son Frank Sherwood Gray, but William Gray was again the owner by 1898.

=== Relocation and remodel (1900–1907) ===
Diagram showing the development of the Moore estate and moving of the Gray house.

Two years later in 1900, the Gray house changed hands again. It was purchased by attorney Nathan Grier Moore, the owner of the large residence on two lots to the immediate north. As stated in his autobiography, Moore intended to remodel the adjacent house as a future wedding present for his eldest daughter, Mary. Frank Lloyd Wright, whom Moore had previously contracted to design his own house in 1895 (see also Nathan G. Moore House), was soon commissioned to carry out the redesign work. The 1900 date on an early set of architectural drawings indicate that Wright began work on the project immediately. However, any thought of construction would have to wait, as complications with the land title delayed the total transfer of the property until 1903. In 1905, Moore acquired another house to the south of the Gray house which had been previously owned by D.L. McDaniels. This final purchase expanded Moore's Forest Avenue frontage to 250 feet (72.6 m), and was the last necessary piece of his plan. The following year, Moore had the McDaniels house demolished. The Gray house moved south and rotated counterclockwise ninety degrees to take its place. Once it was sited in its present-day location, Wright assigned draftsman Barry Byrne to oversee the remodel of the home.

== Wright's design ==
Floor layouts in 1906.

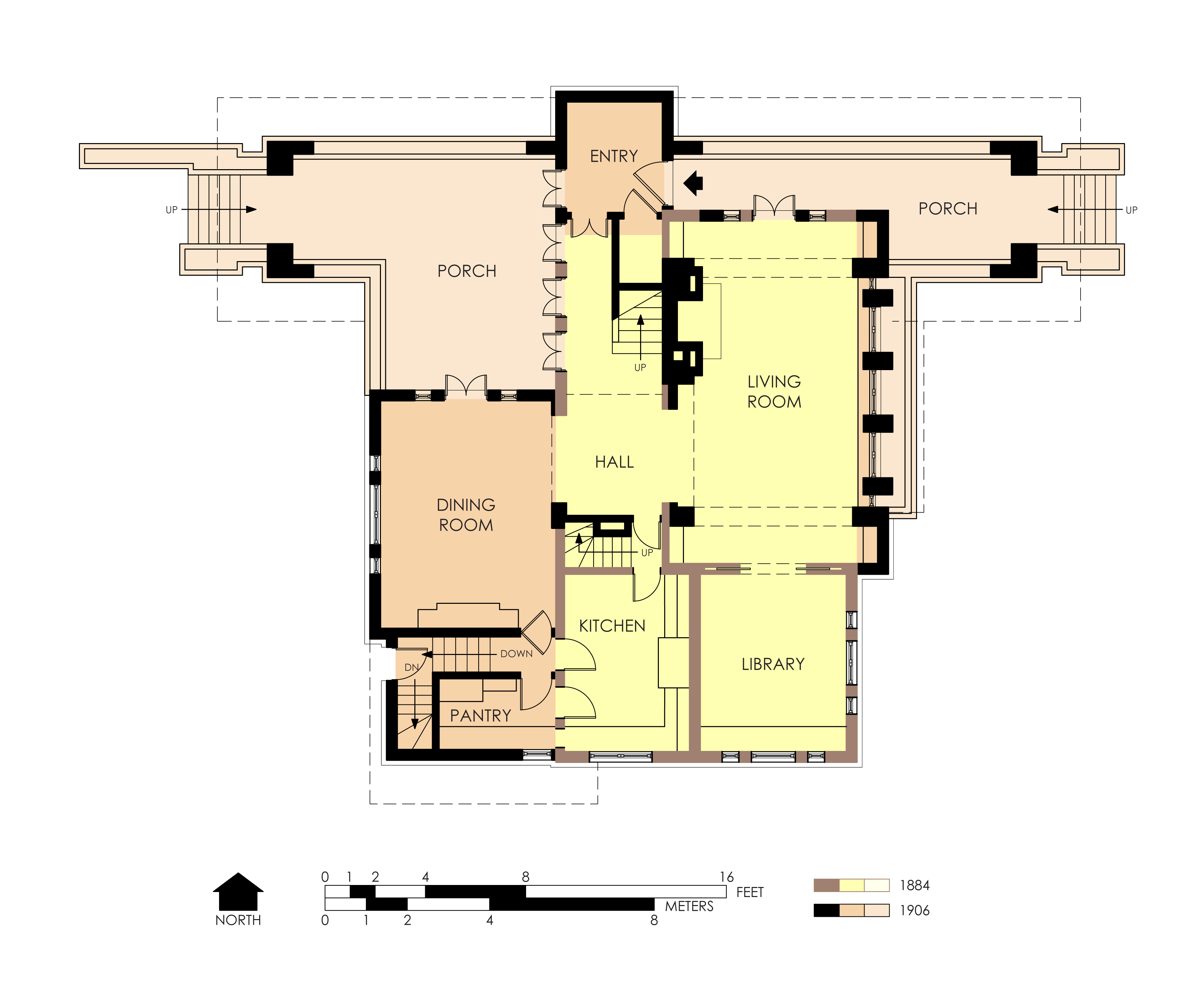
First floor plan

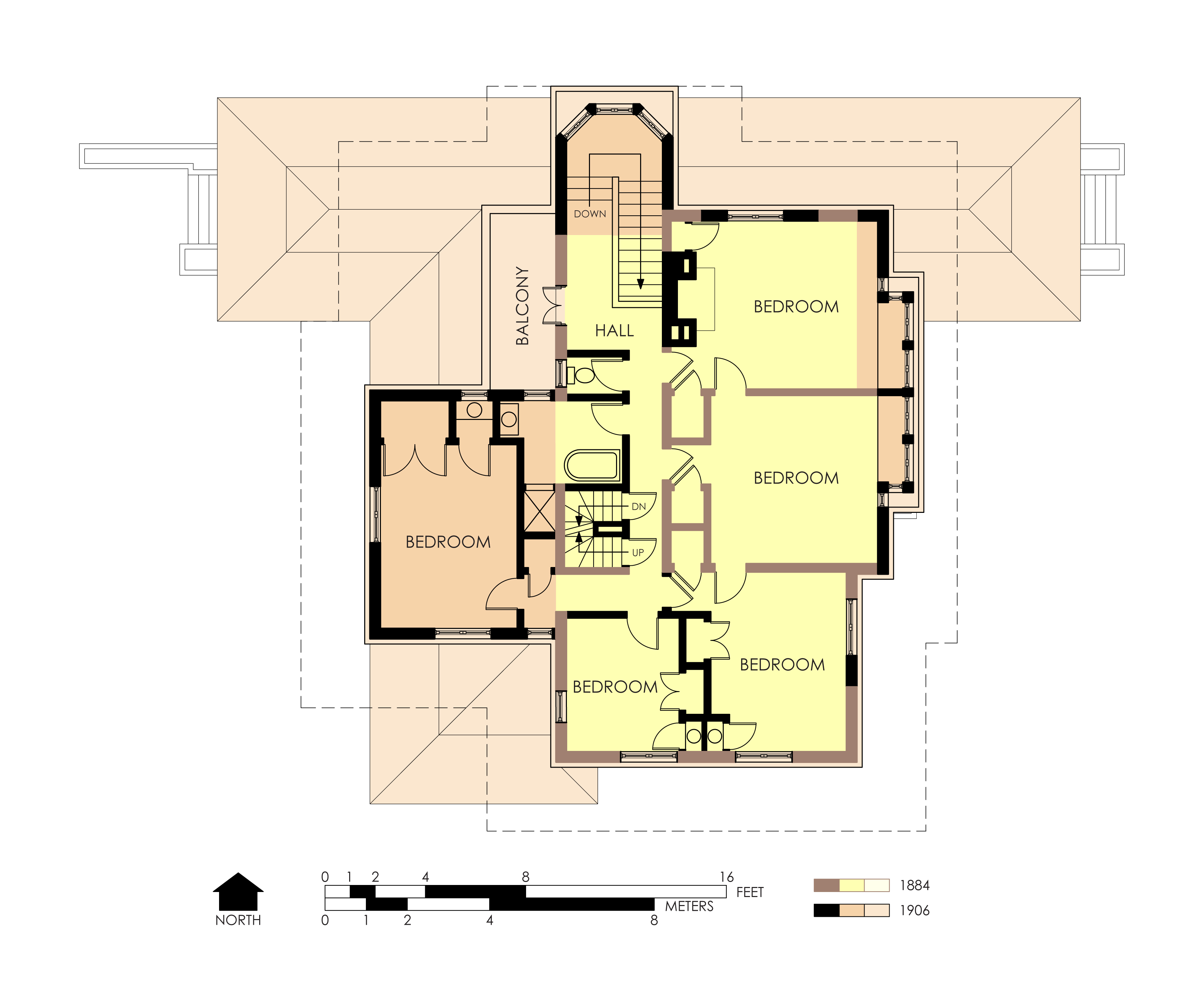
Second floor plan

Wright's design for the repositioned home – now in its third revision – utilized the Gray home foundation and framing for several walls and floors but otherwise entirely engulfed the original building. The existing stair hall was retained and extended to serve as the central circulation spine for the first and second levels. As a result of turning the structure during the move, the hall was made to traverse the lot from side to side, or from north to south. This unusual orientation inconspicuously placed the front door halfway down the north elevation instead of directly facing the street. The first floor hall was divided into three sections; a small vestibule inside the entrance was followed by a narrow passageway lined by French doors on one side which terminated in an open space with broad doorways into each of the home's principle rooms. Of these, the living room, library and kitchen were carved out of the original house, while a rear addition housed a dining room and pantry. Two staircases – one a wide, open, public stair in the central hall, and the other a narrow, winding, and closed service stair – connected the first and second floors. The second floor contained five bedrooms around a single hall bathroom. A finished third story, accessed by the tight service stair, contained two servant bedrooms and a second bathroom. All in all, the remodeling and expansions brought the house to a gross floor area of approximately 1800 square feet (170 m^{2}) on the first floor 1600 square feet (150 m^{2}) on the second.

The interior rooms were finished in keeping with the Prairie style. Walls and ceiling were plastered with ample oak trim throughout on both surfaces. Floors in most rooms were also of oak. Large Roman brick fireplaces dominate the living room and master bedroom. As with most of his houses, Frank Lloyd Wright designed several built-in furnishings, including oak radiator covers, bookshelves in the library and living room, and a china cabinet with glass doors in the dining room.

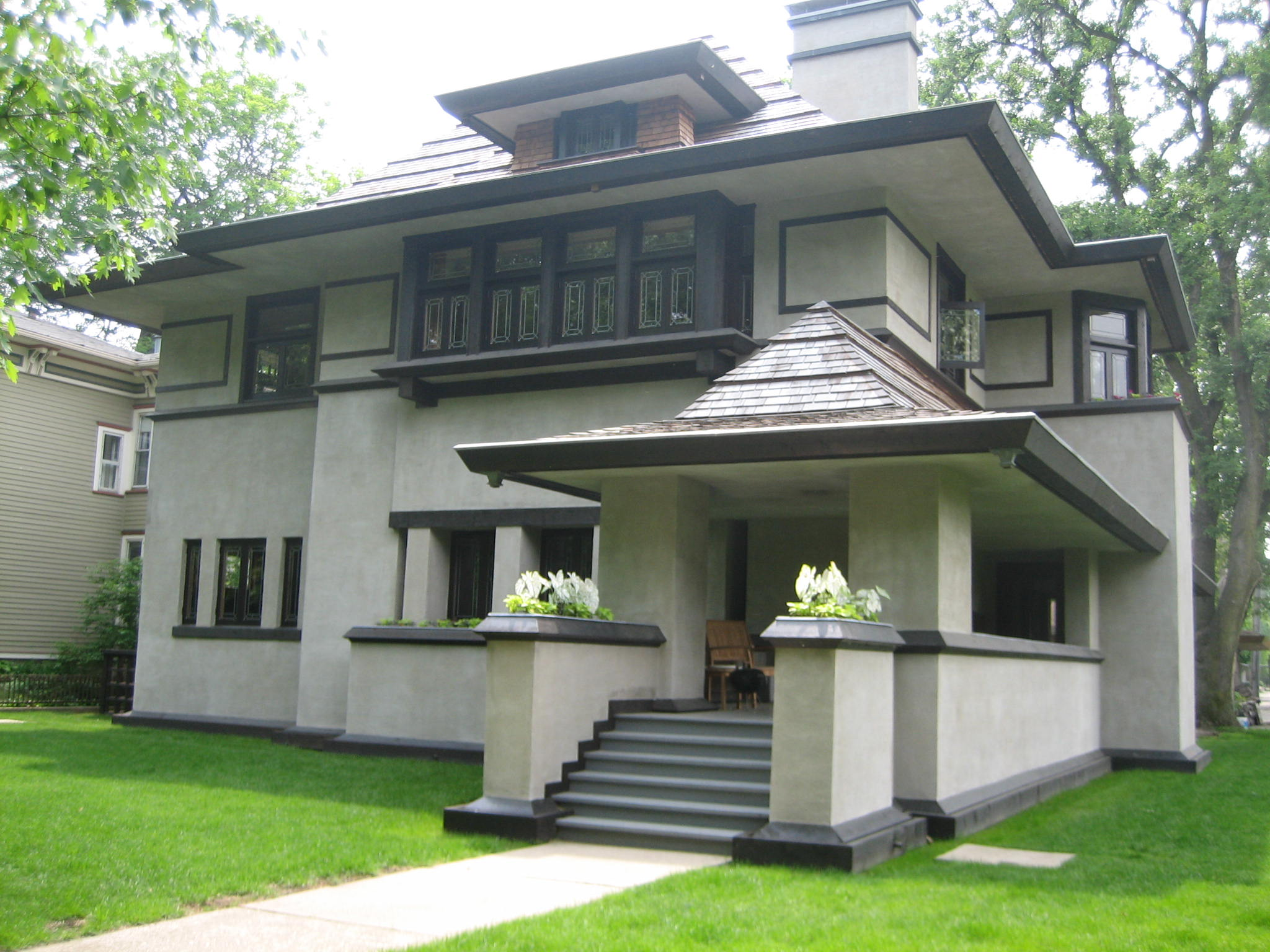
The bay window and pagoda-style dormer are prominent elements of the east façade of the Hills–DeCaro House.

On the exterior, Frank Lloyd Wright traded the dual-pitched, cross-gable roof in the Stick style for a more distinctive dual-pitched hip roof with deep eaves and thick wood fascia boards. The form and style of the roof exemplified Wright's Japanese influence, and has been likened to the design of Asian pagodas. The unique design was furthered by a tierred surface of cedar shingles created by furring strips under every fifth row. Three dormers – one each on the east, south, and west façades – were likewise faced in shingles and were topped by the same flared, double-pitched roofs.

Existing and new walls, alike, were covered in uniform, lightly textured, pale stucco from the ground up to – and including – the eave soffit. A continuous canted ledge of painted redwood stretched around the house below the second floor windows. Additional redwood trim was employed in rectangles to wrap around each corner on the second floor. All windows and doors in the home were fashioned in leaded glass with nickel caming. The unvarying glass pattern was a variation of the typical Prairie muntin bar design and consisted of a frame of narrow rectangular and trapezoidal panes surrounding a single large glass pane. Wright arranged most windows into one of two ensembles – one for each floor – to unify his design. In five locations on the first floor, double casement windows or full length French doors were flanked by two more isolated, narrow casements. All openings on the second floor were composed of paired casements topped by a single transom light. A cantilevered, rectangular bay, which formed a focal point on the second level of the street (east) elevation, contained a band of four such three-piece windows and was subtly bookended by two deeply inset casements.

The remodel brought ample exterior space to the house. Matching porches extended into the front and rear yard on either side of the north-facing, vertical entry and stair tower. Both porches were terminated in a broad stair between elongated planting piers. Aside from additional planters below the living room window and outside the stairway window, the yard was simply landscaped. A low concrete wall topped by a similarly short wrought iron fence was incorporated sometime after construction to enclose the yard along the south and east lot lines. This fence continued along the eastern edge of Nathan Moore's property to the corner of Forest Avenue and Superior Street. The sidewalk at the front entrance was demarcated by Roman brick piers topped by glass-globed light fixtures. The yard additionally featured an original ticket booth from the 1893 World's Columbian Exposition which Moore had purchased and relocated to the site.

== Post–remodeling ==
=== Hills ownership and alterations (1907–1965) ===
Although construction was completed sometime in late 1906 or early 1907, Nathan Moore's daughter did not move in right away. In fact, Mary was not wed to lawyer Edward Rowland Hills until January 1908. Instead, two successive families rented the house from Moore. The Hills resided at 335 Superior Street, a house located north of the Moore House until sometime in 1911 or 1912.

Floor layouts prior to 1976 fire.

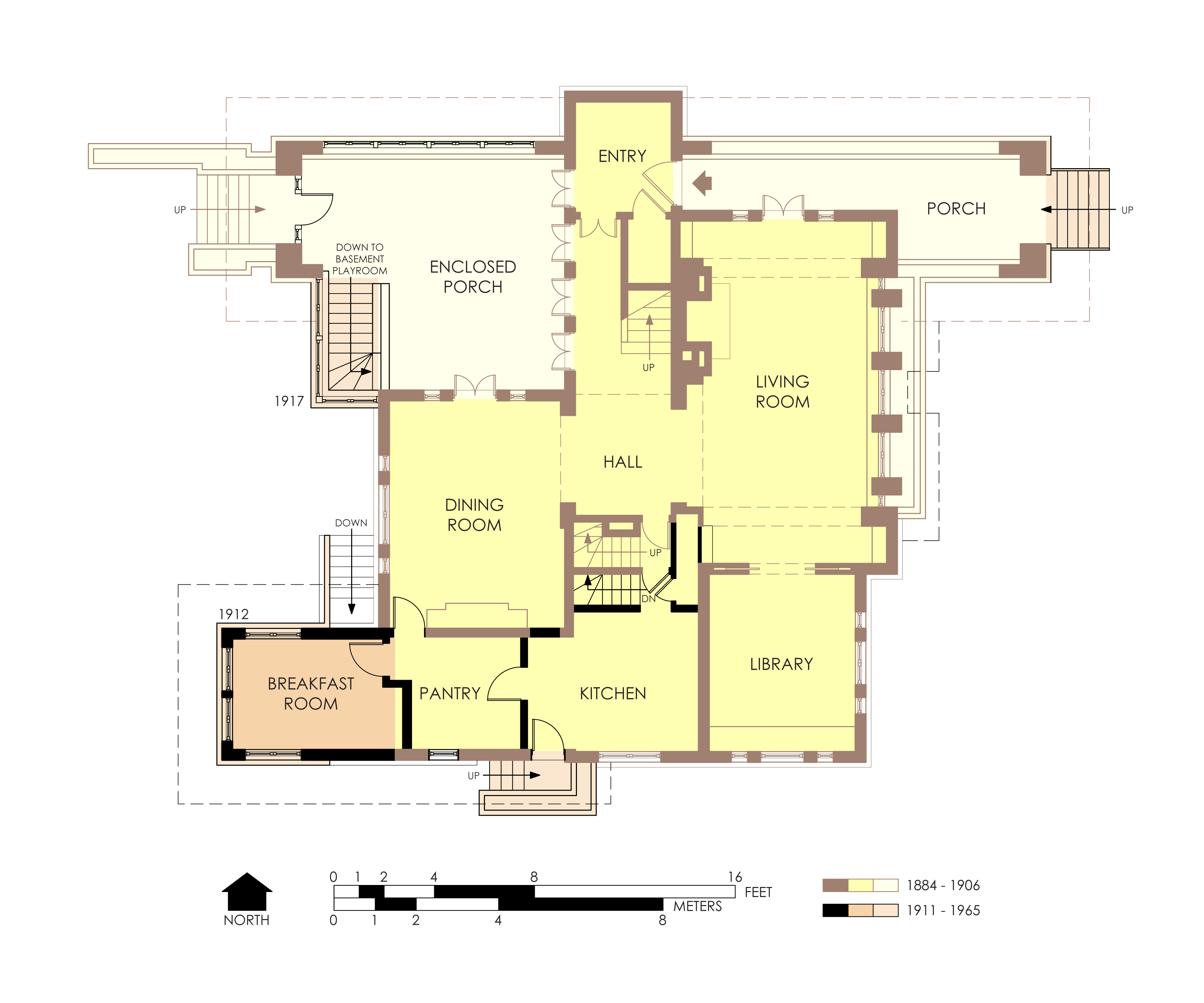
First floor plan

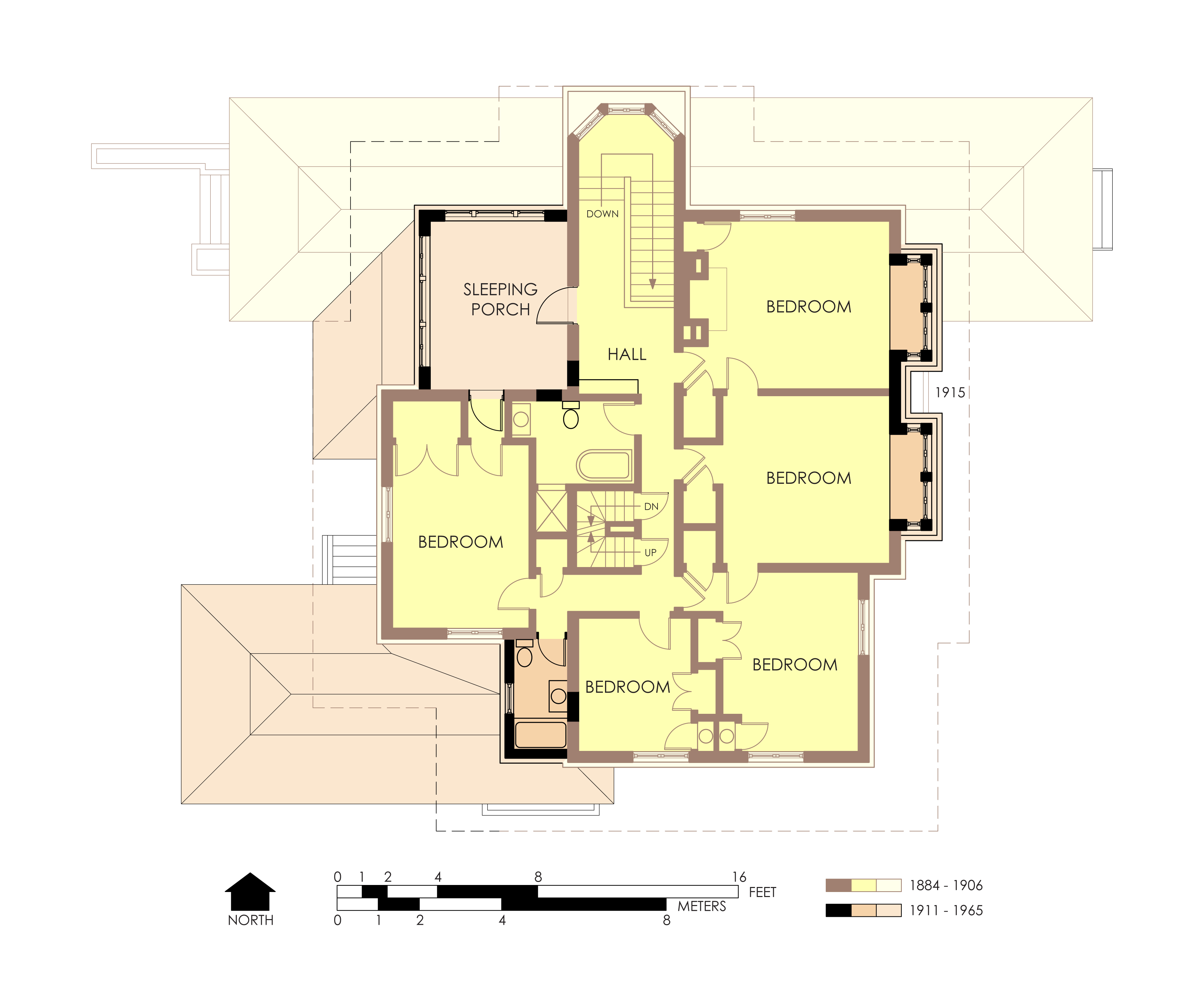
Second floor plan

Mary Hills was not particularly fond of her wedding gift. First, Wright was not commissioned to design furniture for the Hills; according to their eldest of five sons, John Moore Hills, they felt that "it was their house and they would furnish it for their own taste and comfort." Sibling Nathan Grier further related that his mother found the entire house too "stern and austere" and she immediately hired neighborhood architect Henry Fiddelke to make alterations. Over the next eight years, the rear kitchen wing was extended with the addition of a pantry and breakfast room (c. 1912), the rear porch was enclosed with glass (c. 1917), a second bathroom was inserted above the kitchen, and a small second floor balcony was enlarged and covered to form a sleeping porch. The space under the rear porch was excavated to form a children's playroom and billiards room. Most notably, the second floor front (east) bay window – which was initially split between two bedrooms – was reconstructed as two separate bay windows in 1915. In later alterations, the cedar shingle roof was replaced by asphalt shingles which failed to replicate the distinctive tiered pattern. Also, the front porch was expanded and piers on either side of the front steps were replaced by simple iron handrails. (see floor plans at right for details on the alterations)

When Nathan Moore had split his property in 1910, he deeded the southern 60 feet (18.3 m) of his original 250 feet (76 m) of Forest Avenue frontage to his daughter. Since the two yards remained contiguous, the fact that the dividing lot line was tight up against the side of the Hills House posed no problem. However, in 1946, Nathan Moore died and his estate passed to the Hills family. Mary and Edward sold the Moore house the next year, but retained an additional 40 feet (12.2 m) of land to provide space for a side yard and garden north of their home. Following her husband's death in 1953, Mary Hills continued to reside in the house until she sold it and moved to an apartment in 1965.

=== Fire and reconstruction (1975–1977) ===
In 1975, Tom and Irene DeCaro purchased the house and began a diligent restoration with the aid of architect John Tilton. However, work was abruptly halted in 1976 when a fire devastated much of the structure. Cleaning fluids and paint fumes ignited by an electric sander on the second floor were determined to be the cause of the blaze. Irene DeCaro was injured in the fire when she returned to the burning home to search for her pet cat. The entire second and third floors were completely destroyed and the first floor was badly damaged. Despite the extensive destruction, several of the first floor built-in furnishings and both fireplaces survived the fire.

Floor layouts after the 1977 reconstruction.

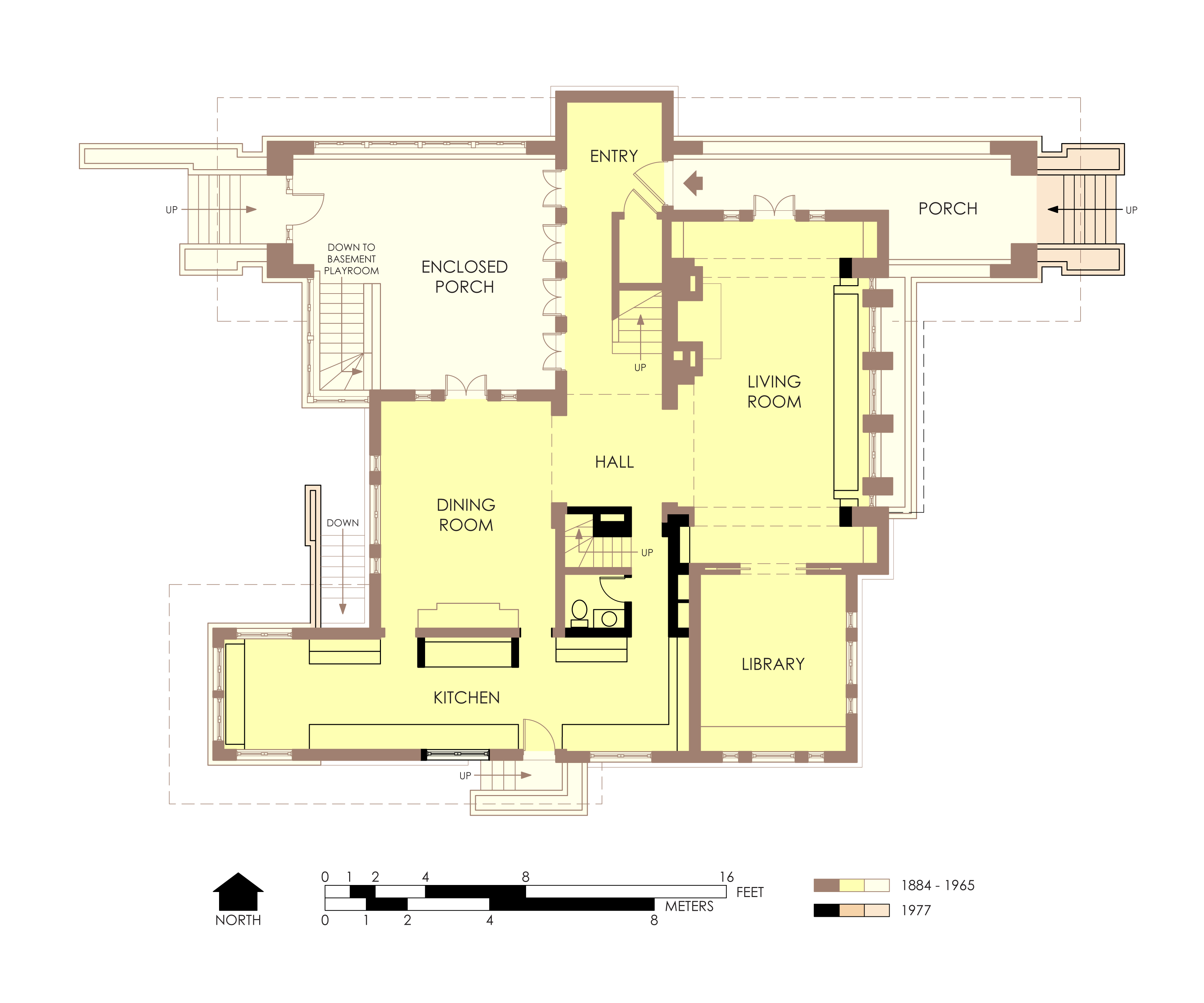
First floor plan

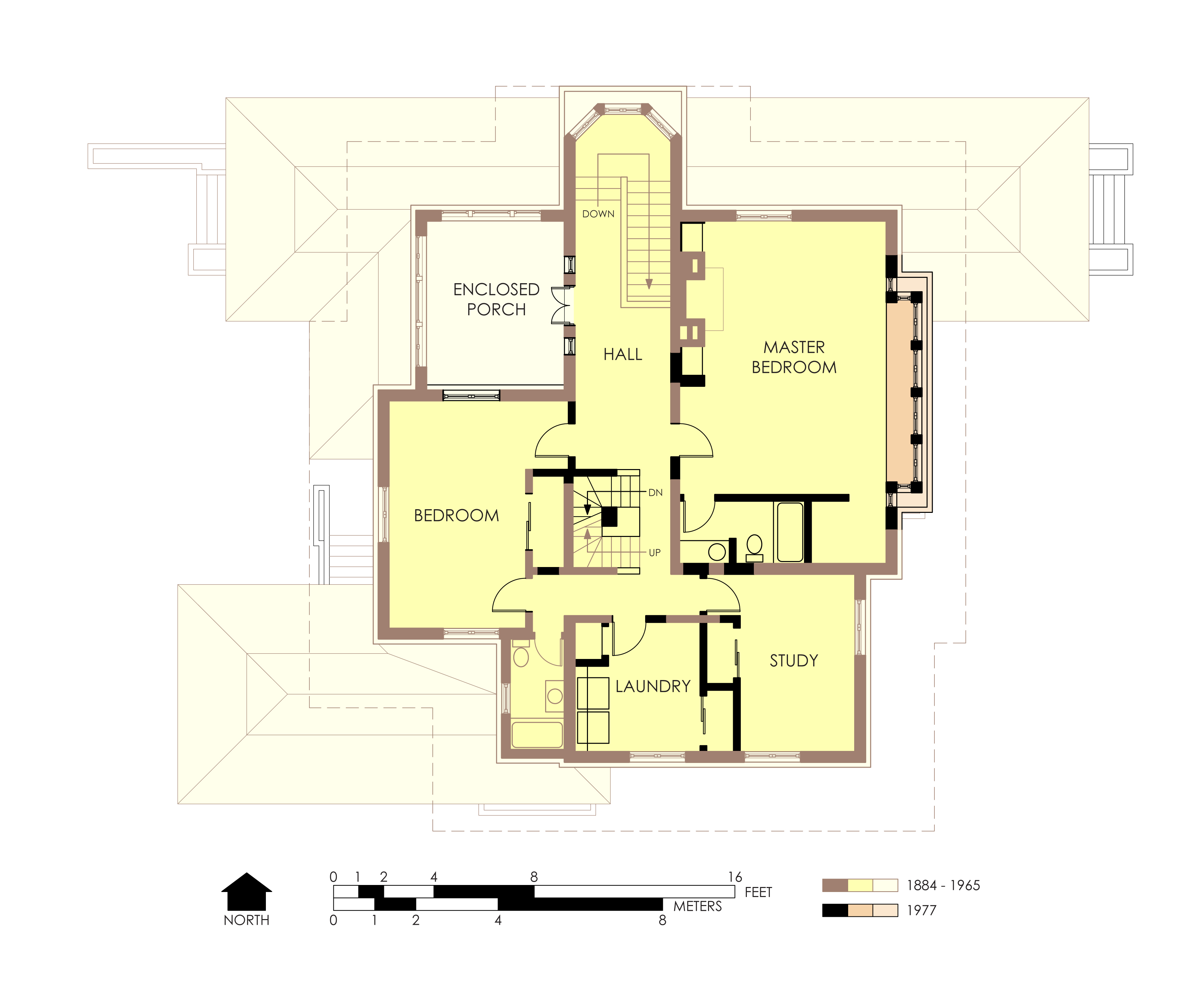
Second floor plan

Following a neighborhood fundraiser in May 1976, Mr. and Mrs. DeCaro resumed their extensive reconstruction. The restoration returned the front elevation to its 1906 design yet retained most alterations made by the Hills towards the rear, including the enclosed porches and enlarged kitchen wing. In cases where blueprints differed from historic photographs, the owners chose to follow Wright's plans. For instance, the main chimney was known to have always been exposed brick, yet was stuccoed in the reconstruction per Wright's original plans. Inside, some changes were made to accommodate the DeCaro's modern lifestyle. On the main level, an updated kitchen replaced the breakfast room and pantry. On the second floor, several walls were moved to widen the hallway and to create a master suite in place of two front bedrooms (see post-reconstruction plans at right). On the third floor tight servants quarters were exchanged for a single bedroom suite. For their part in the restoration, the Oak Park Landmarks Commission voted in 1977 to rename the completed structure as the Hills-DeCaro House.

=== 1977 to present ===
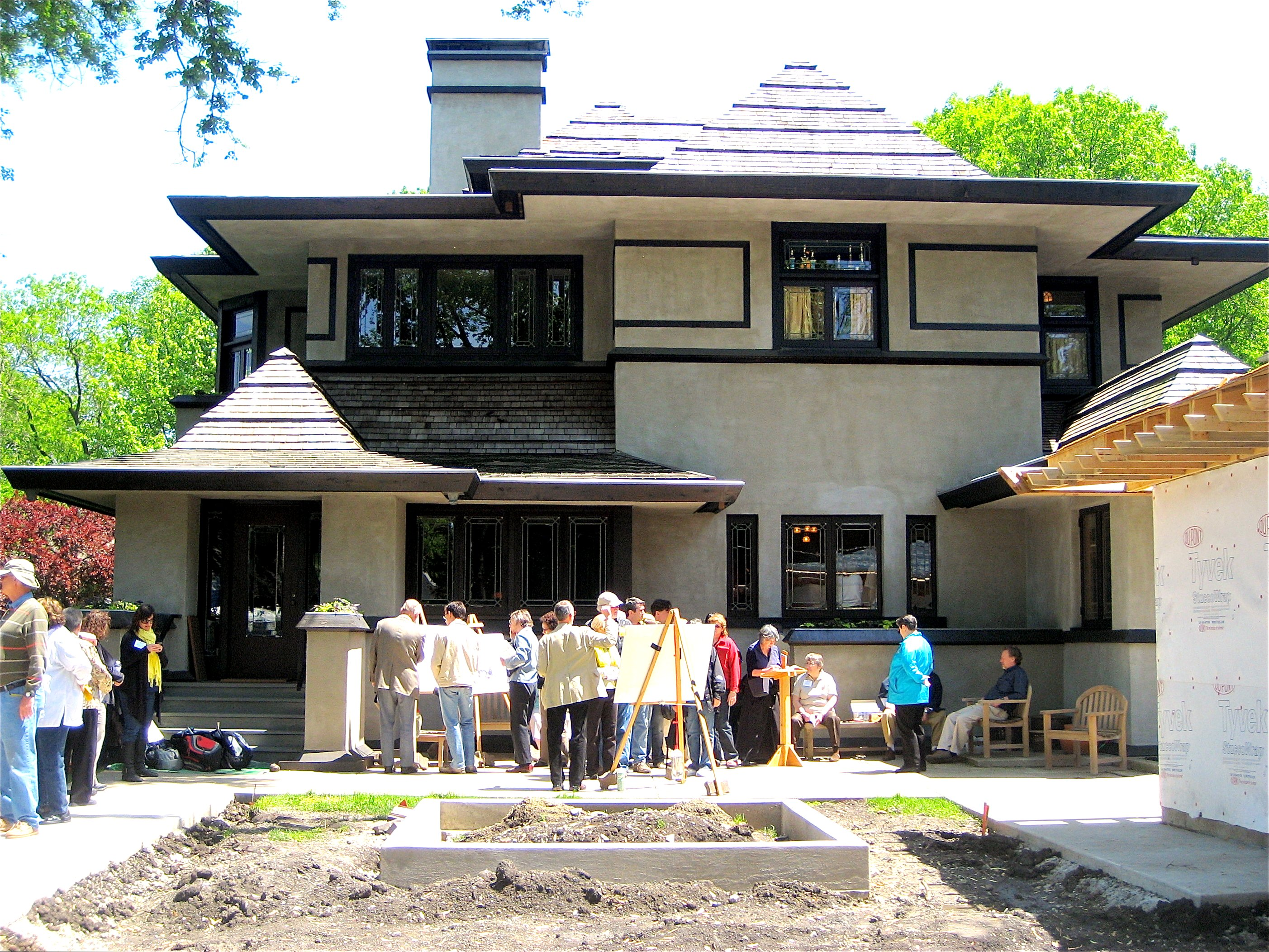
The rear (west) face of the home showing the 2009 yard renovations. Several alterations made by the Hills are also visible.

Following the DeCaros, the house passed through three owners before it was purchased by Mark and Sallie Smylie in 2001. The Smylies hired Von Dreele-Freerksen Construction for restoration and remodeling work of the interior and exterior. On the interior, the modern kitchen and main floor bath were remodeled to match the style of the other ground floor rooms. In the basement level, the floors were lowered to increase ceiling height and stone foundation walls from the 1884 house were re-exposed. Outside, previous owners had installed a wood band below the first floor to match the ledge on the second floor, had capped some of the exterior planters, and had again replaced the cedar roof with asphalt shingles. All of these historically inaccurate modifications were reversed. Additionally, trim and stucco were sampled to reveal the original exterior colors. The determined paint scheme consisted of off-white stucco and wood trim in dark "creosote" brown.

On January 7, 2002, the Hills-DeCaro House was declared a landmark by the Village of Oak Park. The residence had already been listed as a contributing property to the Frank Lloyd Wright-Prairie School of Architecture Historic District.

In early 2009, the Smylies embarked on their most significant exterior project. Records at Taliesin showed plans for a long pergola and pavilion which would have spanned between the Nathan G. Moore House conservatory and the northwest corner of the Hills-DeCaro House backyard. Further research yielded a period photograph which proved the structure's existence. Subsequent digging uncovered the limestone foundation for the pavilion. The Smylies and Von Dreel-Freerksen set about recreating the pavilion and the first section of the pergola (the portion which falls within the property lines of the Hills DeCaro House). Roman bricks for the new construction were matched to remnants found near the buried foundations. As part of the project, a large modern garage built in 1978 was replaced by a smaller, more historically sympathetic garage. In August 2025, the Smylies placed the Hills–DeCaro House for sale, the first time in 24 years that it had been on the market. The family had tentatively agreed to sell the house within days of placing it for sale.

== Comparison to other Wright works ==
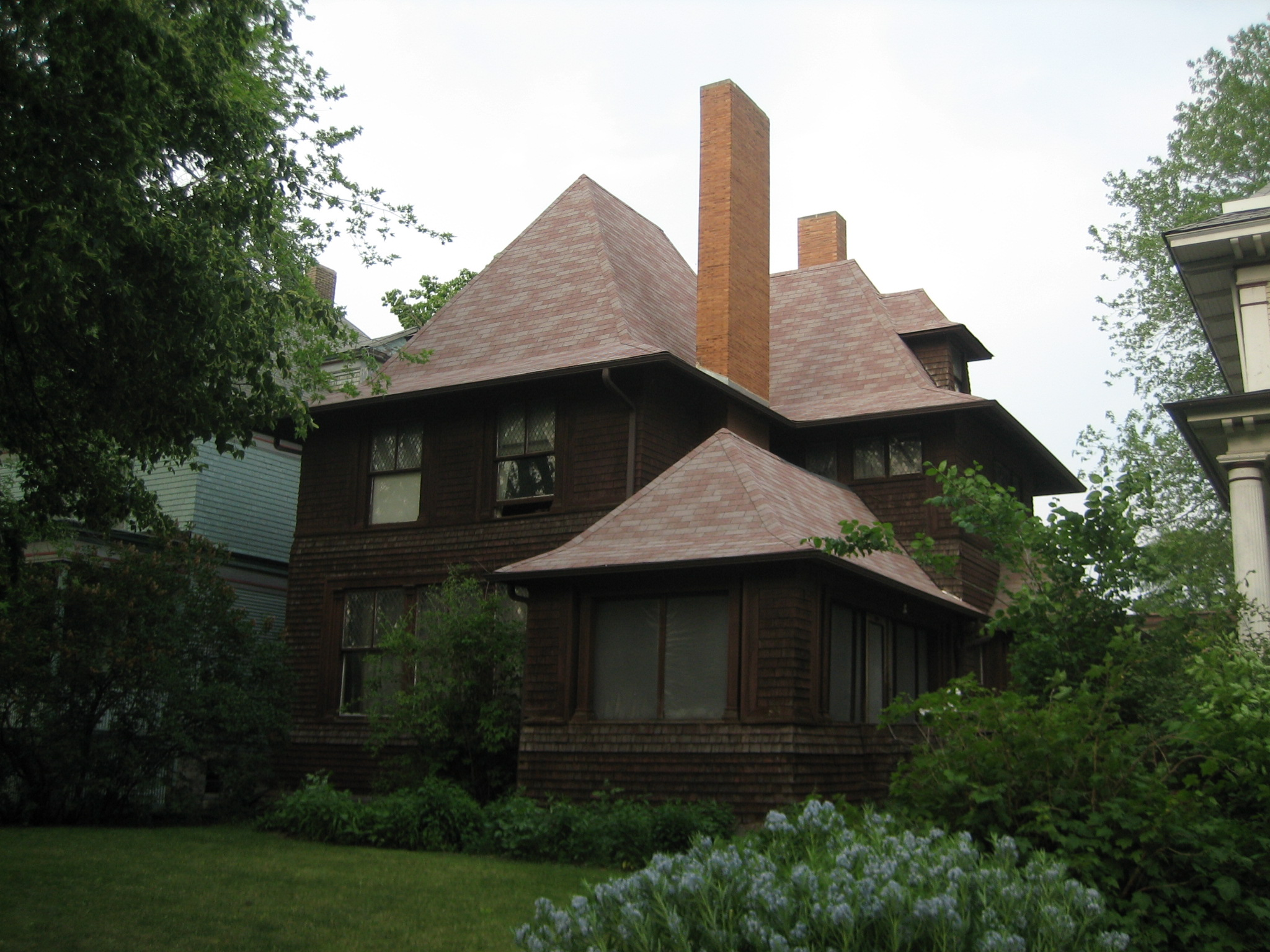
Although stylistically different, the Hills-DeCaro house has much the same massing and roof form as the 1896 George W. Smith House shown above.

The Hills-DeCaro House is most significant for its architecture which represents the transition and integration of Wright's early experimental style and his mature Prairie style. Among features which reference his earlier designs are the windows; instead of the elaborate, geometric art-glass patterns which Wright first introduced in the Frank W. Thomas House, Wright employs simpler leaded frames with clear glass. The design is most similar to that of the Robert G. Emmond House or the wood muntin configuration of the Thomas H. Gale House, two of Wright's first works. Additionally, the house has a finished basement and attic, both of which Wright would avoid whenever possible following the development of his Prairie house.

Elements which are purely Prairie in style include the extensive use of stucco contrasted with dark wood banding. Several later works, such as the Stephen M. B. Hunt House and Robert W. Evans House share similar detail work and employ the same rectangular frames at each corner. The horizontal emphasis created by this banding, as well as the deep overhangs and window groupings is also a hallmark of the Prairie style. The arrangement of rooms in the first floor of the Hills House and extended porches are evocative of the pinwheel shape found in the Ward W. Willits House, Darwin D. Martin House and other works. As Wright broke away from the conventional, rectangular floor plans with the development of his Prairie homes, the hidden entrance also became more common and can be found in nearly every one of his Prairie houses.

One component which epitomizes the transitional nature of the Hills-DeCaro House is the dual-pitched, Japanese inspired roof which recalls similar roof designs for the Harry C. Goodrich House and George W. Smith House, both completed ten years prior. However, the cantilevered eaves of the Hills-Decaro house are even deeper – stretching 5.5 feet (1.67 m) on the upper story – and the fascia is even thicker than those of its early predecessors. When paired with the unique, stepped shingle pattern, these adjustments further accentuate the Prairie style horizontality of the house.

== Other Wright house remodels in Oak Park ==
- 1894 Dr. H. W. Bassett House (demolished 1922)
- 1895 Harrison R. Young House
- 1896 Charles E. Roberts House
- 1896 Charles E. Roberts Stable
- 1906 Peter A. Beachy House
- 1909 William H. Copeland House
- 1922 Nathan G. Moore Residence (original house had also been designed by Wright in 1895)

== See also ==
- List of Frank Lloyd Wright works

== Notes ==
†	Given nonconsecutive page numbering, any given page numbers refer to the page within the PDF instead of the number displayed on that page.
