= Nathan G. Moore House =

Historic house in Oak Park, Illinois

- U.S. Historic district – Contributing property

- Location within Illinois Location within the United States
- Interactive map showing the Moore House
- Location: 333 Forest Ave. Oak Park, Cook County, Illinois, United States
- Coordinates: 41°53′34.6″N 87°48′2.6″W
- Built: Construction: 1895; Alteration: 1923
- Architect: Frank Lloyd Wright
- Architectural style: Tudor Revival
- Part of: Frank Lloyd Wright-Prairie School of Architecture Historic District (ID7300069)
- Added to NRHP: December 4, 1973

The Nathan G. Moore House, also known as the Moore-Dugal Residence, is a home at 333 Forest Avenue in Oak Park, a suburb of Chicago, Illinois, United States. It was designed by Frank Lloyd Wright and is one block south of Wright's home and studio. It was originally completed in 1895 in the Tudor Revival style at the request of client Nathan Moore. Wright obliged his client's wishes, but long after disliked the house for its adherence to historical styles.

A 1922 fire gave Wright the opportunity to redesign the house. The structure was completely rebuilt above the first or lowest floor in a manner in keeping with Wright's other works of the late 1910s and early 1920s. While the new design stayed evocative of Tudor architecture, the house was heavily ornamented by details of Sullivanesque, Mayan, and other exotic origins. Wright's second scheme remains largely intact today and the house continues to be a private residence despite a brief period as a tour home.

== History ==
In 1886, Nathan Grier Moore bought a small, wood-framed house on a 50 feet by 150 feet lot at the southwestern corner of Forest Avenue and Superior Street. Moore had been born in 1853 in Cherry Tree, Pennsylvania and had attended law school in La Crosse, Wisconsin. He had recently been hired into the office of Chicago attorney John P. Wilson. However, Moore chose to reside in Oak Park with his wife Anna and first daughter Mary (born in 1883) instead of Chicago. The couple's second daughter, Marjorie, was born in 1889 while they lived in their first Oak Park house.

=== First Wright design ===
Nathan Moore purchased the neighboring lot to the south in 1891 after the previous house on that site had been destroyed by fire. He soon announced his intention to build a new home on his expanded property. Frank Lloyd Wright accounted in his autobiography that Moore had been approached by many architects, including Norman S. Patton, before Wright himself was asked to design the project in 1894. Mr. and Mrs. Moore reportedly traveled to Wright's newly opened downtown Chicago studio in the Schindler Building to request his services rather than simply calling at the emerging architect's house across the street.

Moore had apparently not come to Wright in admiration of his design style. According to Wright, he proclaimed that "I don't want you to give us anything like the house you did for Winslow" referring to the recently completed house that Wright had designed for William Winslow in River Forest, Illinois. "I don't want to go down backstreets to my morning train to avoid being laughed at." Moore then proceeded to show Wright pictures of English half-timber buildings as inspiration for the proposed dwelling. Wright was apprehensive to design a house in a historical style, but he accepted the commission because of his financial obligations to his family (as he said, his "three children were now running around the streets without proper shoes").

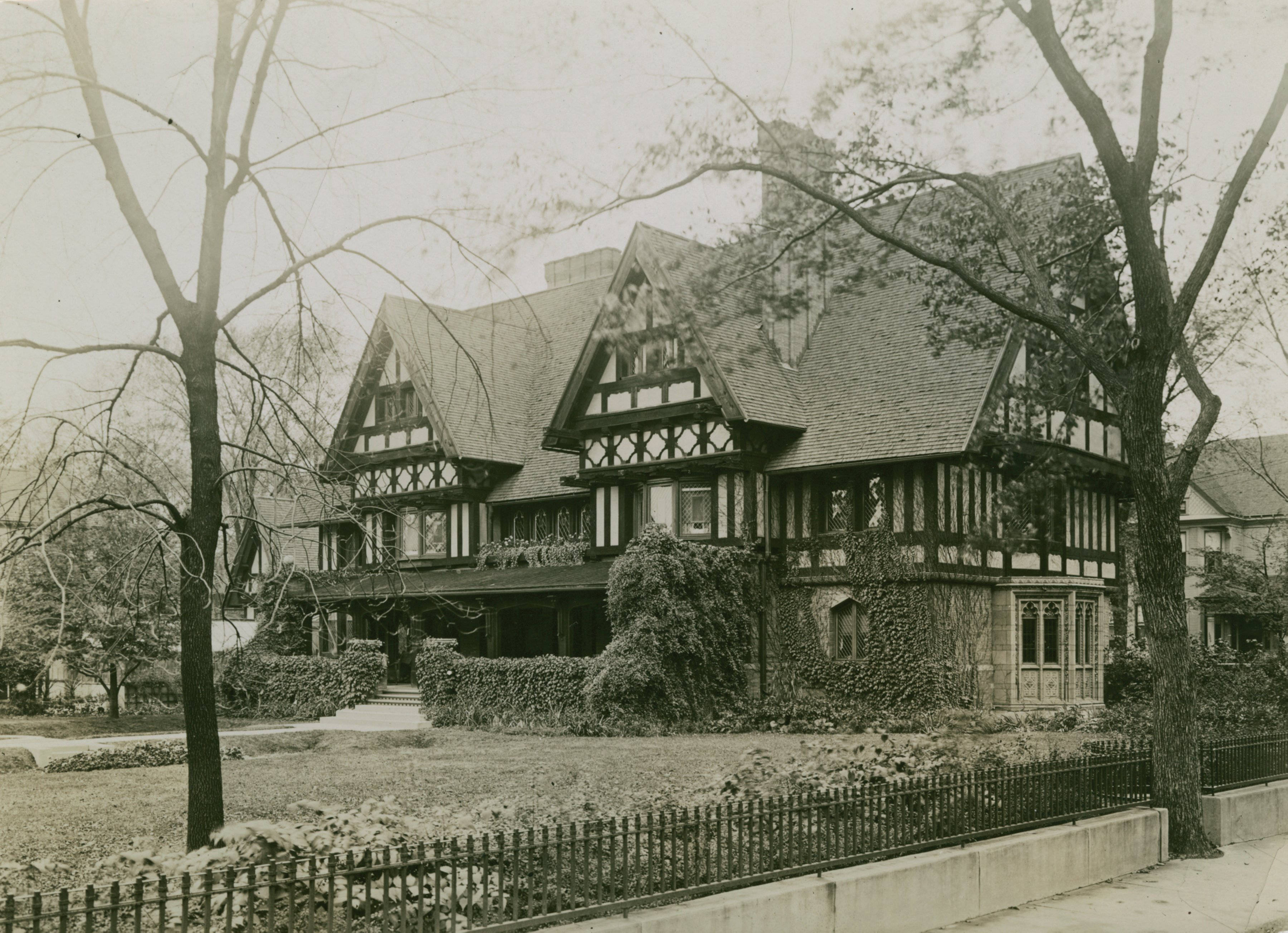
The Moore House as originally built

The first plan proposed a remodel of the home Moore had bought in 1886. Plans changed and the existing structure was instead moved three lots west to front Superior Street. This made way for the construction of a three-story Tudor Revival house which was completed in 1895. The three-story structure was built tight against the northern lot line which allowed for maximum yard space to the south. Walls on the main floor were faced in golden-tan Roman brick while the upper floors were finished in typical, dark-stained half timbering over light stucco. A steep, gabled roof and two slender, tall, brick chimneys topped off the composition. The main house was symmetrically proportioned with few exceptions – including the chimneys and window openings flanking the Superior Street entrance. A garage connected the residence to a garden house at the northwestern corner of the property. Wright also designed a matching stable building across an alley to the southwest. The interior was paneled in dark wood yet was amply lit by bands of diamond-patterned, leaded casement windows which opened the rooms up to the south garden. Inside also featured eight fireplaces, each with unique custom surrounds. (See more period images of the first Moore House).

Nathan and Anna Moore "were delighted with the house." Unfortunately the same cannot have been said for Wright. He came to regard the design with embarrassment and admitted that his "heart wasn't in it." His decision caused further regret after he was asked on more than one occasion to devise similar Tudor inspired houses for other clients. Like his mentor and former employer, Louis H. Sullivan, Wright considered the copying of historic styles to be "uncreative" and completely contrary to American freedom. Even so, Wright managed to work a few interpretive deviations into the design of the Moore House. These included a broad, south-facing porch complete with brick end piers, Sullivanesque details on the balustrades, and his signature bowl-shaped urns. "It was the first time...an English, half-timbered house ever saw a porch," Wright stated and further conceded that "the porch was becoming to the house."

=== Property expansion and Edward R. Hills House ===
Soon after the new house was finished, Moore resumed the expansion of his property. In 1900 he bought the house on a 100 ft wide lot to the south from prior owner William C. Gray. That same year, Wright was rehired to remodel this recent purchase for Moore's eldest daughter. Actual construction waited until yet another house was acquired south of the former Gray house in 1905. This last house had been owned by a Mr. and Mrs. D.L. McDaniels. With an estate that now measured 250 feet by 150 feet, Moore was able to demolish the McDaniels house and move the Gray house south where it was subsequently refurbished and enlarged. The house, along with 60 ft of Forest Avenue frontage, was deeded to Mary and her husband Edward Rowland Hills in 1910 (see also Edward R. Hills House).

=== Fire and second Wright design ===
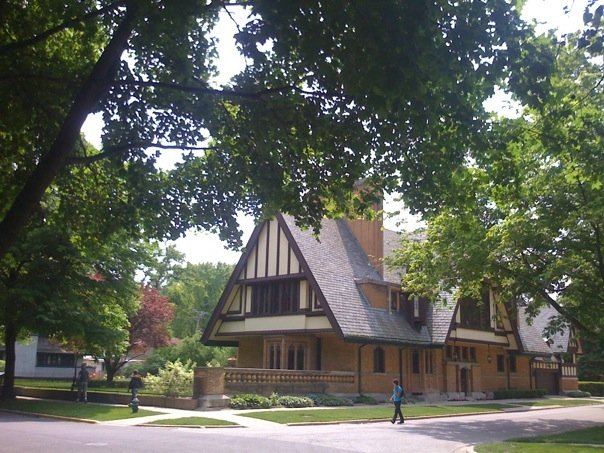
Nathan G. Moore House viewed from the corner of Superior Street and Forest Avenue.

In the early morning of December 23, 1922, an electrical fire destroyed the third floor and caused significant damage to the lower floors of the Nathan G. Moore House. At the time, Wright was engaged in the construction of several projects in California, but he accepted Moore's request to design the reconstruction and appointed Charles E. White, Jr. as local coordinator. Within a year the house was again ready to be occupied.

While Wright took this opportunity to completely redesign the house, he retained the essence of the Tudor style. The foundations as well as most of the first floor walls and south porch were retained. A slate roof and masonry chimneys were rebuilt in almost identical form to the originals, but Wright chose to leave out the second floor walls. The new roof sat directly on the first floor, thus making the entire structure significantly shorter. The pitched roof of the previous porch was traded for a second floor terrace with two open lightwells to the porch below.

This second house was more imbued with integral ornament than the first. A simple, first floor bay window in the east elevation was exchanged for one with a Gothic motif. Each side featured paired lancet windows and a facing of intricately adorned terracotta. While half-timbering was limited to the peaks of three gables, the remaining surfaces were replaced by banding of terracotta and heavily carved, geometrically patterned wood. In these details, Wright not only drew inspiration from English Tudor, but also from Mayan architecture and the elaborate, organic style of Louis Sullivan. The result showed similarities to other Wright designs of the period, including Midway Gardens (1913), the Imperial Hotel (1915–23), the Hollyhock House (1917–1921), and the four textile block houses (1923). The stables and garden house, which both survived the fire and retained original detailing, serve as a comparison between the styles of the earlier and later designs.

=== 1946 to present ===
On August 16, 1946, Nathan Moore died; his house and property were left to Mary Hills. The Hills did not keep the estate, but instead sold it the following June to Milton J. and Mary Summerville. During the transaction, the Hills retained the southern 40 feet of land to expand their own narrow lot. The home's most recent owner was Robert Dugal, who opened the house for seasonal public tours. However, these tours ceased operation in 2001 due to the progression of his Friedreich's ataxia disease. Mr Dugal died in 2020.

== In popular culture ==
The Nathan G. Moore House was featured in season four of the Chicago-based American TV series The Bear, in episode five, "Replicants."

== See also ==
- List of Frank Lloyd Wright works

== Notes ==
†	Given nonconsecutive page numbering, any given page numbers refer to the page within the PDF instead of the number displayed on that page.
