= Medical Arts Building (Oak Park, Illinois) =

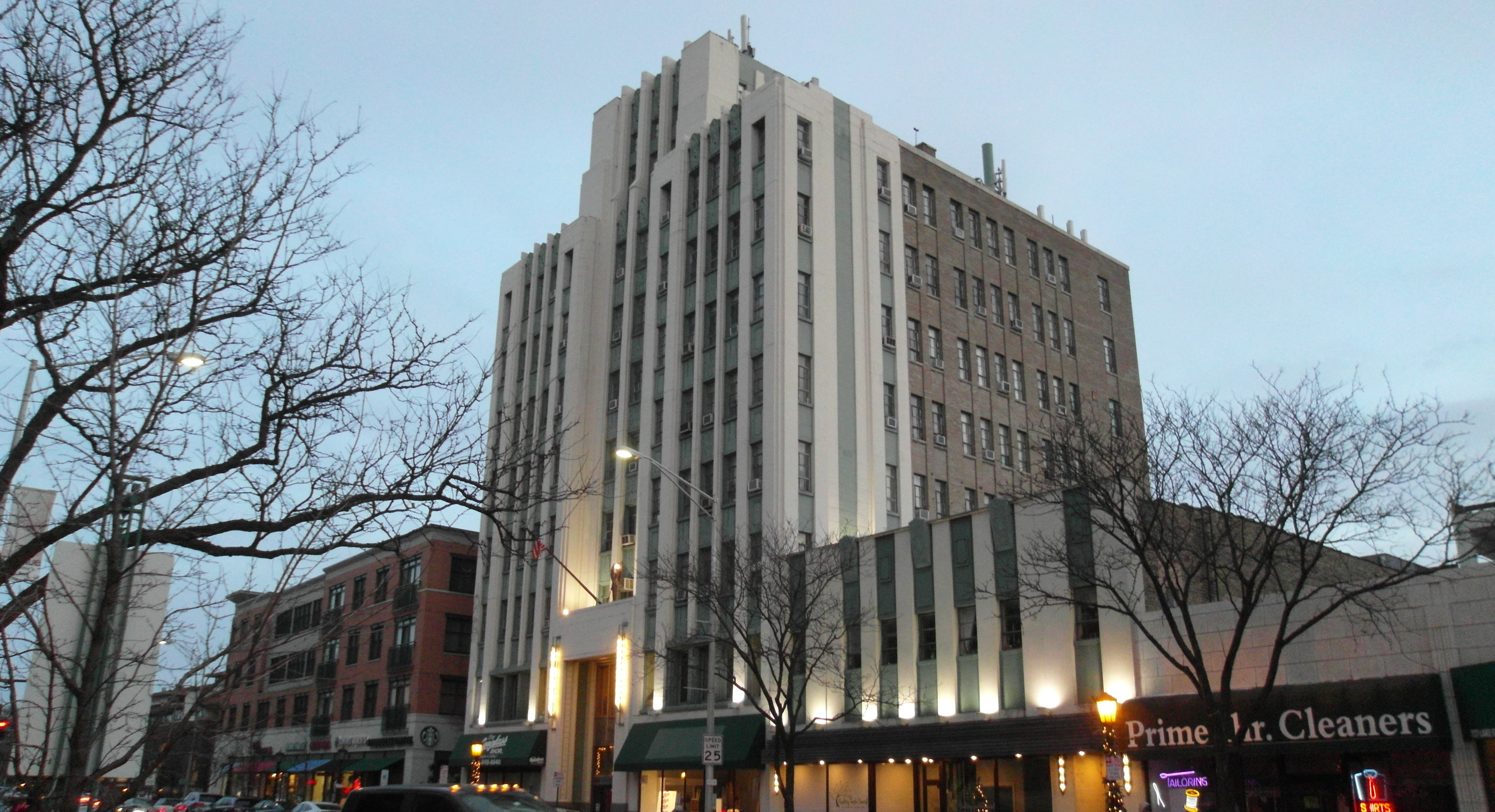

General information
- Architectural style: Art Deco
- Location: 715 Lake Street, Oak Park, Illinois
- Coordinates: 41°53′18.3″N 87°47′36.7″W
- Completed: 1929
- Height: 122 feet (37 m)

Technical details
- Floor count: 10
- Floor area: 42,815 sq ft (4,000 m^{2})

Design and construction
- Architect(s): Roy J. Hotchkiss

The Medical Arts Building is an Art Deco office building at 715 Lake Street, Oak Park, Illinois. It is a contributing property to the Ridgeland–Oak Park Historic District. At 122 feet, it was the tallest building in Oak Park for several decades after it was built.

== History ==
The Medical Arts Building was designed by Oak Park architect Roy J. Hotchkiss and was built by Harper & Stelzer at an approximate cost of $250,000. Hotchkiss had previously worked as head draftsman for Eben Ezra Roberts. The Medical Arts Building was Hotchkiss's principal contribution to Oak Park's architectural landscape. Ground was broken on December 5, 1928, and the first tenants moved on November 15, 1929. By January 1930, the building was almost fully occupied. It was originally owned by Charles B. Scoville and was later owned by the Scoville Trust. Original plans called for four story east and west wings, but these were never built.

During World War II, the Oak Park unit of the Association of Army and Navy Wives was located in the Medical Arts Building. In 1976, the building was sold to Dowling and Company. It was later acquired by Jack and Tim Sheehan. The building's terra cotta facade was restored in 2007. Peterson's Pharmacy was a tenant from 1929, when the building opened, until 2014.
