= George W. Smith House (Oak Park, Illinois) =

Historic house in Oak Park, Illinois

- U.S. Historic district – Contributing property
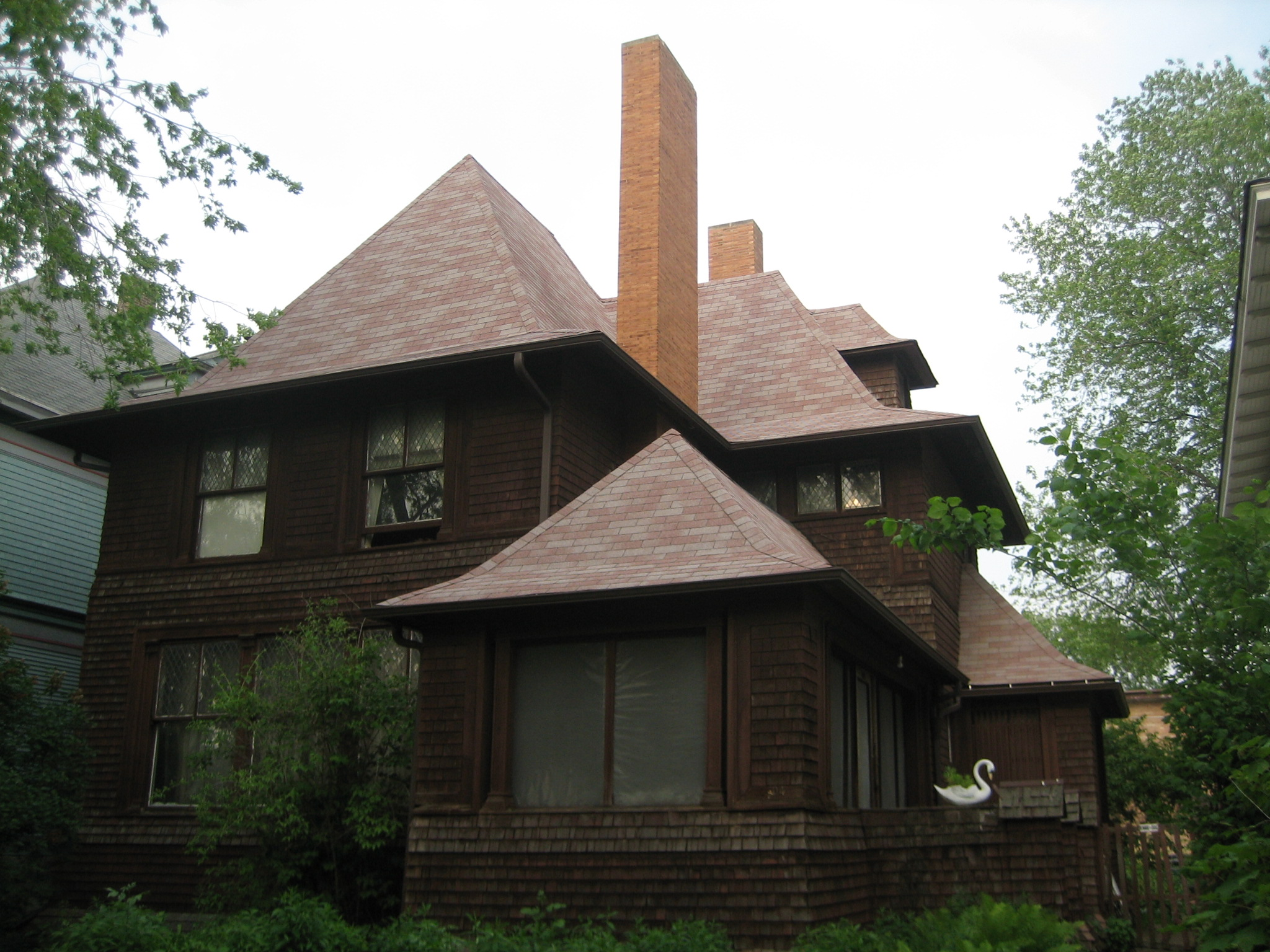
- Interactive map of George W. Smith House
- Location: 404 Home Ave.,Oak Park, Illinois, United States
- Coordinates: 41°52′52″N 87°47′58″W
- Built: 1895 (designed) 1898 (built)
- Architect: Frank Lloyd Wright
- Architectural style: Shingle style
- Part of: Ridgeland-Oak Park Historic District (ID83003564)
- Added to NRHP: December 8, 1983

The George W. Smith House is a residence at 404 Home Avenue in Oak Park, a suburb of Chicago, Illinois, United States, designed by American architect Frank Lloyd Wright in 1895. It was constructed in 1898 and occupied by a Marshall Field & Company salesman. The design elements were employed a decade later when Wright designed the Unity Temple in Oak Park. The house is listed as a contributing property to the Ridgeland-Oak Park Historic District which joined the National Register of Historic Places in December 1983.

== History ==
The George W. Smith House was designed in 1895 by architect Frank Lloyd Wright as one of a series of low-cost homes for engineer and inventor Charles E. Roberts. However, like several others for Roberts, the Smith house was not built at the time of its design. The home's eventual owner and namesake, George W. Smith, was a salesman for the Chicago firm Marshall Field & Company.

== Architecture ==
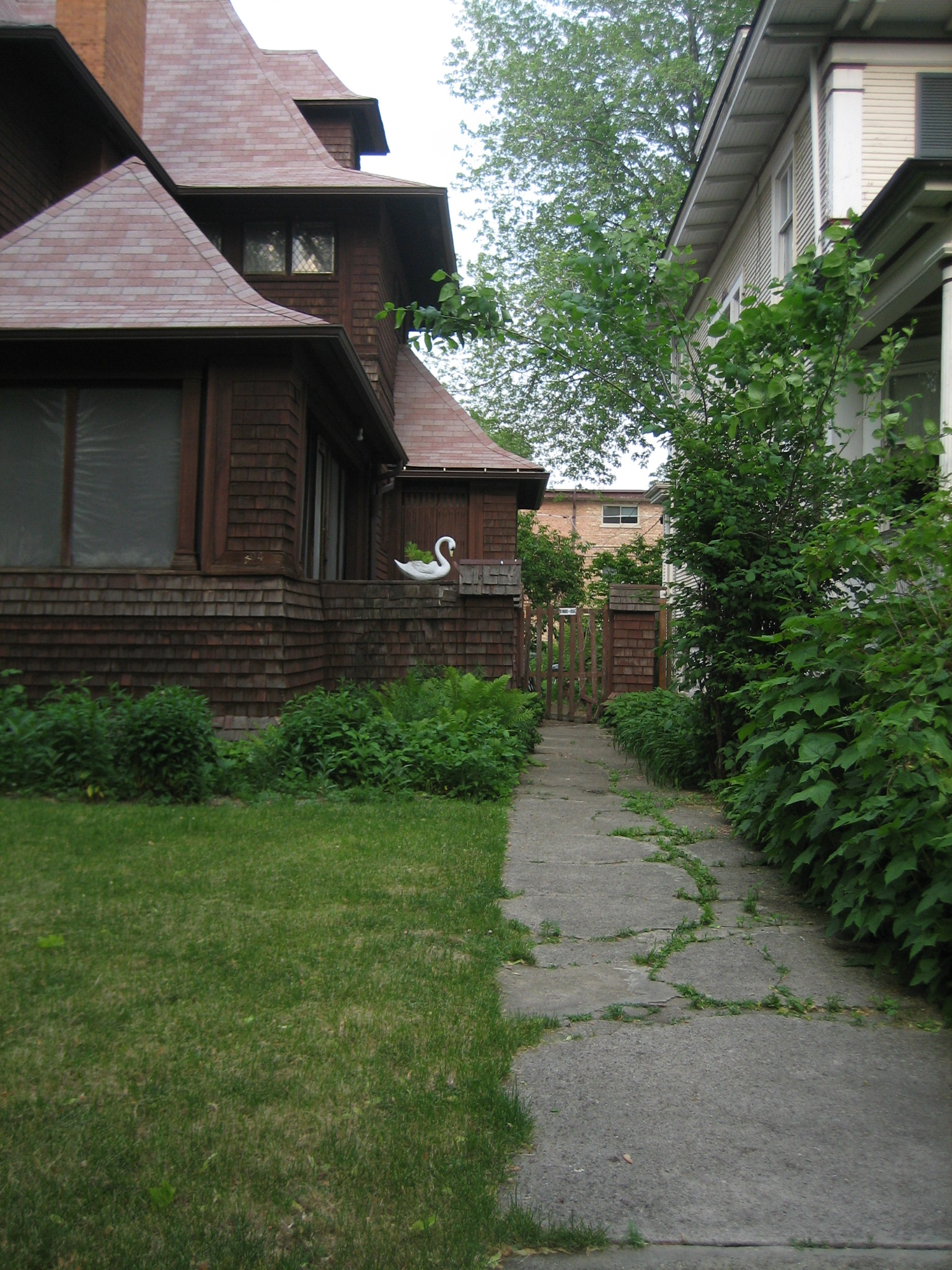
The home's horizontal and shingled trim clearly continues around corners.

The home is cast in Shingle style, a variation on Queen Anne, and predates the full maturation of Wright's early Prairie style architecture. The Smith House's most striking feature is the angled break in the roofline. The home's detailing would probably be more appropriate on a stucco clad house than shingle clad home such as the George Smith House. However, no early photographs exist to determine if the home's exterior was ever altered. The "wall and pier trim" defines a folded plane by continuing around corners. Wright employed this same effect ten years later when he designed the Unity Temple, of which George W. Smith was a member.

The Smith House is similar to the Harry Goodrich House through its high pitched and double sloped roof. The Goodrich House, an 1896 Wright design, may have also been one of the unbuilt homes Wright designed for Roberts. The shingles stand in contrast to the style Frank Lloyd Wright was using by the time the house was built in 1898. By that period he began to employ horizontal boards with batten siding, which emphasized the linear, horizontal effects of his later work. The design for the G.W. Smith House, very stylistic, is clearly an example of Wright's early period.

The home features elements from Shingle style and demonstrates early experimentation by Wright which ultimately led to his unique Prairie style. The shingled cladding is a give away of Shingle style and it is meant, in general, to unify the irregular outline of the house. The house also lacks corner boards, allowing the shingled cladding to wrap continuously around the building as well as hip roof dormers, both elements are typical to Shingle style. Wright's early experimentation with elements that became hallmark to Prairie style can also be seen in the Smith House. The broad, flat chimney that dominates the front elevation as well as minimal horizontal banding are both evident elements found in the home and within the Prairie School of architecture.

== Significance ==
The house is an early example of Frank Lloyd Wright's work. It is included as a contributing property within the Ridgeland-Oak Park Historic District which was listed on the U.S. National Register of Historic Places on December 8, 1983. The house is one of two Frank Lloyd Wright designed buildings within the Ridgeland Historic District; the other structure is the Unity Temple. The Smith House is the only example of residential architecture by Wright found within the boundaries of the Ridgeland Historic District. The historic district, overall, lacks examples of Wright's full-fledged Prairie style that are found in abundance in the nearby Frank Lloyd Wright-Prairie School of Architecture Historic District.

== See also ==
- List of Frank Lloyd Wright works
