= William H. Copeland House =

Historic house in Oak Park, Illinois

- U.S. Historic district – Contributing property
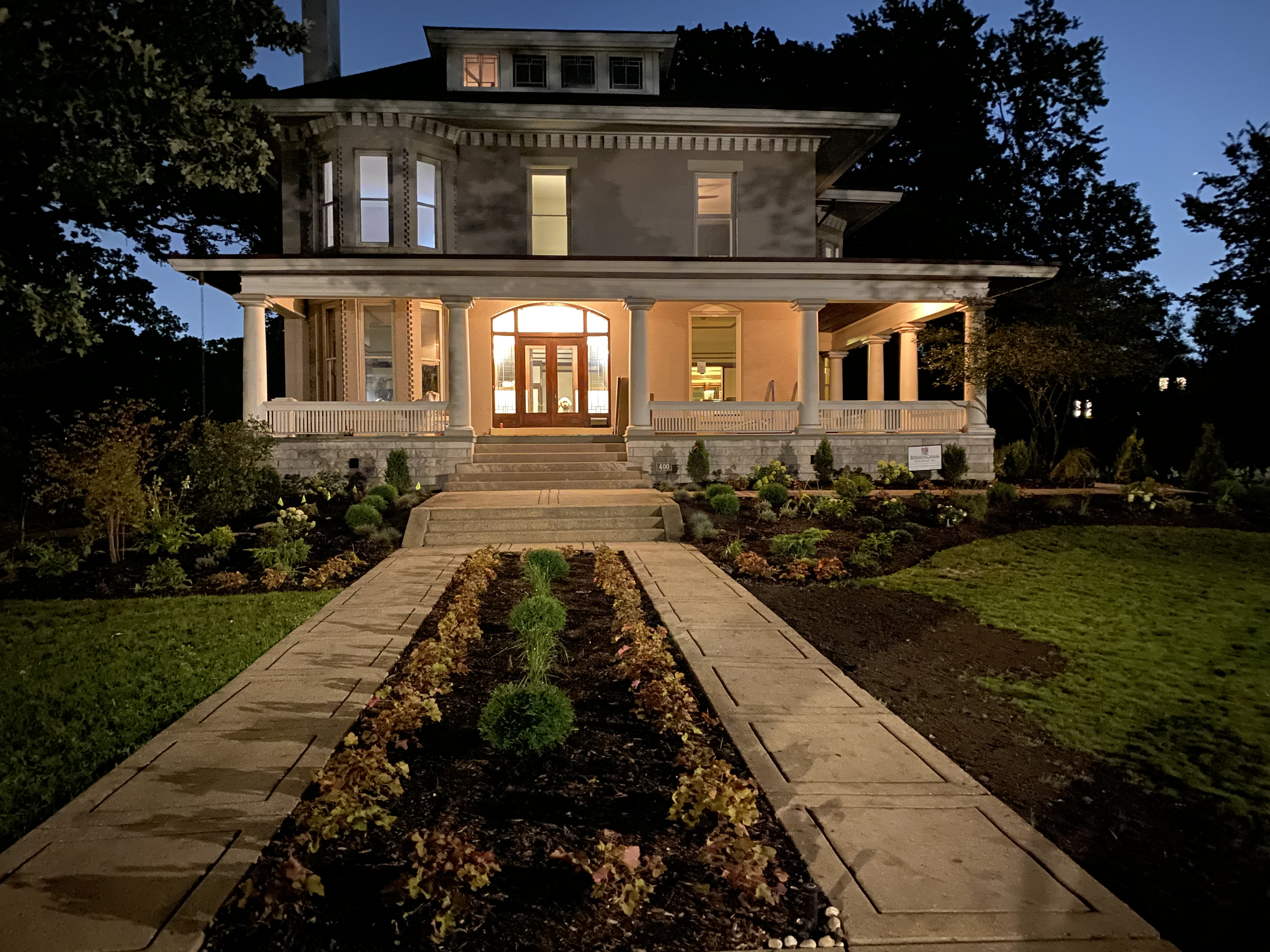

- Location within Illinois Location within the United States
- Interactive map showing the Copeland House’s location
- Location: 400 Forest Ave Oak Park, IL 60302
- Coordinates: 41°53′35.21″N 87°47′59.36″W
- Built: 1909
- Architect: Frank Lloyd Wright (remodel)
- Architectural style: Prairie style
- Part of: Frank Lloyd Wright-Prairie School of Architecture Historic District (ID73000699)
- Added to NRHP: December 4, 1973

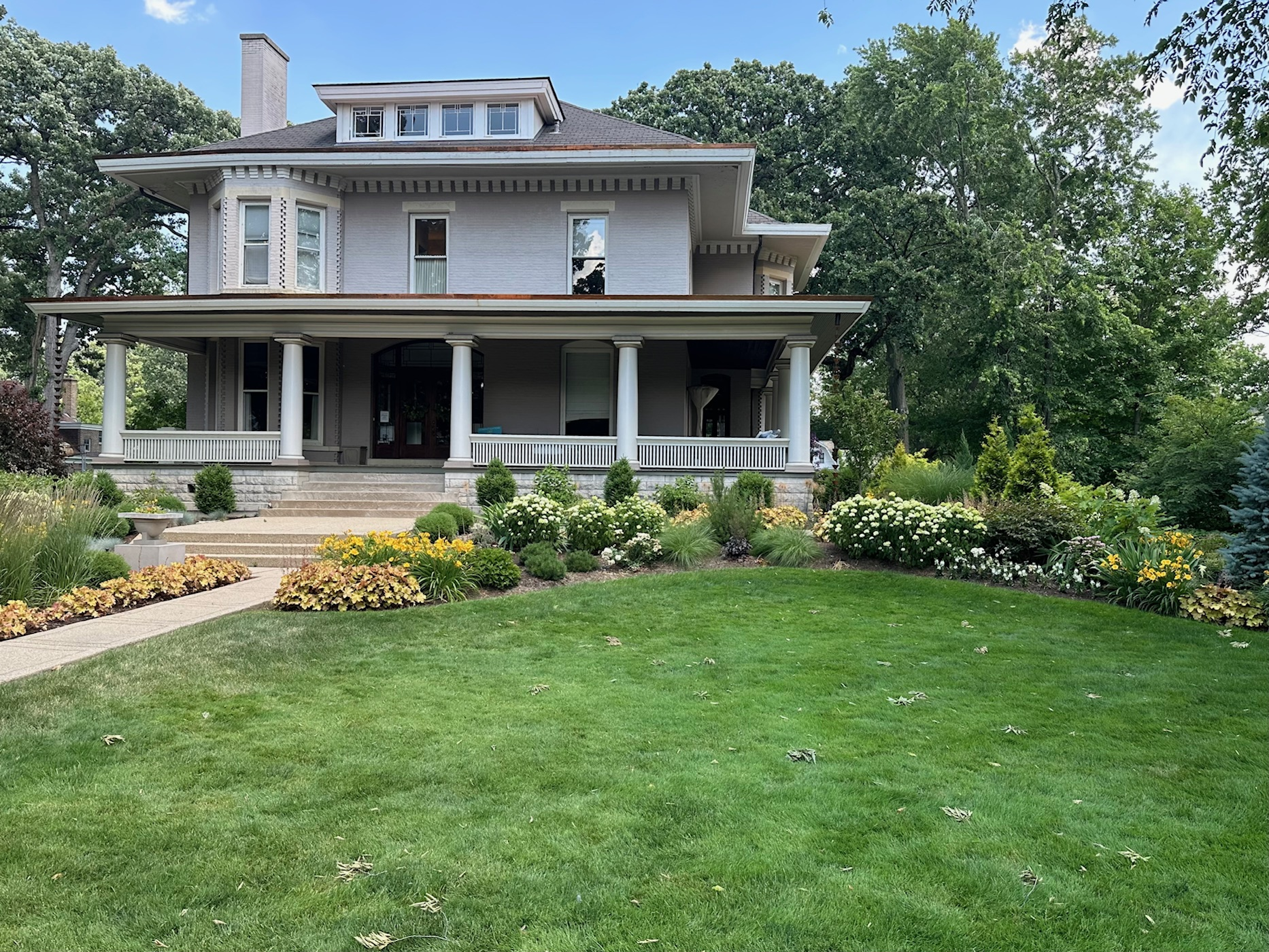
Exterior photo of The William H. Copeland House showing Wright's work on the roof line, attic dormers, and wraparound porch.

The William H. Copeland House is a home in Oak Park, a suburb of Chicago, Illinois, United States. In 1909 the home underwent a remodeling designed by famous American architect Frank Lloyd Wright. The original Italianate home was built in the 1870s. Dr. William H. Copeland commissioned Wright for the remodel and Wright's original vision of the project proposed a three-story Prairie house. That version was rejected and the result was the more subdued, less severely Prairie, William H. Copeland House. On the exterior the most significant alteration by Wright was the addition of a low-pitched hip roof. The house has been listed as a contributing property to a U.S. Registered Historic District since 1973.

== History ==
The William Copeland House was first constructed around 1873 for William H. Harman. The large, Italianate home represented a microcosm of the general character of homes in Oak Park before Wright began designing buildings. Homes of this style, "classically tinged" and "robust," dotted the landscape of small towns across the United States. In 1909 the then-owner, Dr. William Copeland, a prominent surgeon with offices in Chicago and Cleveland, commissioned Frank Lloyd Wright to remodel the home. It was the second commission for Wright from Copeland; in 1908 the architect had designed a garage for Copeland at the residence.

== Architecture ==
The Copeland House was designed around 1873 by an unknown architect and cast in the Italianate style. Wright's 1909 remodel work included exterior and interior alterations. A new tile roof was added above the decorative brick work; the roof was removed in the 1950s because of its maintenance expenses. The work fused Wright's Prairie style with the traditional Italiante style through the building's exterior lines. The new low-pitched hip roof that Wright designed, along with the wrap-around porch and overhanging eaves are all elements found in the Copeland House which can be found on other Prairie style homes Wright designed. The remodeling work also replaced the original doors with doors, frame, sidelights and a transom window all of Wright's own design.

Wright's original plan called for the Copeland House to be remodeled into a three-story Prairie house but that plan was rejected. The result was that the Wright-designed remodel was not as ambitious as it had been planned to be originally. Of the exterior work Wright designed, the new roof was the most substantial. In addition to the expansive exterior work Wright remodeled the main rooms on the ground floor to adhere to his Prairie style. Also inside he designed the dining room sideboard, table and chairs.

== Significance ==
The Copeland House is an example of Wright's remodeling design work. It is listed as a contributing property to the Frank Lloyd Wright-Prairie School of Architecture Historic District. The historic district joined the U.S. National Register of Historic Places in 1973. The William Copeland House is one of three homes in Oak Park that Wright was commissioned to remodel. The other two are the 1906 Peter A. Beachy House and the Hills-DeCaro House, also on Forest Avenue. Wright also added a large brick fireplace to the library. However, as evidenced by the sagging cantilevers at Fallingwater and the sagging second floor of the Heurtley House, Wright's use of available materials occasionally exceeded their structural capacity: the mantle of the fireplace is a large stone that cracked under the weight of the bricks, as did steps in the front stairway. The center wall of the coach house also sank due to inadequacy of the center foundation.

== See also ==
- List of Frank Lloyd Wright works
