= Walter Gerts House =

House in River Forest, Illinois, US

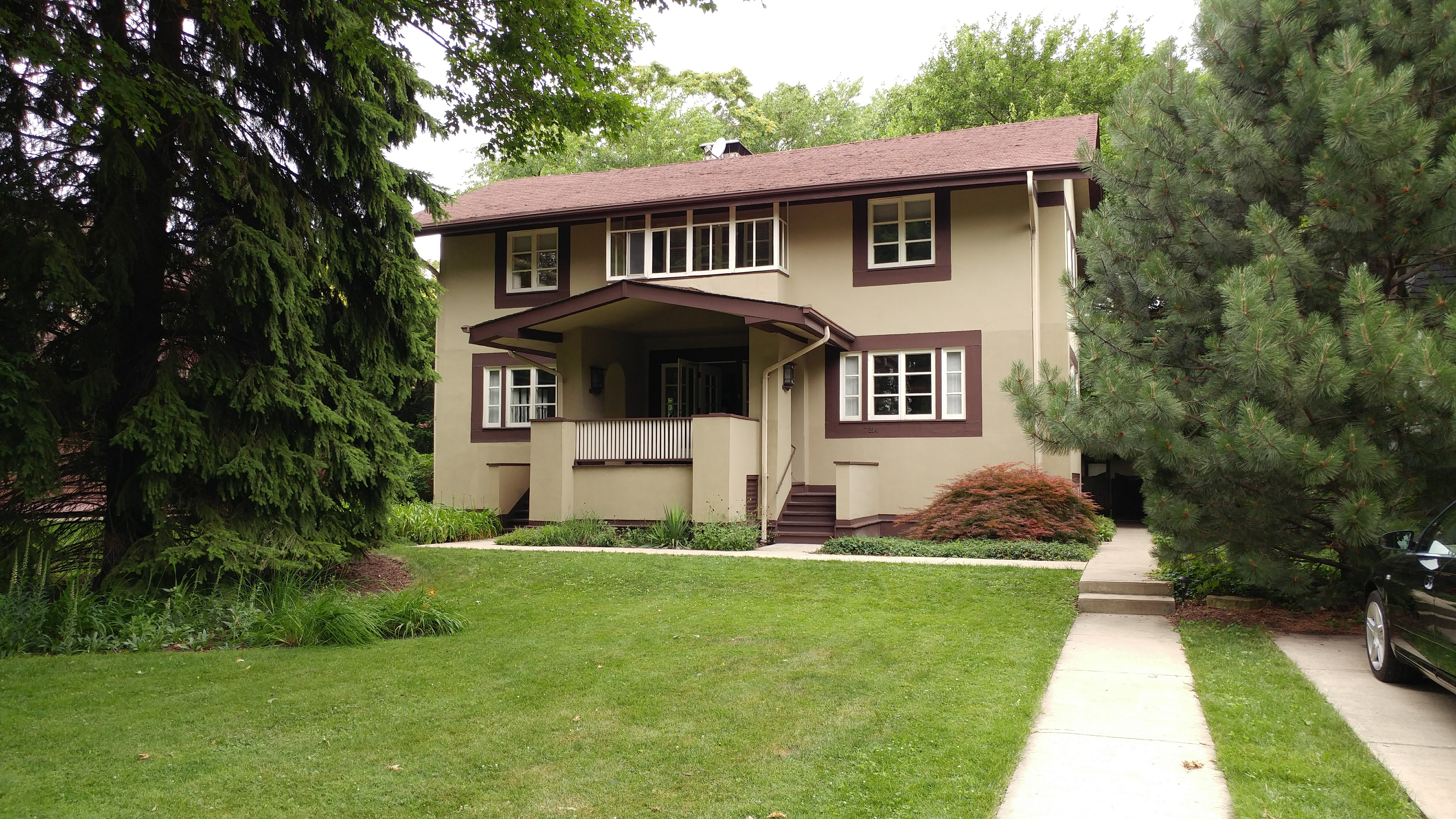
Walter Gerts House

The Walter Gerts House in River Forest, Illinois, United States, was originally designed in 1905 by Charles E. White, who studied with Frank Lloyd Wright at his Oak Park studio. White went on to pursue a successful career as both an architect and writer about related matters, and designed several important buildings in Oak Park including the massive Art Deco post office in 1933. The house shows influences both from White's East Coast beginnings in its colonial symmetry and his training with Wright in the Prairie School of architecture.

On December 2, 1910, there was a fire that destroyed much of the Walter Gerts House, but thanks to a neighbor who threw a flatiron through a window and awakened the Gerts family, no one was injured. Gerts then hired Frank Lloyd Wright, who had just returned from Europe, to remodel the house. Wright had built houses for Both Walter and his father, George Gerts, in Michigan in 1902. Wright wrote to Darwin Martin "A house burned down here day before yesterday and the [owner] has employed me to rebuild it."

In remodeling the house Wright totally re-configured the orientation of the central stairway and made major changes to the upstairs floor plan. Square spindles are featured throughout the house, both to separate first floor rooms and as part of built in radiator covers both upstairs and down. The back door was moved from behind the kitchen to the center of the house. The central staircase features built in drawers on both sides of the landing and stained glass windows that match those surrounding the front door. There are many other built in storage units throughout the house. Two upstairs bedrooms were combined to create one large master bedroom with a fireplace. The second floor balcony which was originally in a hallway became part of a new bedroom.

The Gerts family moved to 819 Thatcher Avenue in River Forest around 1918.

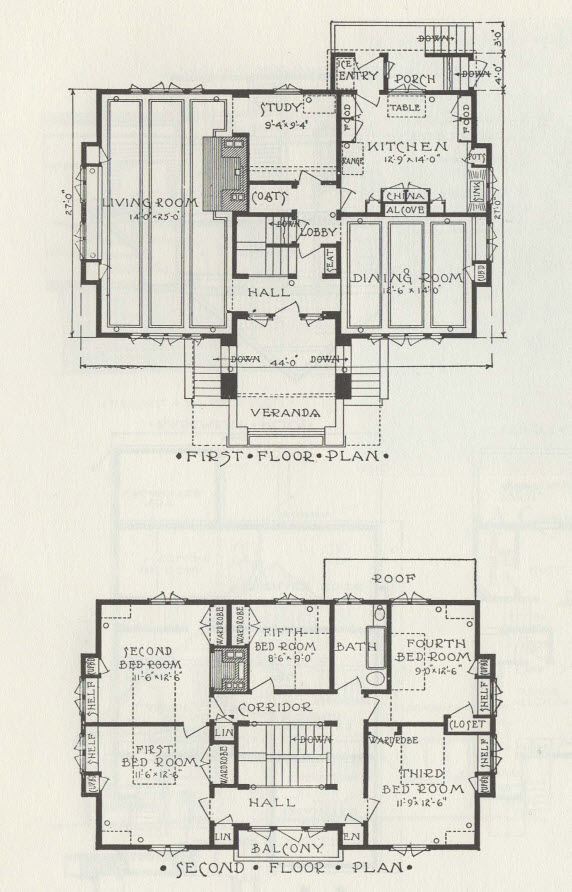
Walter Gerts House original plan by Charles E. White

== See also ==
- List of Frank Lloyd Wright works
