= Charles E. Roberts =

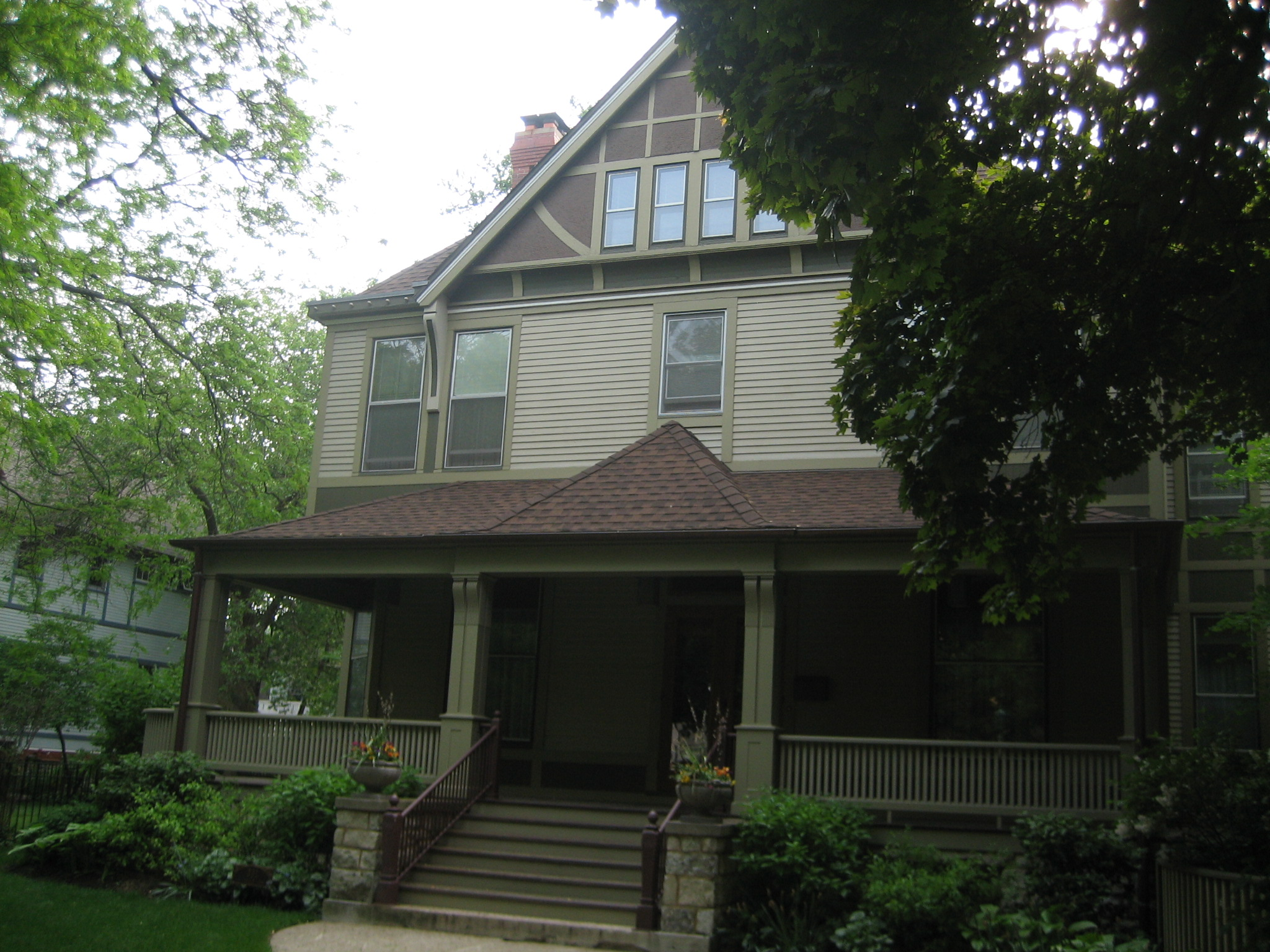
Charles E. Roberts house in Oak Park, Illinois. The interior redesign was done by Frank Lloyd Wright in 1896.

Charles E. Roberts (March 13, 1843 – March 1934) was an American engineer, inventor and an important early client and patron of Frank Lloyd Wright. In 1896, Wright remodeled Robert's house in Oak Park.

== Personal life ==
Charles E Roberts was born on March 13, 1843, near Rochester, New York, the son of David Roberts and his wife Elizabeth Whipple Roberts.

On February 3, 1876, Roberts married Cleantha Wilbur. They had five children: Alice May, Owen Wilbur, James Wilbur, Charles Willis and Chapin Roberts, all of whom were born in Illinois. Alice May Roberts (born December 13, 1876), married Prairie School architect Charles E. White, Jr. (b May 18, 1876, in Boston) who worked in Wright's Oak Park Studio (1903–1905), and who later remodeled the Charles E. Roberts Stable, on November 26, 1901. Mrs. Charles E. Roberts (née Cleantha Wilbur) was the maternal aunt of B. Harley Bradley of Kankakee, Illinois, another important Wright client (her sister, Alice M. Wilbur, married Byron Chapman Bradley).

Roberts died in Oak Park in March 1934.

== Influence on architecture ==
Roberts was an influential member of the building committee of Unity Temple in Oak Park, Illinois. For Roberts, Wright also developed a series of block plans from 1896 to 1903, notably several variations of the Quadruple Block Plan. For Roberts, Wright also designed the Charles E. Roberts Summer Home and five houses for Charles E. Roberts, Ridgeland, IL. Wright remodeled the Charles E. Roberts House and designed the Charles E. Roberts Stable in Oak Park.

Many architectural historians have mistakenly identified Charles E. Roberts as the father of Oak Park Studio architect Isabel Roberts, As has been well documented, Isabel's father was James H. Roberts, of South Bend, Indiana, the son of William and Sarah Roberts of Utica, New York. Charles E. Roberts and James H. Roberts were not siblings, in fact, even though both men were mechanically inclined, successful inventors, no family or business connection has been found between them.

== Career ==
Charles E. Roberts served as the President and Director of the Chicago Screw Company, President and Director of the Standard Screw Company and Vice President and Director of the Pearson Machine Company. Roberts invented a machine that could make the tops and bottoms of screws at the same time; he sold the business for a million dollars and devoted the remainder of his life to other inventions.

Among those, Roberts was also the inventor of a machine for threading bung-bushes, for Crane Brothers Manufacturing Company, of Chicago. Roberts held automobile patent #748015 for an electric car which was made and marketed by the Standard Screw Company, issued on Dec. 20, 1903. Roberts also invented a “Machine for Cutting Butter or the like Material”, the patent of which was owned by Charles E. Roberts and his son, Owen W. Roberts, Chicago. The patent was filed on Feb. 26, 1907.

Roberts served on the board of trustees of Lombard College in Galesburg, IL.
