= Peter A. Beachy House =

Historic house in Oak Park, Illinois

- U.S. Historic district – Contributing property

- Location within Illinois Location within the United States
- Interactive map showing Beachy House’s location
- Location: 238 Forest Ave.,Oak Park, Cook County, Illinois
- Coordinates: 41°53′29″N 87°47′59″W
- Built: 1906
- Architect: Frank Lloyd Wright
- Architectural style: Prairie style
- Part of: Frank Lloyd Wright-Prairie School of Architecture Historic District (ID73000699)
- Added to NRHP: December 4, 1973

The Peter A. Beachy House is a home at 238 Forest Avenue in Oak Park, a suburb of Chicago, Illinois, United States. It was entirely remodeled by architect Frank Lloyd Wright in 1906. The house that stands today is almost entirely different from the site's original home, a Gothic cottage. The home is listed as a contributing property to the Frank Lloyd Wright-Prairie School of Architecture Historic District, which was listed on the U.S. National Register of Historic Places.

== History ==
The original home, a Gothic cottage, was almost entirely replaced when banker Peter A. Beachy commissioned Frank Lloyd Wright to "remodel" the home. The house is set at right angles to the street to utilize part of the cottage's original foundation and take full advantage of a southern exposure. Wright built this house after returning from a trip to Japan, and the exterior has several Japan-inspired elements.

== Architecture ==
Though the Beachy House incorporates an earlier structure, the original building is obliterated on the interior. The only points that the original house, known as the Fargo House, still exist are found in the basement of the Beachy House. The house has seven gables and sits on the largest residential lot in Oak Park. Much of the furniture in the house was also Wright designed but the windows contained only wooden muntins, no leaded or colored glass. Wright designed leaded-glass light fixtures that are also used throughout the house.

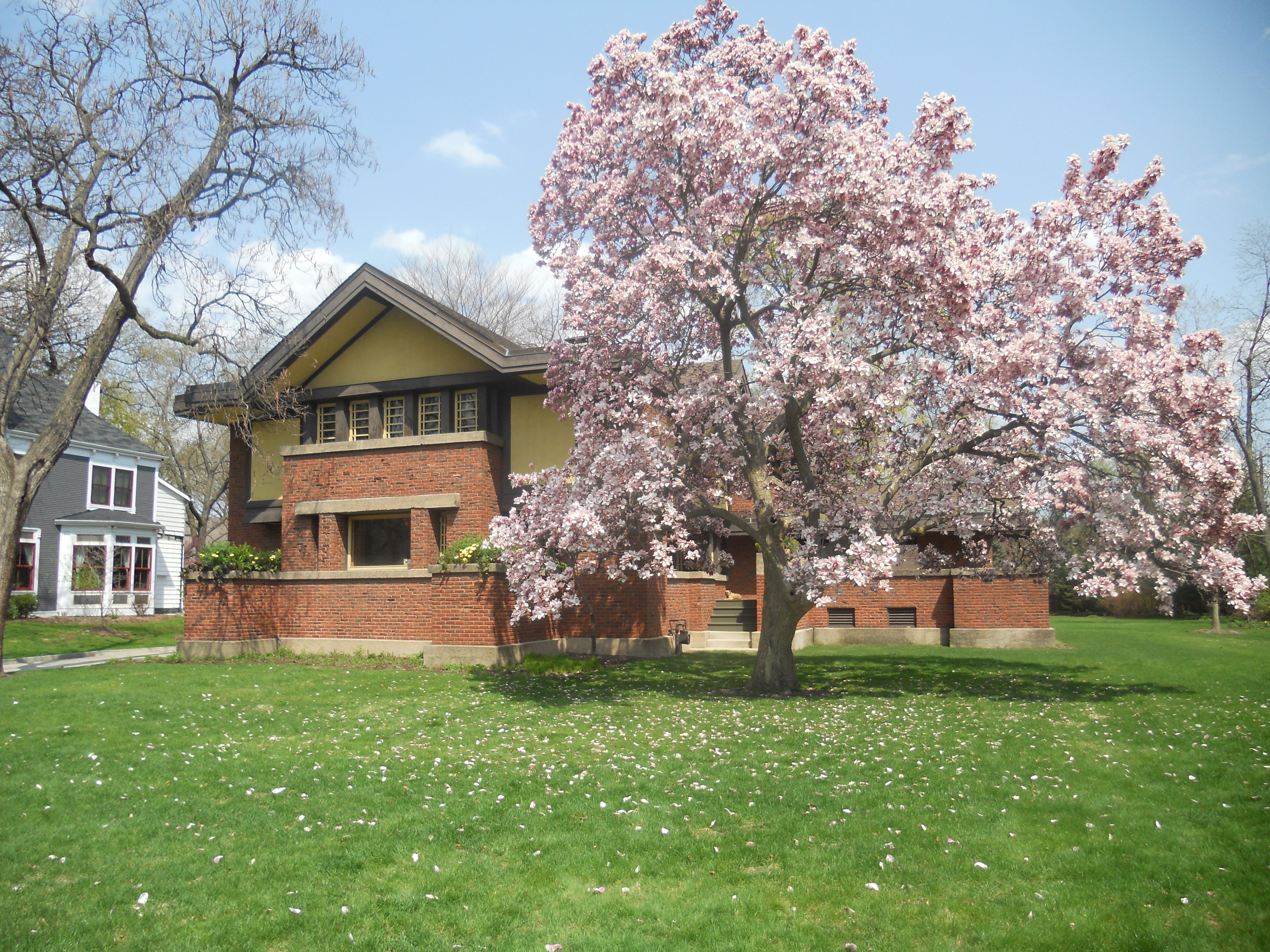
Peter A. Beachy House (1906), 238 Forest Avenue, by Frank Lloyd Wright, Oak Park, IL

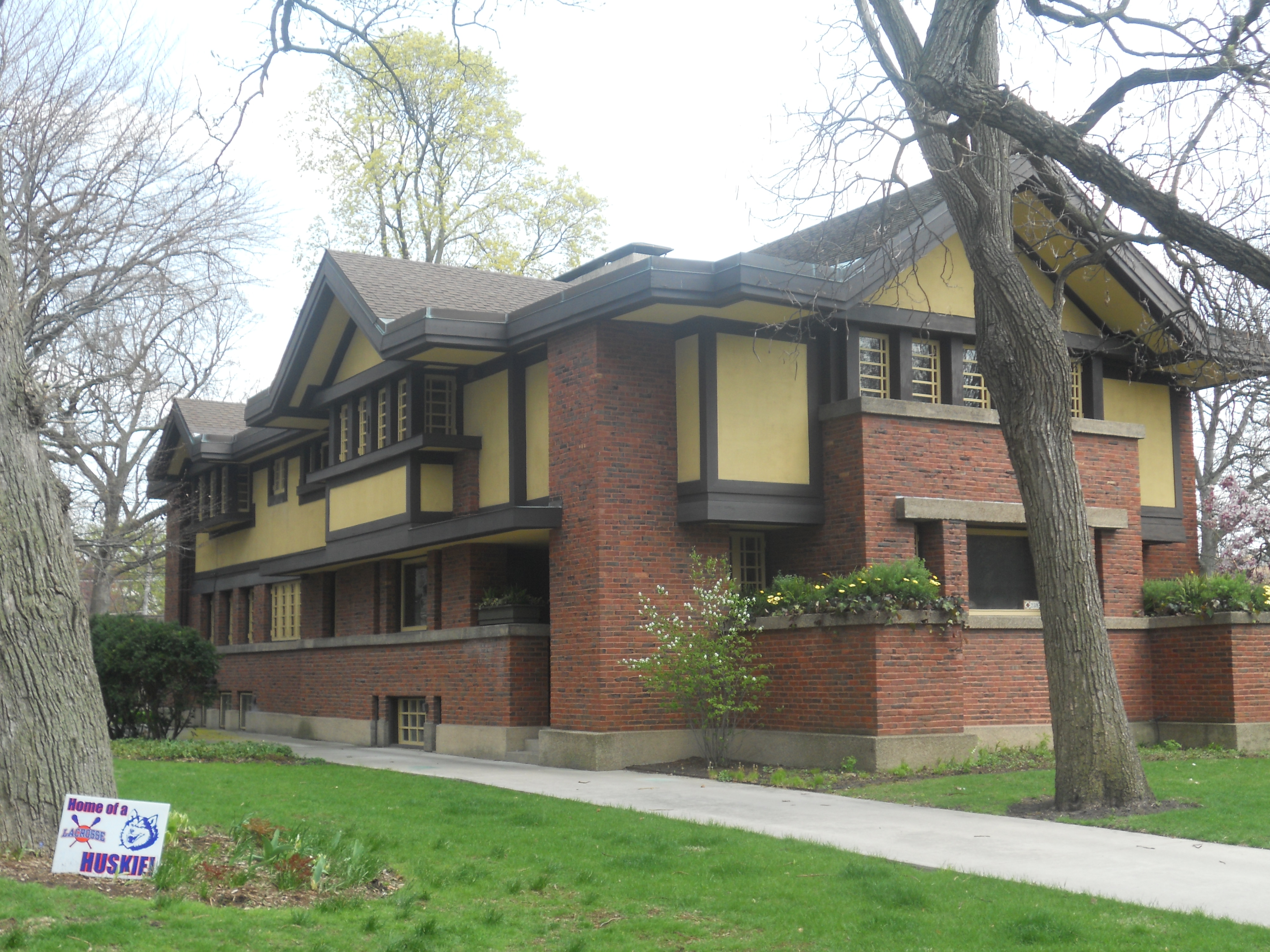
Peter A. Beachy House (1906), Frank Lloyd Wright, Oak Park, IL

== Significance ==
The Peter A. Beachy House is an example of Wright's prairie design work. It is listed as a contributing property to the Frank Lloyd Wright-Prairie School of Architecture Historic District. The historic district joined the U.S. National Register of Historic Places in 1973. The Peter A. Beachy House is one of three homes in Oak Park that Wright was commissioned to "remodel." The other two are the 1906 Hills-DeCaro House, which was under renovation when the Beachy House was built, and the William H. Copeland House, also on Forest Avenue.

== See also ==
- List of Frank Lloyd Wright works
