= Charles E. White Jr. =

American architect

Charles E. White Jr. (1876–1936) was a noted Chicago area architect who for a time worked in the Oak Park studio of Frank Lloyd Wright and who, both before and after that time, had a successful and influential career as an architect and a writer on architectural subjects. It is fair to say that White is an under-appreciated member of Wright's Oak Park studio staff.

== Early years and education ==
Charles Elmer White Jr. was born May 18, 1876, in Lynn, Massachusetts, the son of Charles E. White Sr. and his wife Agnes Elizabeth Safford. Through his father, White was a direct descendant of American Revolutionary War soldiers William Loud and Michael Porter.

While the "Book of Chicagoans" (1917) states that White took special classes at the Massachusetts Institute of Technology and Paul Sprague writes in "Guide to Frank Lloyd Wright and Prairie School Architecture in Oak Park" that White graduated from the architecture program at the Massachusetts Institute of Technology in 1895, M.I.T.'s registrar's office has no record of him ever attending, either a regular or special student, much less graduating from the institution.

== Architectural practice ==
For approximately eight years, White worked in the East, chiefly practicing architecture with Walter R. B. Wilcox in Burlington, Vermont. At the age of twenty-seven, White then moved to Chicago in 1903 to work for Frank Lloyd Wright, at the time when other employees in the studio included Walter Burley Griffin, Marion Mahony, Isabel Roberts, and artist Richard Bock. The letters which White wrote to his friend Wilcox offer valuable insights into the building methods, working relationships and responsibilities of the Oak Park studio in what has been called Wright's "first golden age" when the Prairie Style was developed. When writing about this time in his life, some architectural historians have mistakenly called White a "student" or "apprentice" of Frank Lloyd Wright; both terms are incorrect. White was an architect in his own right, having practiced architecture for nearly a decade in the East before the three years when he worked in the Oak Park studio.

By 1905 White launched his own practice in Oak Park. He designed and built his own studio and collaborated with Wright and Vernon S. Watson on the River Forest Tennis Club of 1906. His office was busy with many commissions in the years leading up to World War I.

In addition to the practice of architecture, White wrote a number of influential articles about home building, ranging from matters of taste and design to construction methods. These were widely circulated in popular home magazines of the day. White was also a champion of fireproof hollow tile construction and helped to popularize it nationally. A gifted renderer, his architectural illustrations often accompanied his writings, which featured the work of many different colleagues, including, Frank Lloyd Wright, Marion Mahony Griffin, Walter Burley Griffin, and William Eugene Drummond, as well as his own designs.

During the Great War he served in the quartermaster corps. In 1922 White formed a partnership with fellow MIT graduate Bertram A. Weber; Weber had worked in the office of noted Chicago architect Howard Van Doren Shaw (MIT class of 1892) prior to their partnership. The firm of White and Weber continued to practice in Chicago until White's death in 1936. They designed the Art Deco United States Post Office (1933) in Oak Park, the Rectory of the Grace Episcopal Church, Oak Park, as well as the Haish Memorial Library in Dekalb, Illinois, an Art Deco Indiana limestone building on the National Register of Historic Places.

== Personal life ==
White married the daughter of prominent Oak Park inventor Charles E. Roberts, Alice May Roberts (born December 13, 1876); they were the parents of Charles Safford White (1903–1984) and Elizabeth Whipple White (1906–2001). A third son, James Roberts (no dates) is also named in The Book of Chicagoans, by Albert Nelson Marquis, 1911.

White died August 15, 1936, in Oak Park.

== Selected work ==
- Curtis B. Camp Residence, Oak Park, IL
- "An Easy Housekeeping Cottage" Chicago, IL, no date given
- Walter Gerts House, River Forest, IL, 1905
- Mrs. C. E. Simmons House, Oak Park, IL, 1905
- Robert Kermen House, Oak Park, IL, 1907
- J. Fletcher Skinner Residence, 608 Linden Avenue, Oak Park IL, 1908
- Elizabeth F. Cheney Mansion, 220 North Euclid, Oak Park, IL, 1913
- Charles E. White Jr. Residence, Oak Park, IL, 1916
- Nathan G. Moore House, 333 Forest Ave, Oak Park, IL, remodeling (after the 1922 fire), with Frank Lloyd Wright
- Haish Memorial Library, DeKalb, IL, White & Weber, architects, 1931
- United States Post Office, Oak Park, IL, White & Weber, architects, 1933 (adjacent to Unity Temple)
- Rudolph Pabst House, Winnetka, IL. White & Weber, architects, 1936
- G.F.Kelly Home, 729 North Kenilworth, Oak Park, IL 1912
- Oak Park & River Forest Day Nursery, 1139 Randolph St., Oak Park, 1923
- Frank S. Badger Residence, Glen Ellyn, IL 1910

== Selected publications ==
Books:

- Successful Houses and How to Build Them; Charles E. White Jr. 1912 – Important images of Frank Lloyd Wright's homes include: Moore Residence (First) p 8 (1895 s.034); Dana-Thomas pp 41, 51 (Interior), 216 (1902 S.072), Hill p 66 (2), 425 (1900 S.051); Heurtley, p 217 (1902 S.074); Beachy p 220 (1906 S.117); Winslow p 225 (1894 S.024); Coonley p 284 (1907 S.135); Roberts interior p350 (1908 S.150); Martin interior p 397 (1904 S.100); Winslow Stable p 498 (1894 S.025). These images document the homes prior to 1912.
- The Bungalow Book, Charles E. White Jr. (1923)

Important articles:

- An Easy Housekeeping Cottage for $1800, by Charles E. White Jr.; Ladies Home Journal, 1911
- What You Should Know When Building A Little House, by Charles E. White Jr.; Ladies Home Journal
- A Fireproof House for Less Than $4000, Designed By Charles E. White Jr., with Illustrations; by George A. Newman; Ladies Home Journal, February 15, 1911
- When Houses are in Good Taste, by Charles E. White Jr., in Keith's Magazine, 1913
- Many Ways To Build A Fireproof House, by Charles E. White Jr.; House Beautiful, 1914
