= James B. Irving House =

Historic house in Illinois, United States

- U.S. National Register of Historic Places
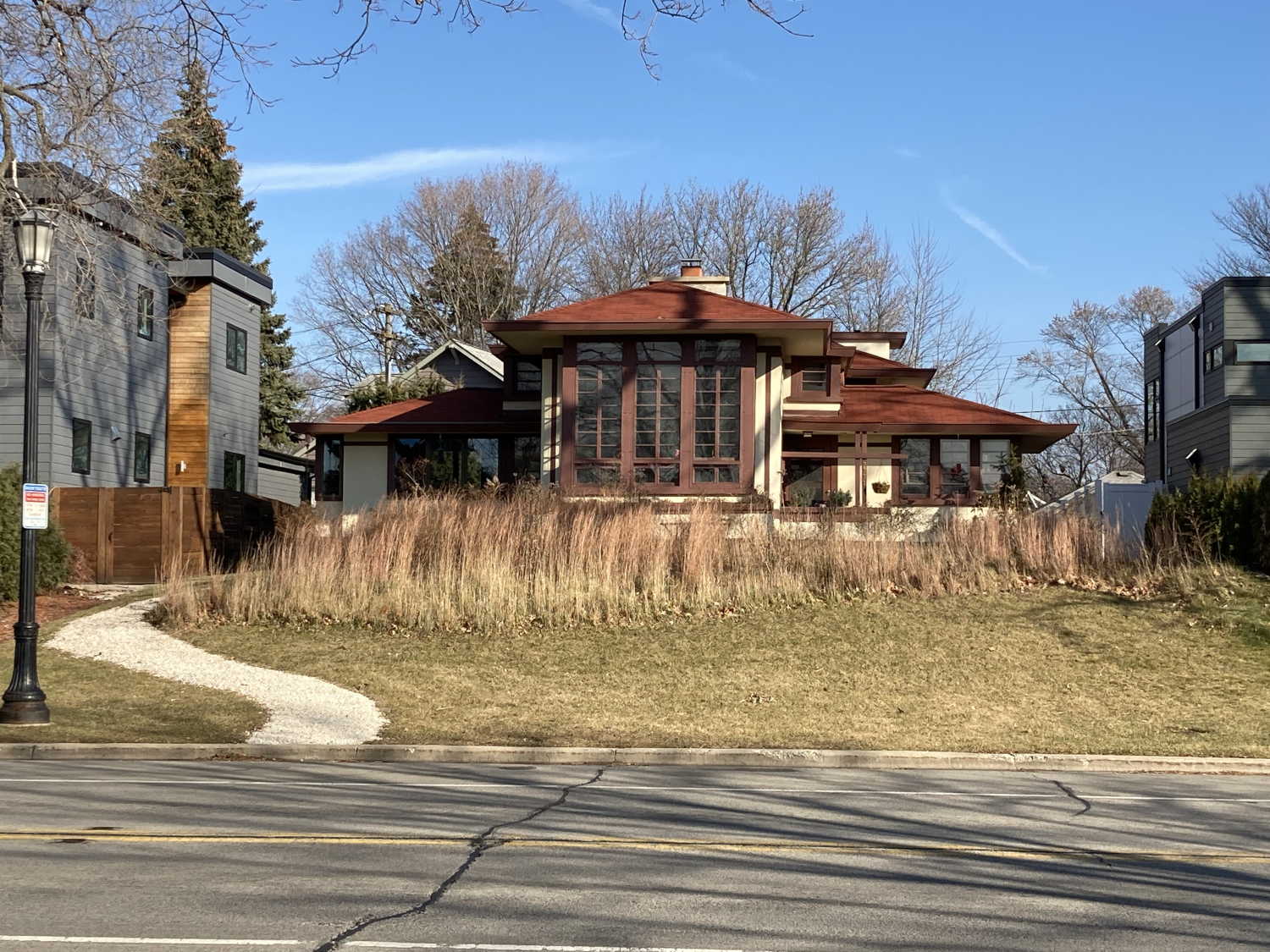

- Location within Chicago metropolitan area Location within Illinois Location within the United States
- Location: 2771 Crawford Ave., Evanston, Illinois
- Coordinates: 42°04′08″N 87°43′50″W
- Built: 1928
- Architect: John S. Van Bergen
- Architectural style: Prairie School
- NRHP reference No.: 100006102
- Added to NRHP: February 5, 2021

The James B. Irving House is a historic house at 2771 Crawford Avenue in Evanston, Illinois. The house was built in 1928 for James Irving and his family; it was originally located at 1318 Isabella Street in neighboring Wilmette. John S. Van Bergen, a prominent Chicago-area architect and former employee of Frank Lloyd Wright, designed the Prairie School house. The house has a stucco exterior with bands of ornamental wood, rows of casement windows, and a low hip roof with wide overhanging eaves, all characteristic features of the Prairie School. The interior has a split-level plan, allowing for separate floors while keeping the house low to the ground. To avoid its demolition, the house was moved from its Wilmette site to its current location in 2014–15.

The house was added to the National Register of Historic Places on February 5, 2021.
