= Andrew O. Anderson House =

Prairie style house in DeKalb, Illinois, United States

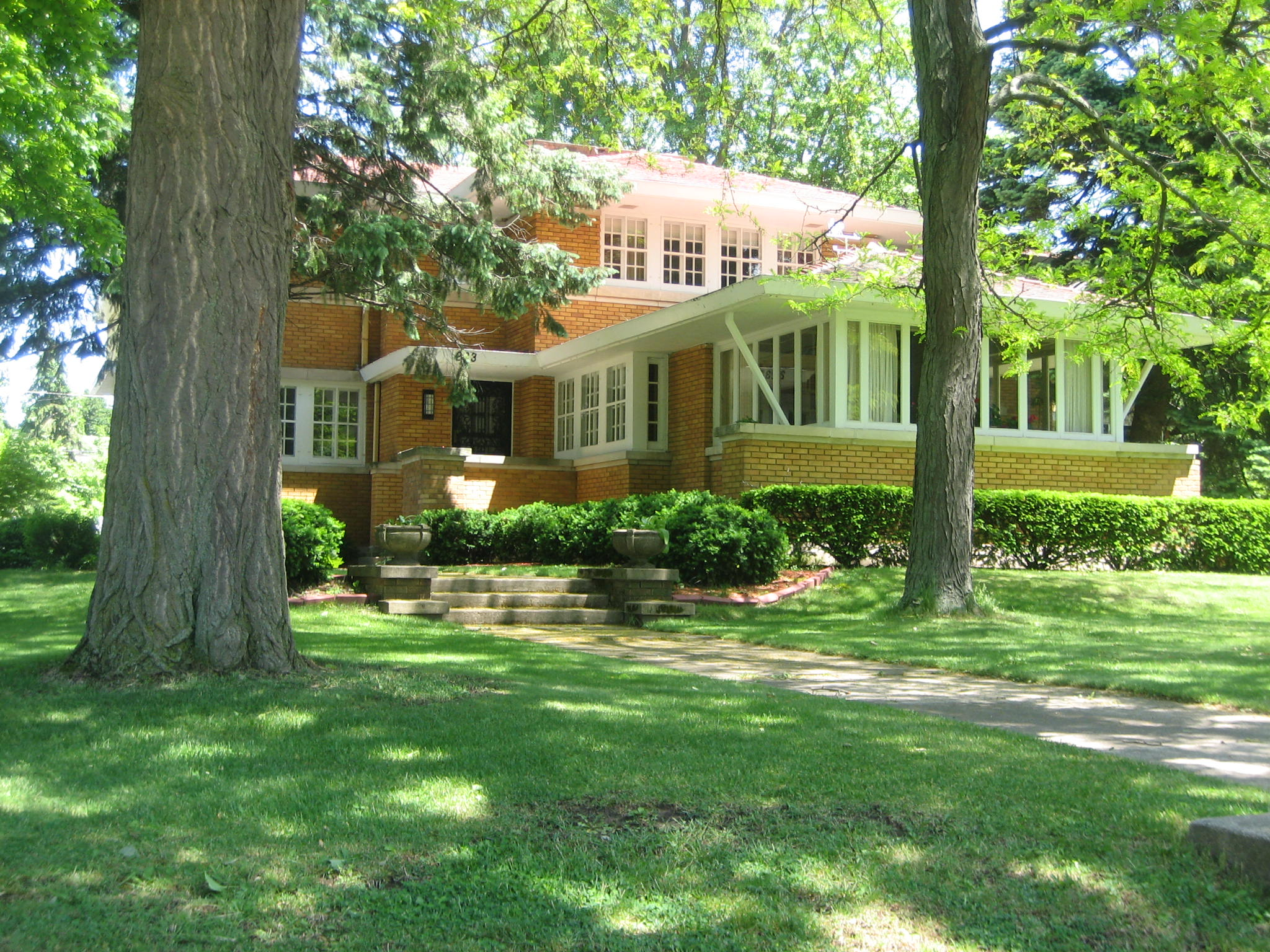
- Interactive map of the Andrew O. Anderson House area

General information
- Architectural style: Prairie style
- Location: DeKalb, DeKalb County, Illinois, United States
- Coordinates: 41.9347°N 88.7557°W
- Completed: 1916
- Client: Andrew O. Anderson

Design and construction
- Architect: John S. Van Bergen

The Andrew O. Anderson House, also known as the A. O. Anderson House, is a Prairie style house in the city of DeKalb, Illinois, United States. The house was designed by American architect John S. Van Bergen around 1913 and built around 1916. Van Bergen designed many Prairie homes and was an associate of famous architect Frank Lloyd Wright. Throughout its history the Anderson House has been mistaken for a residence designed by Wright. The Anderson House contains many elements common to both Prairie style in general as well as some of Wright's early Prairie designs. The house was constructed for DeKalb clothing merchant Andrew O. Anderson about 14 years after an original house project on the site fell through.

== History ==
The Anderson House was probably designed sometime around 1913 by Oak Park, Illinois native John S. Van Bergen, the house was not built until 1916. The history of the property, on Augusta Avenue in DeKalb, and Prairie style began in 1901 when another Oak Park architect, E.E. Roberts, was commissioned to design a home on the site for A.W. Fisk. Fisk was a business manager for the Ellwood Green Percheron horse business. Local news reports hyped the project, scheduled to be built in 1902, because Roberts was a well-known architect and probably the first of the Prairie School to receive a commission in DeKalb. The project never began, and the property stood empty until 1916.

In 1916 the lot was purchased by a local clothing merchant, Andrew O. Anderson, a Swedish immigrant. Anderson lived in several locations around DeKalb including the Glidden House Hotel before he and his brother Frank decided to build homes for their respective families. Oral tradition has held that the two brothers, and business partners held a friendly wager based on which brother found a better design for their home. Anderson sought out a noted Prairie style architect after being impressed by such a home in Maywood, Illinois. The home in Maywood that had impressed Anderson was designed by Van Bergen who had worked and studied under Solon S. Beman, Roberts, and Frank Lloyd Wright. By 1916, Van Bergen would become the best "imitator" of Wright and was noted for his residential work.

== Architecture ==
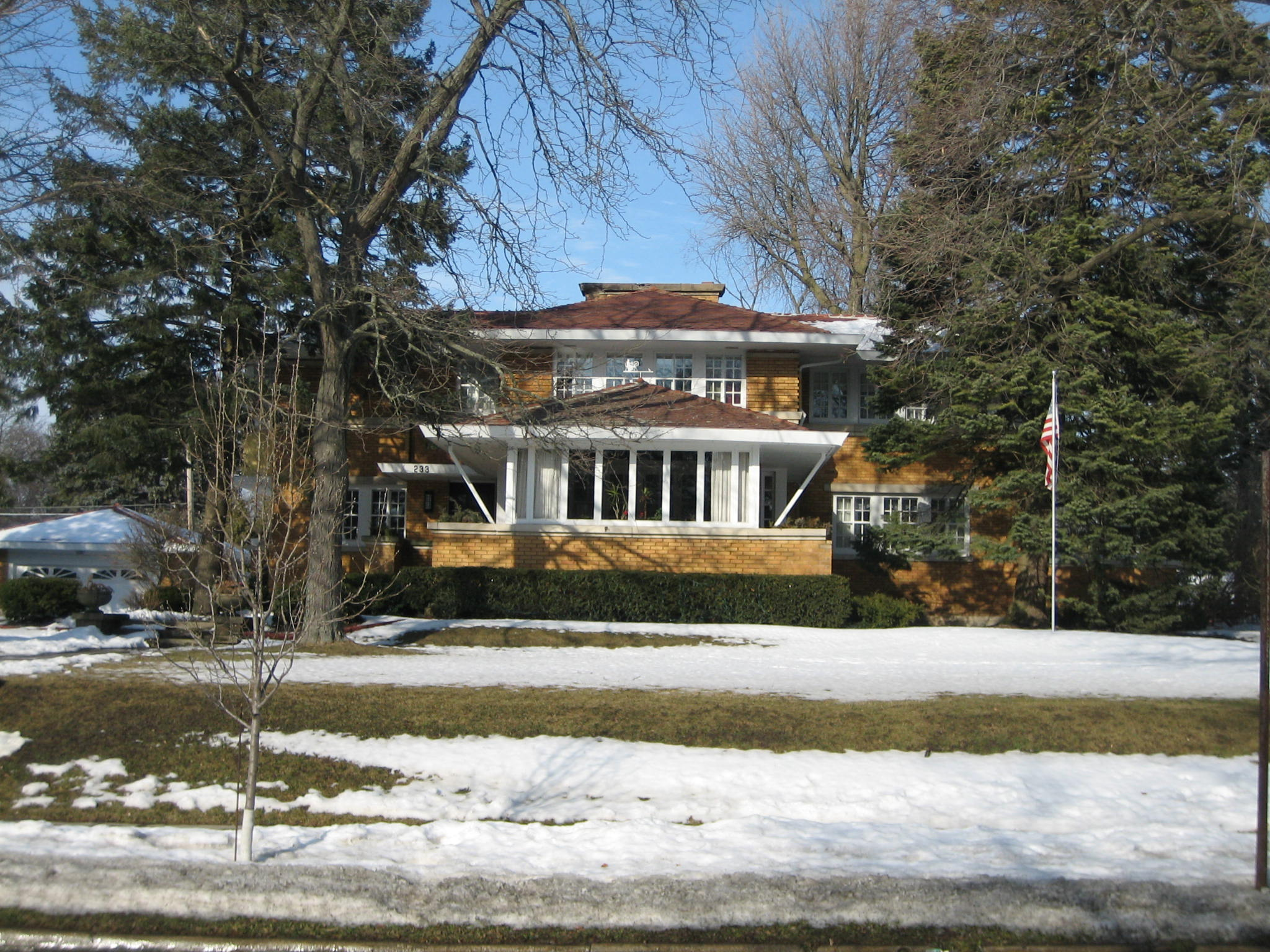
The broad overhanging eaves and low-to-the-ground horizontal nature of the house are of the Prairie School.

The house is a distinct example of the Prairie style of architecture first pioneered by Frank Lloyd Wright. The design, by Prairie School architect John S. Van Bergen, is nearly identical to one of his early commissions in Wilmette, Illinois, the C. Percy Skillin House. The major difference between the Anderson and Skillin Houses is found on the exterior facades. The Anderson House is clad in a yellow-orange brick and has stone sills and trim, in contrast with the Skillin House which has stucco cladding and cypress sills and trim.

Though the home has had alterations, it looks much the same as it did in a 1924 photograph. Alterations include window replacement; the existing four over four divided windows are out of character in Prairie style designs. On the front of the house the veranda has been enclosed and angled downspouts have been added which detract from the horizontal nature of the building.

The original home, as designed by Van Bergen has long been mistaken for a Frank Lloyd Wright design. The design reflects many elements of Prairie style that Wright was employed during the first decade of the 20th century. The brick clad exterior was one of the exterior coverings Wright used at the time and it is found prominently in the Anderson House. The house sits low to the ground, like many ideal Prairie style structures, and its front door is not immediately visible nor apparent, also common to Prairie homes. Other Prairie style features are found throughout the design: three walls of continuous casement windows, rooms and portions of rooms jut out in a horizontal manner and the living room has an entire wall occupied by a fireplace. The dominating fireplace is another Wright trademark. The house has distinct horizontal line and a low pitched red clay tile roof accented by Prairie style overhanging eaves. The yellow brick contrasts nicely with the stone and white painted trim.

Van Bergen's design for the Anderson House does deviate from the typical Wright-designed Prairie style house. Wright's early Prairie designs were characterized by the use of cubes and blocks; a good example is the James Charnley House in Chicago, a structure Wright designed while working for Adler and Sullivan. These elements are found in the Anderson House's rear elevation but the front of the house lacks these features of mature Prairie style.

== See also ==
- Allan Miller House
