= Mary Greenlees Yerkes Residence =

Coordinates: 41.89657°N 87.78722°W

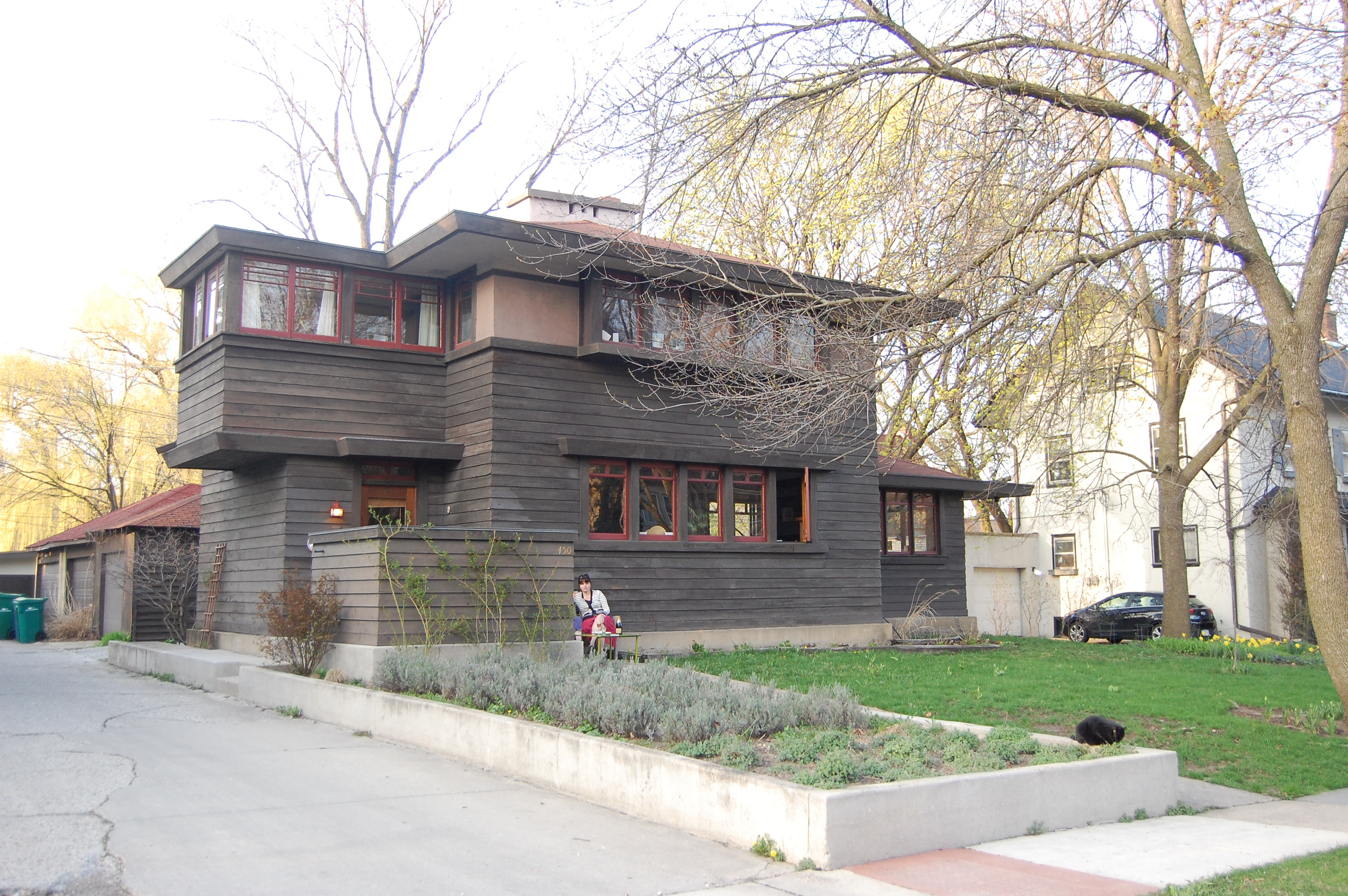
Yerkes house in fall.

The Mary Greenlees Yerkes House (also known as the "Mrs. Charles Yerkes House"), is a 1912 prairie style house in Oak Park, Illinois by American architect John S. Van Bergen for Mary Greenlees Yerkes, the widow of Charles Sherman Yerkes and mother of somewhat noted impressionist artist Mary Agnes Yerkes. The home was featured in a book by Patrick Cannon, titled Prairie Metropolis.

== Architecture ==
Recipient of a 2002 Oak Park Historic Preservation Award, the house is clad in cedar clapboards that go up to the second-floor windows and has a distinctive artist's studio that sticks out over the alleyway. The house features large overhanging eaves and a low hipped roof. The house is based on a variation of Wright's "Fireproof House for $5000" Plan, featuring square-centric massing with a central fireplace.

== Notable residents ==
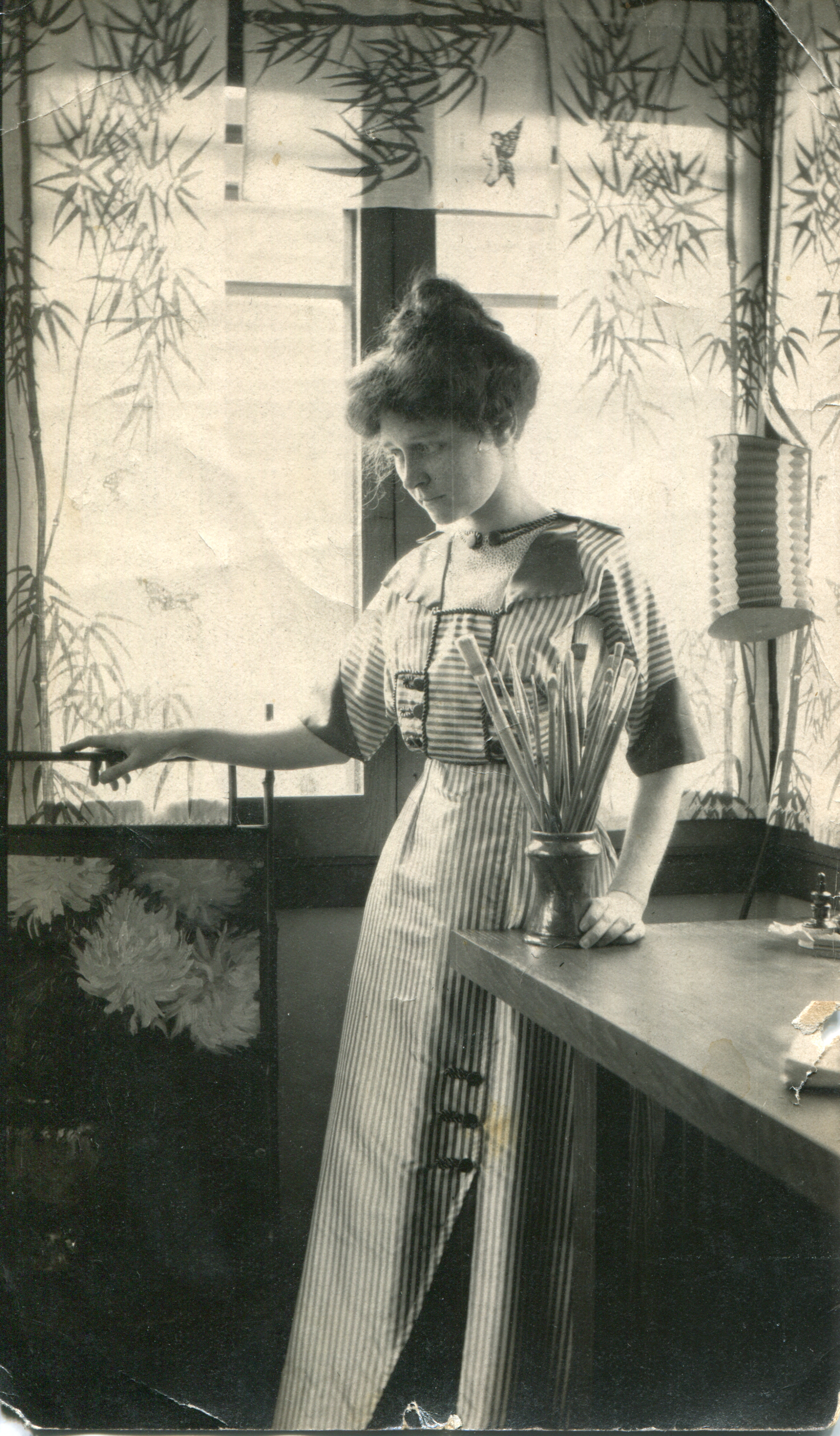
Yerkes the younger in the home's studio

Tax records show the Yerkes' living in the house until 1919. The house was later briefly resided in by Jim Ameche, brother of Don Ameche, and radio star. The house was bought in 1992, and restored by architect John Garrett Thorpe, who sold the house in 2010.
