= Richard Cluever House =

Historic house in Illinois, United States

- U.S. National Register of Historic Places
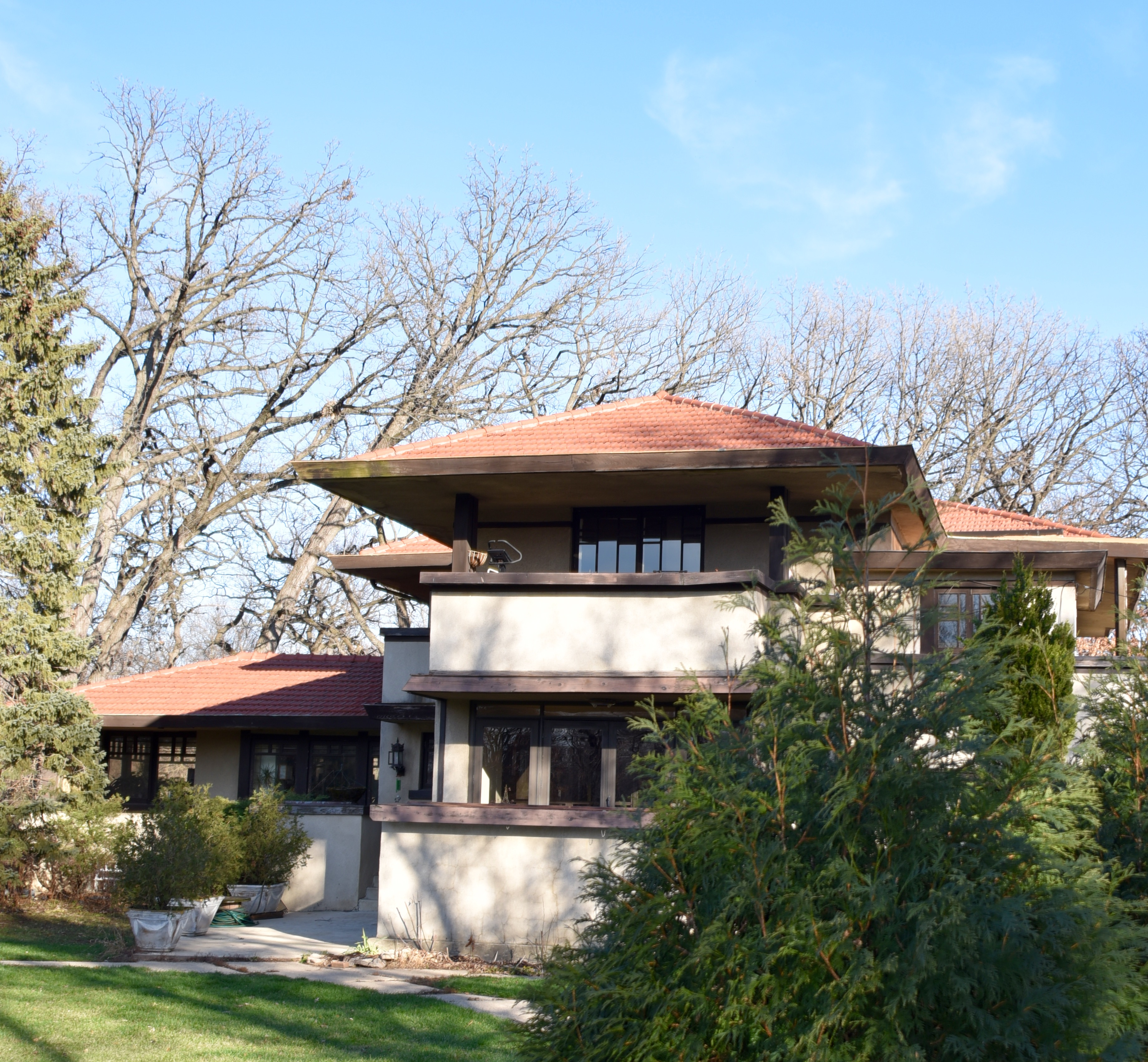

- Location within Chicago metropolitan area Location within Illinois Location within the United States
- Location: 601 1st Ave., Maywood, Illinois
- Coordinates: 41°53′35″N 87°50′01″W
- Area: 3.5 acres (1.4 ha)
- Built: 1913-14
- Architect: John S. Van Bergen
- Architectural style: Prairie School
- NRHP reference No.: 77000482
- Added to NRHP: November 17, 1977

The Richard Cluever House is a historic house at 601 1st Avenue in Maywood, Illinois. Built in 1913–14, the house was designed by noted Prairie School architect John S. Van Bergen. Van Bergen worked for Frank Lloyd Wright before starting his own practice, and like many of his early designs, the Cluever House closely resembles Wright's work. The house features many verandas and balconies and rows of casement windows, providing views of the nearby Des Plaines River. Landscape architect Jens Jensen designed the house's surroundings, which include a garden between the house and the river.

The house was added to the National Register of Historic Places on November 17, 1977.
