= Mary Agnes Yerkes =

American painter

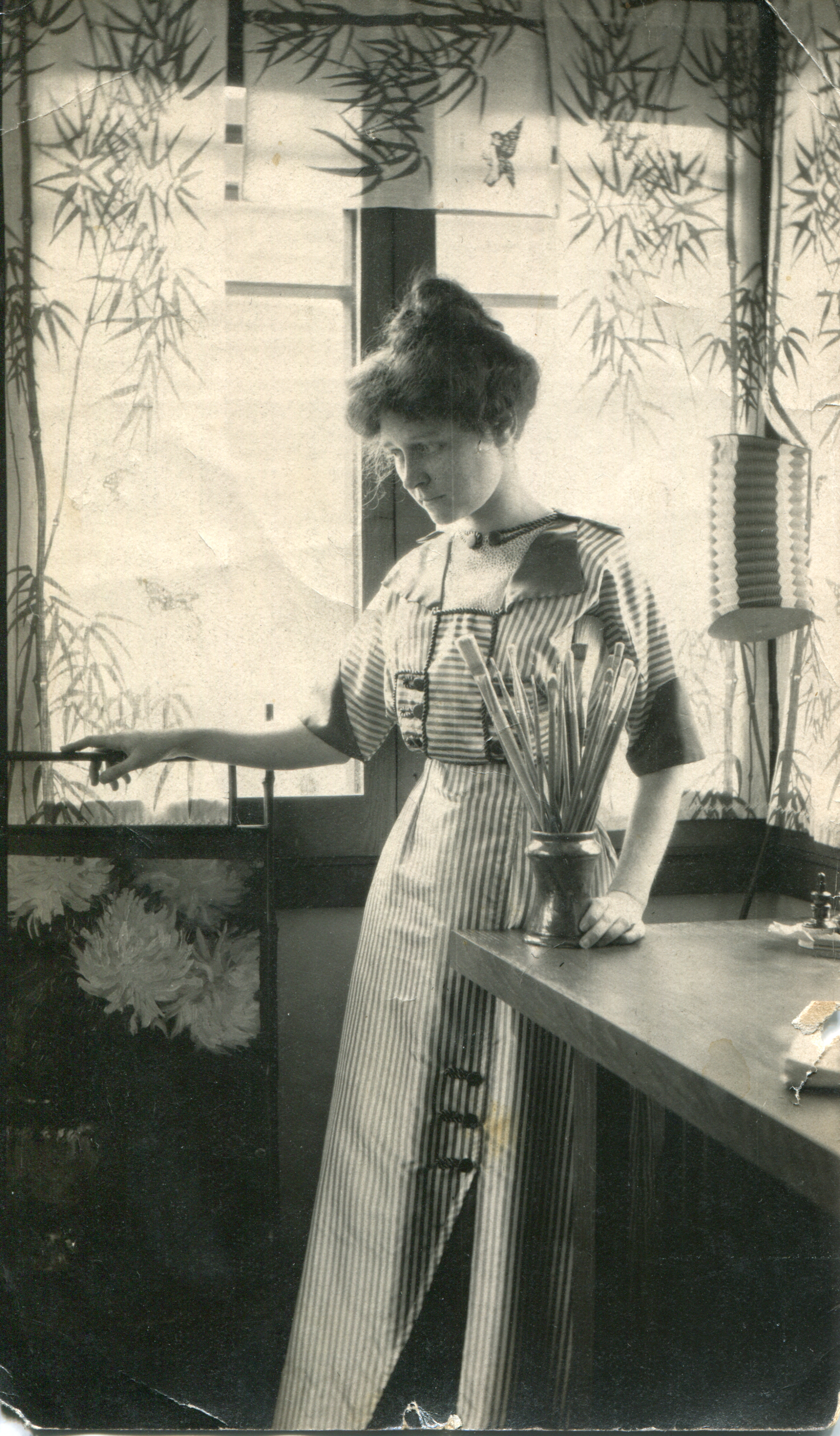
- Yerkes in her studio
- Born: August 9, 1886; Oak Park, Illinois, U.S.
- Died: November 8, 1989 (aged 103); San Mateo, California, U.S.
- Education: School of the Art Institute of Chicago, Rockford College, Chicago Academy of Fine Arts
- Known for: Painting
- Notable work: Crocker Art Museum, Illinois State Museum, Springville Museum of Art, Yosemite Museum NPS, Eiteljorg Museum, Whitney Gallery of Western Art, Tucson Museum of Art, Los Angeles County Museum of Art
- Movement: American Impressionism

Mary Agnes Yerkes, (/ˈjɜːrkiːz/ YUR-keez; August 9, 1886 – November 8, 1989), was an American impressionist painter, photographer and artisan. She was skilled in the media of oil, pastel and watercolor. Her professional career was cut short by the Great Depression, but she still continued to paint well into her nineties with a passion for her craft and nature. She is noted for her plein-air painting while camping the American West and its National Parks.

== Early life in Chicago ==
Mary Agnes Yerkes was born on August 9, 1886, in Oak Park, Illinois. Her parents, Charles Sherman Yerkes and Mary Greenlees Yerkes, had moved to their North Grove Avenue home a few years earlier from Ohio. She was the third child of four siblings; Reuben Archibald, Alice Agnew, and Charles Greenlees. Mary Agnes graduated from Oak Park and River Forest High School in 1906, and became an accomplished local artist.

Her father died in 1908. In 1913, her mother commissioned a house, the Mary Greenlees Yerkes Residence from architect John S. Van Bergen. Van Bergen was a draftsman and then a contemporary of Frank Lloyd Wright. Where most architects catered to wealthy clients, Van Bergen showed a particular interest in designing for both career women and artists. Their home was specifically designed by Van Bergen with an upstairs art studio for Mary Agnes. He even designed some of the first floor's interior trim in to frame some of Mary Agnes' mural paintings.

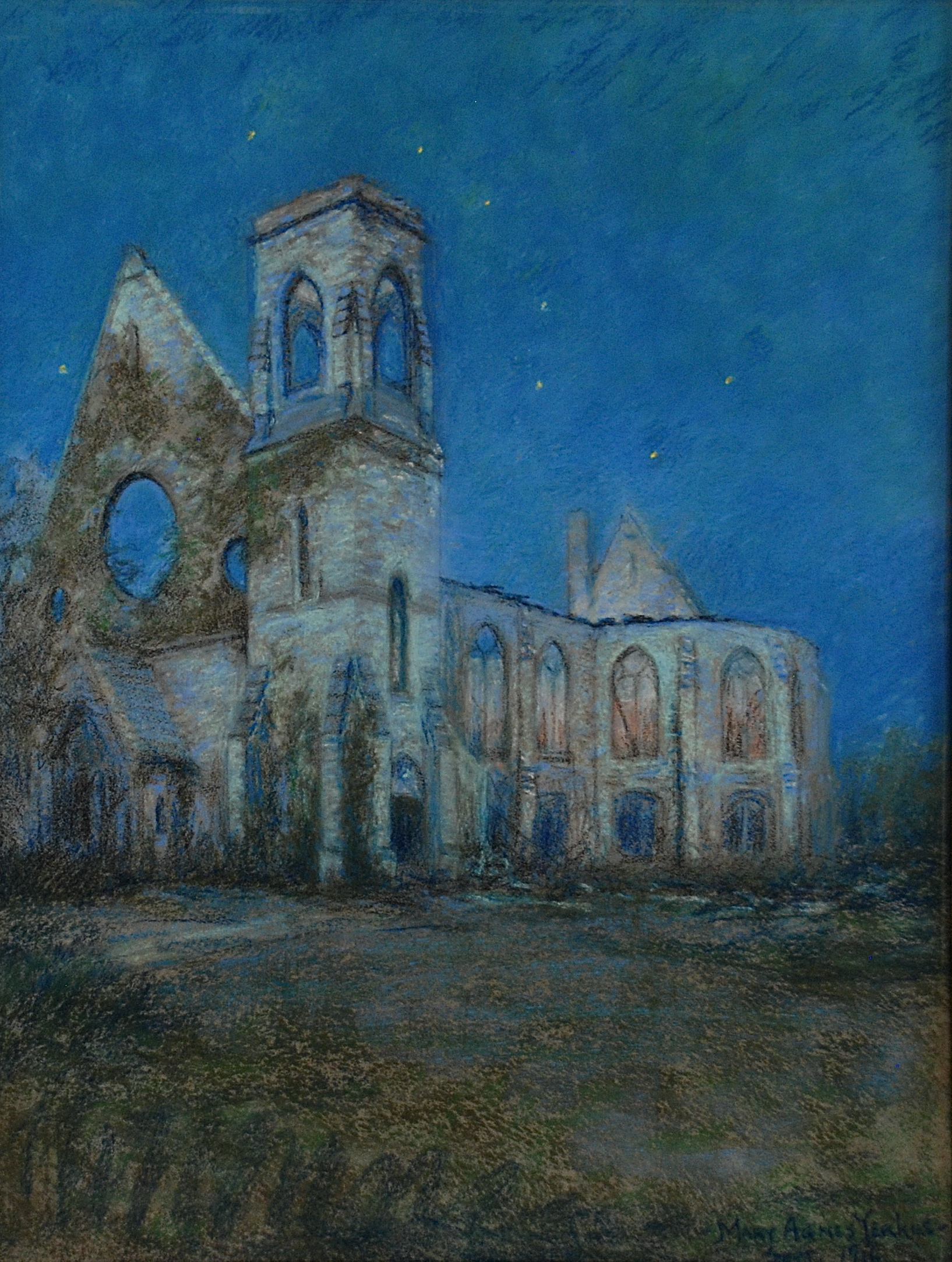
After the Fire by Mary Agnes Yerkes, 1915, pastel on canvas.

The Mary Greenlees Yerkes Residence is an Oak Park Preservation Trust award recipient. The Art Institute of Chicago and listings within Oak Park directories show her living at this 450 Iowa address from 1913 to 1919. Her mother continued living with Mary Agnes until her death in California, in 1935.

Yerkes took a two-year course in art history and decorative design at Rockford College. She then studied at the Academy of Fine Arts, where she also taught, and at the currently named School of the Art Institute of Chicago. She had special painting instruction under Wellington Reynolds, John W. Norton and Walter Marshall Clute, and participated in numerous exhibitions, including the exhibits of Chicago Artists, and the American Watercolor Society at the Art Institute of Chicago from 1912 to 1915.

Yerkes had a solo two-week showing in October 1915, about which a Chicago critic wrote:

Miss Yerkes' work shows remarkable versatility in both subject and medium, and she is unusually successful in doing many things well. The pictures are in oil and pastel and watercolor, and their subjects range from figures to landscape and still life, and from the daintiest spring to drifting winter snows. Thru all of her pictures, however, runs the same gift of clear, joyous, exquisite color. She will be very famous some day for her sense of color, and also for her rare gift of imagination.

== California and the Depression ==
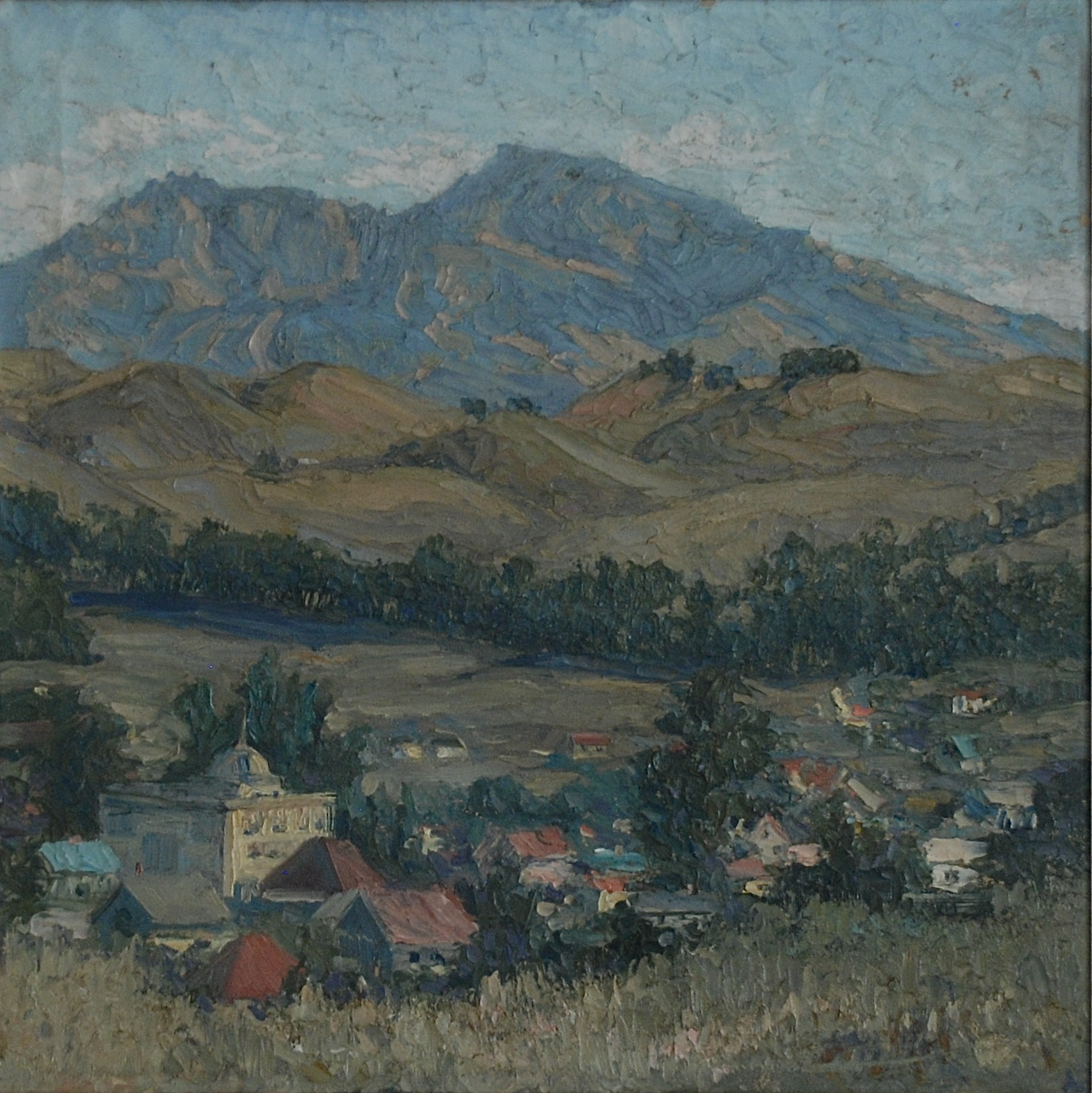
Mt. Shasta by Mary Agnes Yerkes, circa 1920s, oil on canvas.

"It was ... California, and more specifically San Francisco, that became the first mecca for women artists in the West".

In 1917, she married Navy Commander Archibald Nelson Offley, (Archie), and had one child, Mary Yerkes Offley, born in 1918 and who died at the age of 15 from nephritis. The early married life to a naval officer found her transferred to several ports: Portsmouth, Virginia, in the East, and San Diego, Vallejo, Long Beach, and San Francisco, along the coast of California. They eventually took up permanent residence in San Mateo, California, in the 1930s. This time period saw the onset of the Great Depression and she realized that a formal career in painting would be difficult: "The Great Depression of the 1930s and the consequent lack of funds to patronize art severely affected the careers of many artists, both men and women." A few artists during this time were lucky to find jobs through the Works Progress Administration's Federal Art Project in painting murals in public buildings, but for many artists their careers were crushed. This situation was confirmed by Yerkes' own journal, on one weekend's journey to San Francisco from San Mateo in 1935. Yerkes had an appointment with the art director of Gump's Department Store. She left very discouraged because the director said "nobody is buying art during these times". Their lifestyle was modest but far better than most during this period with Offley's secure position at the Office of Censorship in the Navy. Any free time and saved money went for putting gas in the car, to roam the countryside for her artistic exploration.

== Plein-air and the National Parks ==
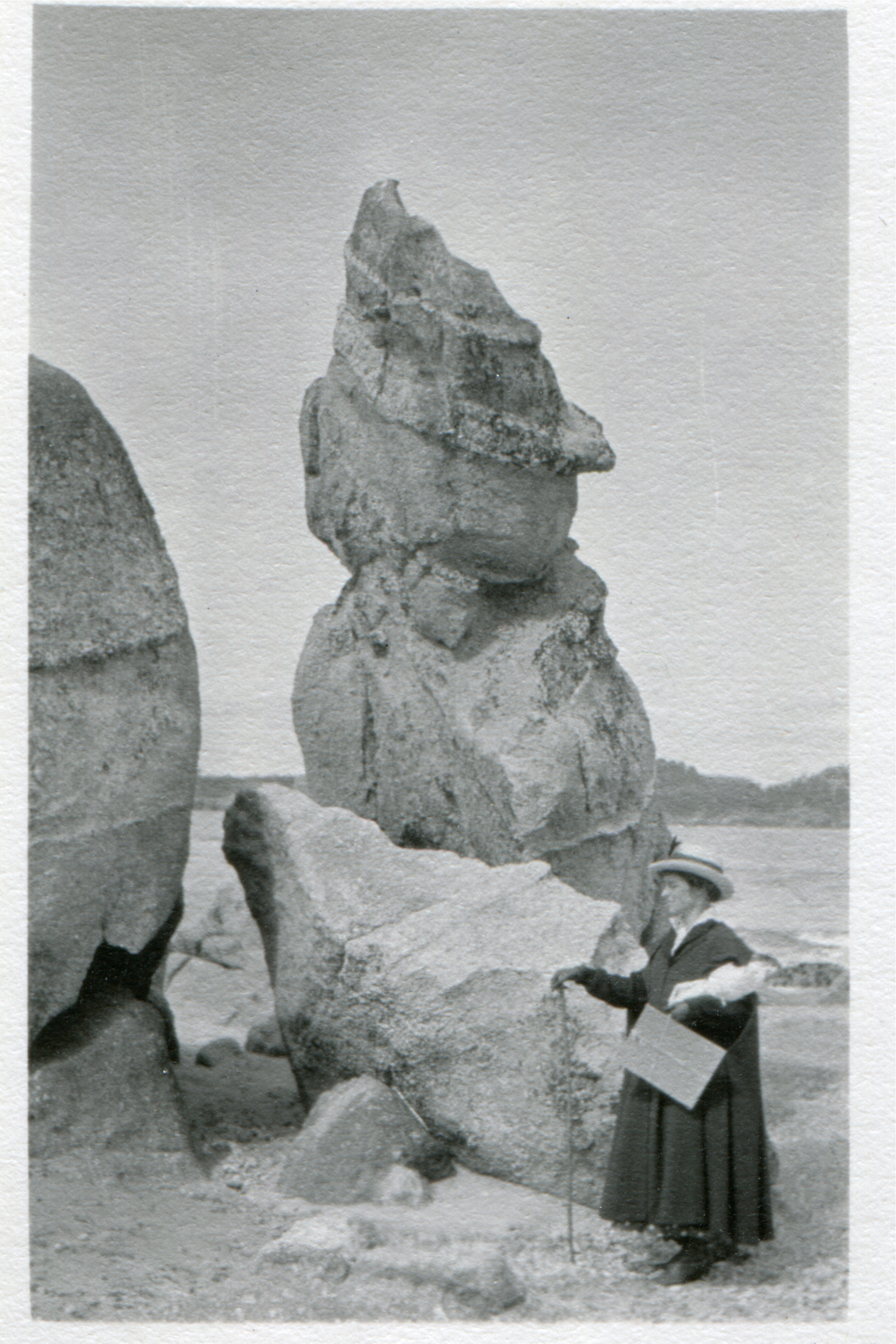
Mary Agnes plein-air painting at Carmel, Carmel Beach, California, circa 1920s.

"The two Yerkes oils in particular, [Crocker Art Museum], are wonderful examples of California Impressionism, and by a woman, which makes them even more rare." – Scott A. Shields, Ph.D., Associate Director / Chief Curator, Crocker Art Museum.

With Northern California as a permanent base, Yerkes now painted for herself. She had ready access to some of the West's greatest natural wonders. She traveled, camped and painted from Yosemite Valley to Santa Fe and from Tucson to Alberta, Canada. Travelogues, kept by her husband, showed detailed records of these adventures all throughout the 1930s and 40s. They toured in their specially modified 1920s Buick which was equipped with extra storage pockets and a canvas sling for an interior bed. Yerkes, her husband, and their daughter Mary, (nicknamed Min), spent weekends and holidays traveling on dirt roads to explore the inner sanctums of the newly established National Parks. Extended expeditions took them several times throughout the West and they toured many National Parks including; Crater Lake, Mt Rainier, Glacier, Yellowstone, Grand Teton, Rainbow Bridge and Arches, Mesa Verde, Joshua Tree, Death Valley, Grand Canyon, Organ Pipe Cactus National Monument and Yosemite, as well as the Oregon, Washington and California coasts. Yosemite Valley was a particular favorite subject matter and destination because of its beauty and proximity to San Mateo.

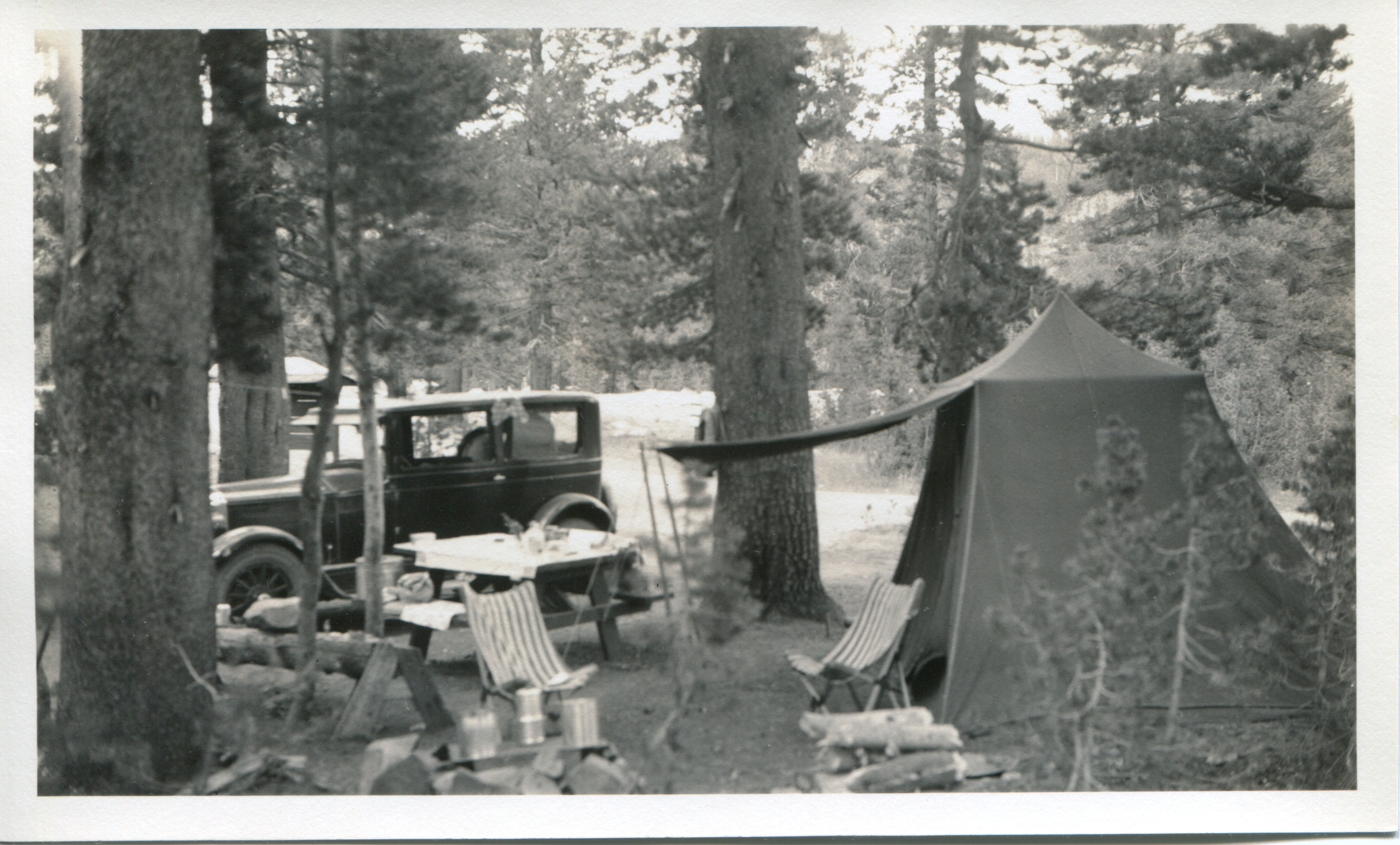
Mary Agnes camping in Yosemite with their 1920s Buick, Yosemite Valley, California, circa 1936.

Yerkes mostly painted en plein-air but she also worked at home in a studio. Numerous photographs were taken by her on each trip to be used as reference later. Archie died in 1945 and Yerkes' painting efforts took a pause. They resumed in the 1950s with encouragement from her second partner, Albert Cobb, although she did not remarry. Yerkes continued to camp and paint the American West well into the 1970s and into her nineties. She also hooked pictorial rugs, wove fabric for her own clothes and accessories, and carved furniture in the same Southwestern and natural motifs she loved to paint. She died in San Mateo on November 8, 1989, at the age of 103. After decades of painting, over [150] of her paintings adorned her own walls at the time of her death. The art world knows her as "Mary Agnes" Yerkes but she, as well as her family members, used "Agnes".

== Gallery ==
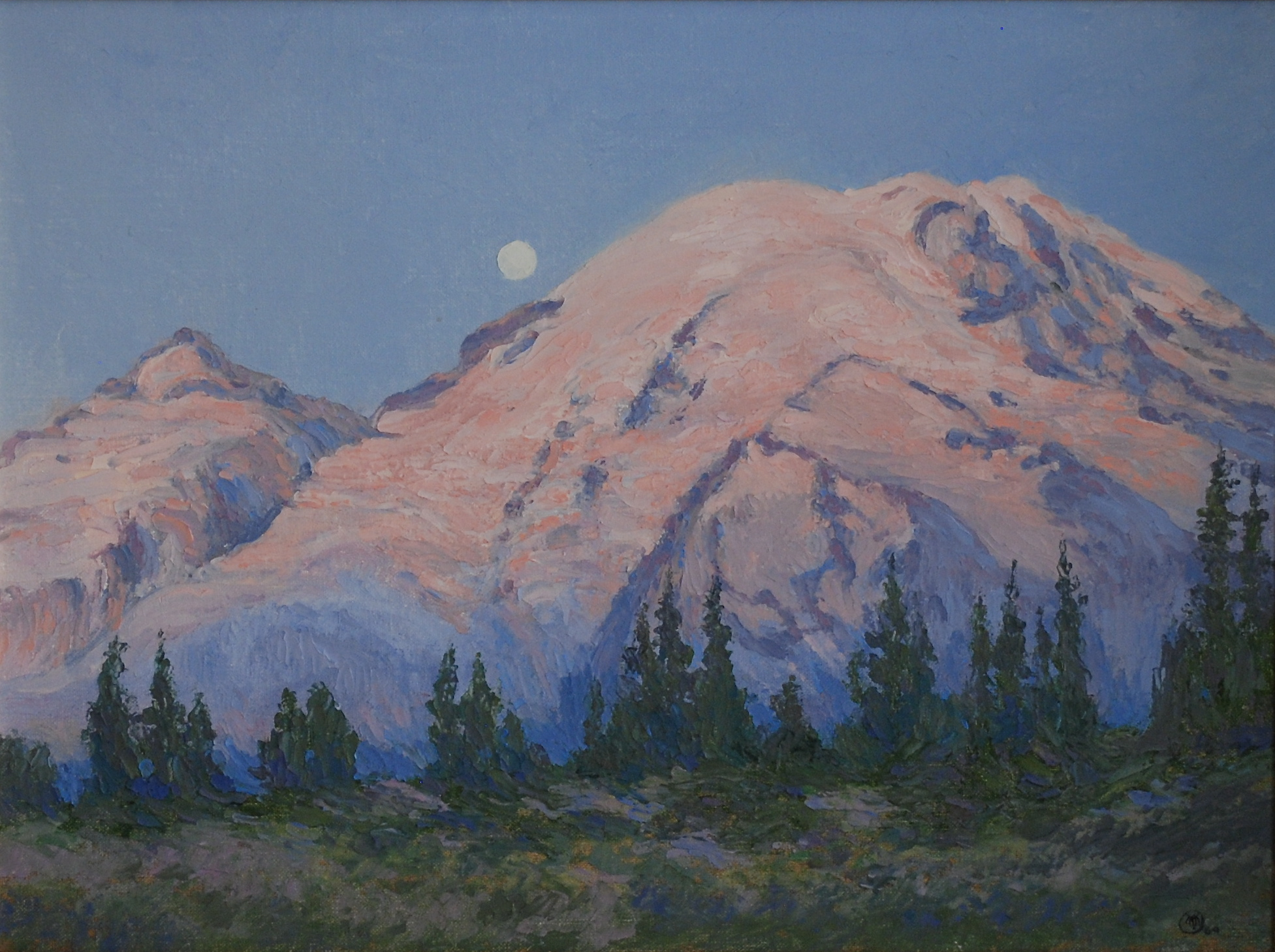
Moon Set and Sunrise Glow by Mary Agnes Yerkes, 1964, oil on canvas board.

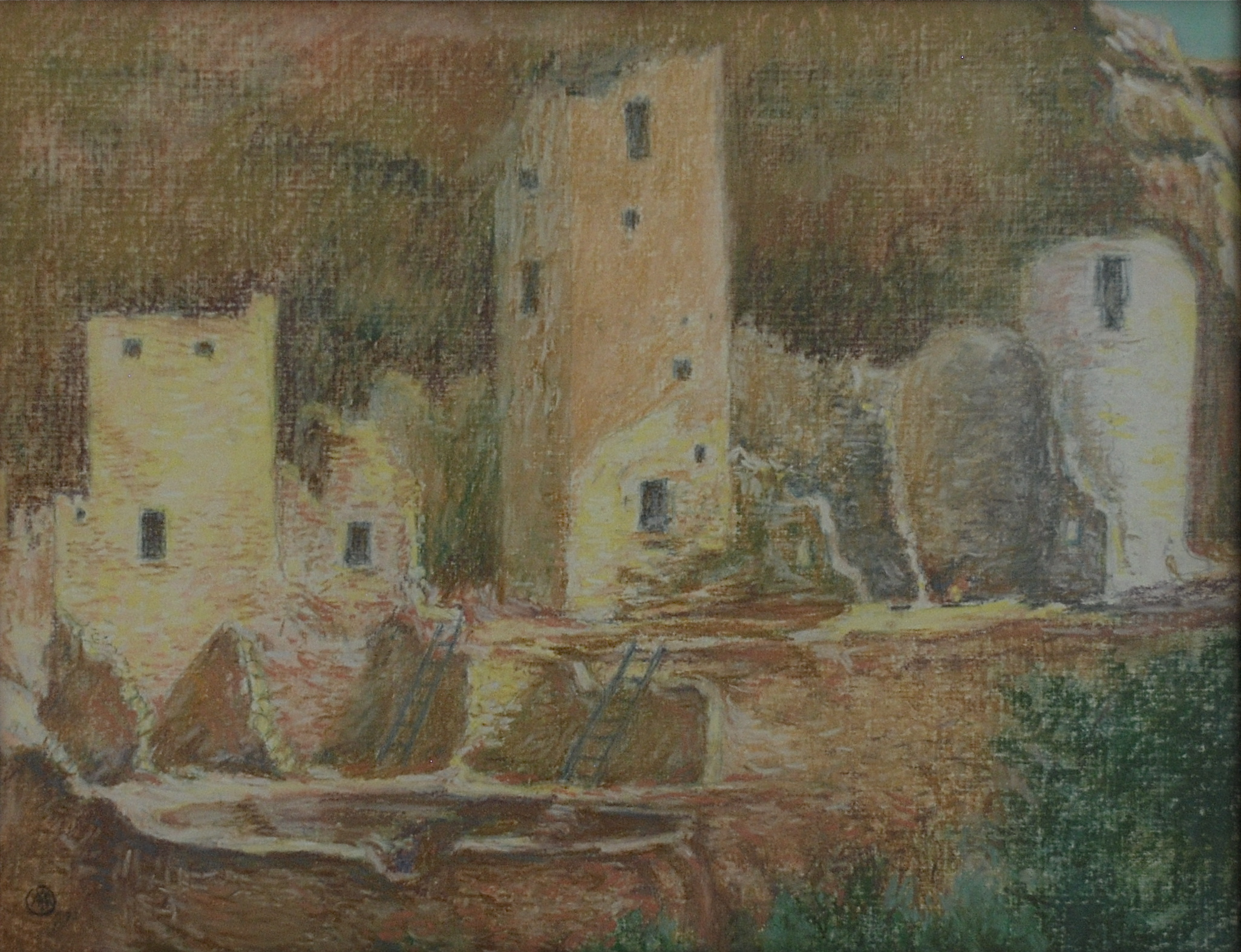
Cliff Palace by Mary Agnes Yerkes, 1973, pastel on canvas board.

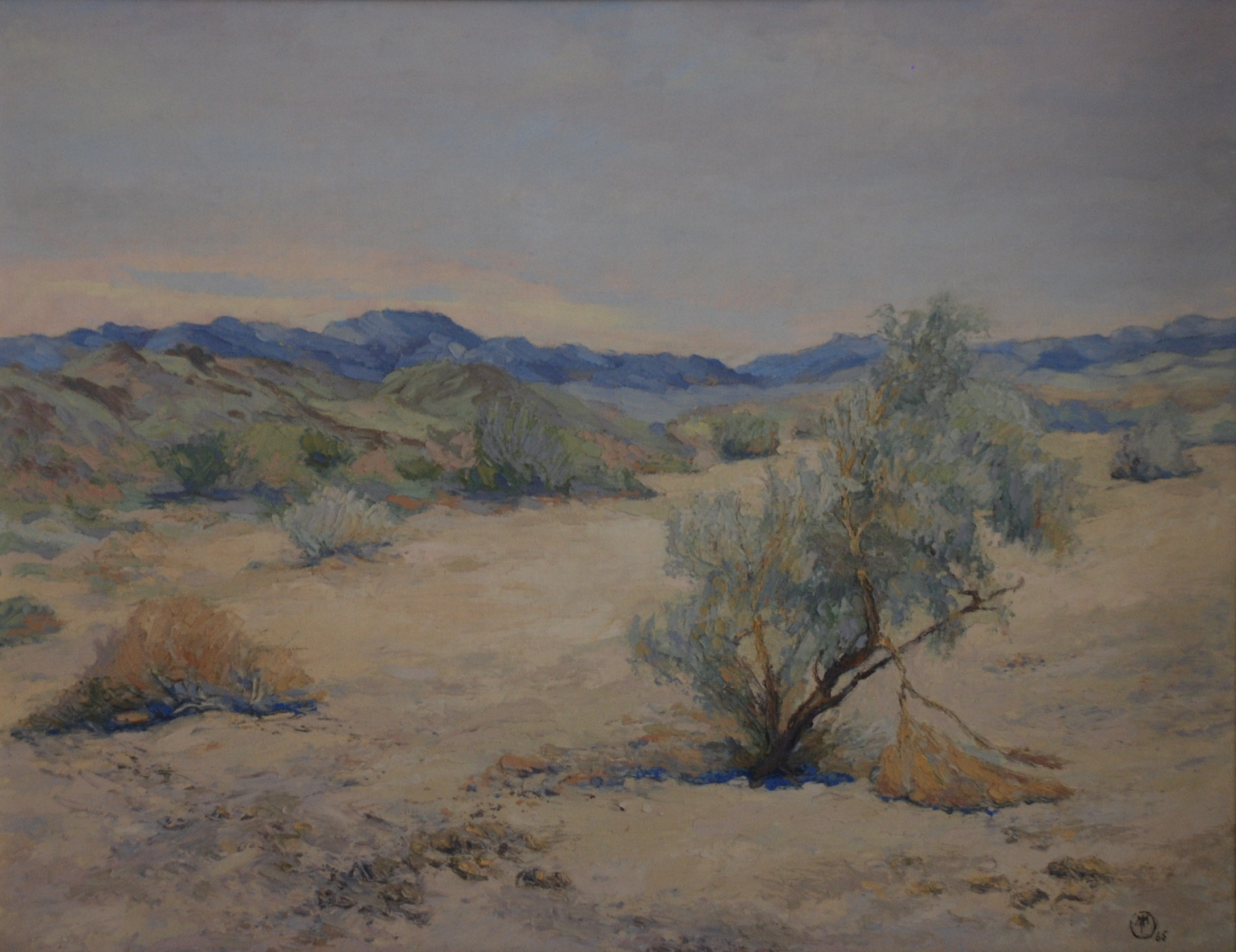
Early in the Day in Desert Quiet by Mary Agnes Yerkes, 1965, oil on canvas board.

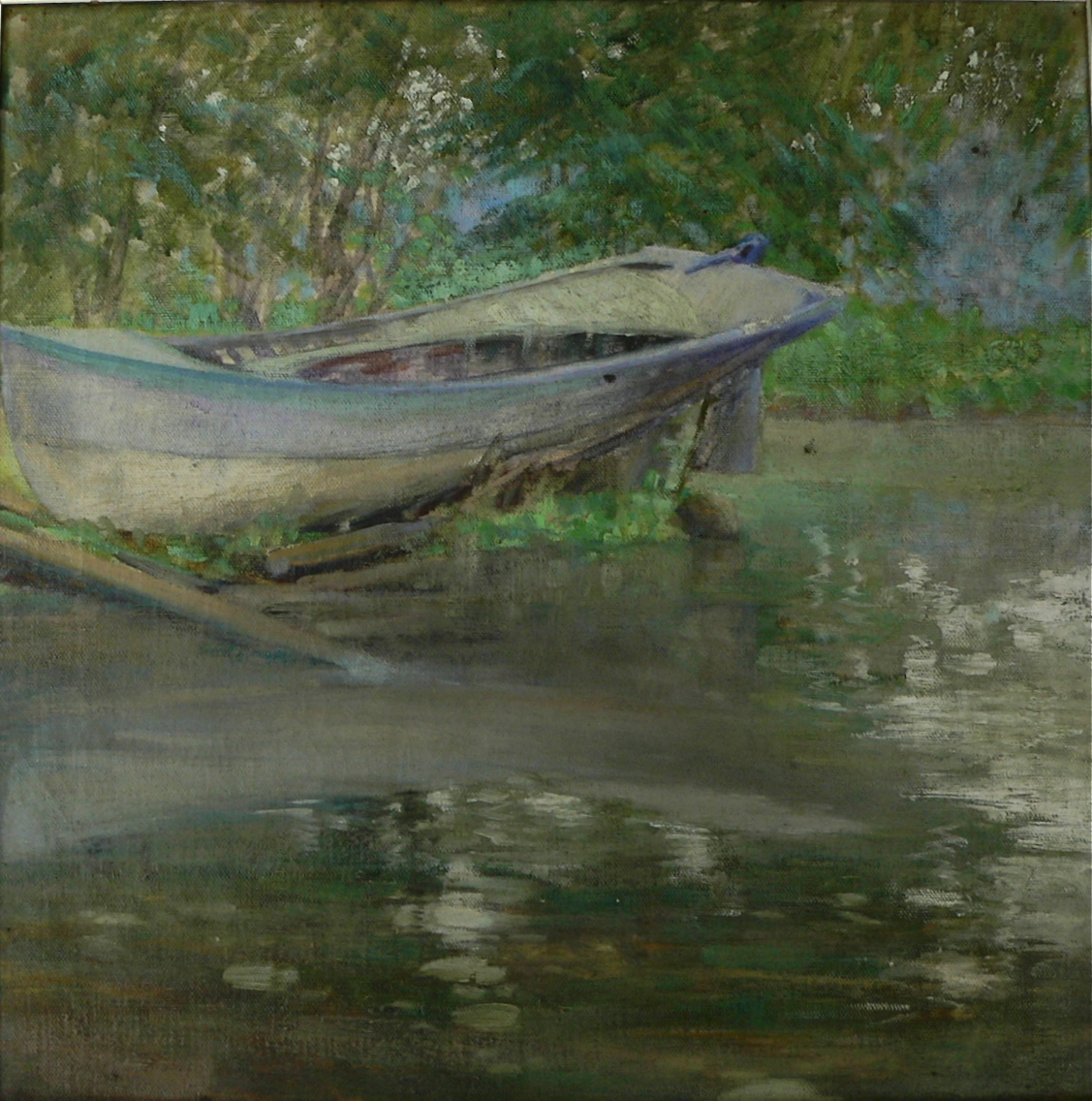
Blue Boat by Mary Agnes Yerkes, circa 1920, oil on canvas.

== Signature styles ==
"Although many rejected the Victorian role for women, few divorced themselves completely from its influence .... And frequently they signed their works with monograms ...."

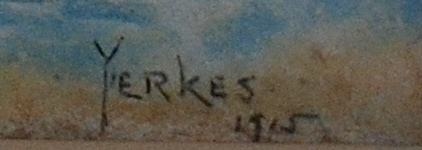
Signature Style 1910–1920.

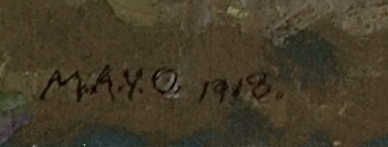
Signature Style for sketches.

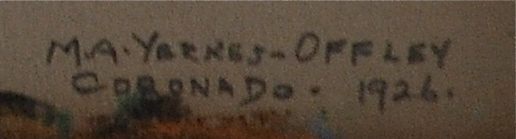
Signature Style 1920s-1940s.

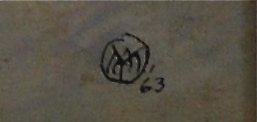
Signature Style 1950s-1970s Monogram.
