= John S. Van Bergen =

American architect

- Born: October 2, 1885; Oak Park, Illinois
- Died: December 20, 1969 (aged 84)
- Occupation: Architect
- Buildings: Allan Miller House; Andrew O. Anderson House; Mary Greenlees Yerkes Residence

John Shellette Van Bergen (October 2, 1885 – December 20, 1969) was an American architect born in Oak Park, Illinois. Van Bergen started his architectural career as an apprentice draftsman in 1907. In 1909 he went to work for Frank Lloyd Wright at his studio in Oak Park. At Wright's studio he did working drawings for and supervised the Robie House and the Mrs. Thomas Gale House. Van Bergen designed prairie style homes in the Chicago area, mostly in the suburbs of Oak Park and River Forest. His home designs are recognized as excellent examples of Prairie style architecture and several are listed as local landmarks. A few of his homes are listed on the U.S. National Register of Historic Places.

== Early life ==
John S. Van Bergen was born October 2, 1885, to William and Ella Van Bergen, one of four children. At the time the Van Bergen family resided in a home on Euclid Avenue in Oak Park, a building that no longer exists. The Van Bergens then moved into the present day 500 block of Fair Oaks when a young John Van Bergen began to show an interest in architecture.

In 1897, across the street from the Van Bergen family home, the Frank Lloyd Wright designed Rollin Furbeck House was constructed and four years later the William G. Fricke House went up nearby as well. This further influenced the young Van Bergen. Van Bergen's mother was friends with Wright's mother, Anna, and Van Bergen's third grade teacher was Wright's sister, Maginel. In 1901 John Van Bergen began high school at the old Oak Park and River Forest High School, which was then located on Lake Street. During high school Van Bergen produced his earliest known drawing, a map of the high school district commissioned by the district superintendent. The map was dated June 24, 1904. After high school Van Bergen spent time in Hollywood, California. When he returned from California he soon found an architectural apprenticeship.

== Career ==
John Van Bergen began his career as an apprentice draftsman working with Walter Burley Griffin in 1907. Van Bergen's father had been friends with Griffin's father for many years and when the young architect needed a draftsman in his office, in January 1907, he took on Van Bergen as an apprentice. Late in his life Van Bergen recalled Griffin as "not only a skillfully trained architect but also a great teacher for me. He had no end of patience for a very poor draftsman." Van Bergen also found the training he received under Griffin useful, recounting in 1966:

[The] Training I had with Walter couldn't have been better for me as I was the only one in his office and I had to do something of everything. Walter took great pains in explaining things to me - pains that no other architect ever took.

Van Bergen remained with Griffin as his only apprentice until October 1908. After he left Griffin's office Van Bergen enrolled in Chicago Technical College to work toward his architectural license, at the same time he went to work for E.E. Roberts, an architect closely associated with the Prairie School. In 1909 he left Chicago Technical College and began working with architect Frank Lloyd Wright. He joined Wright before he was a licensed architect and went to work in his studio. Van Bergen was the last architect added to Wright's studio and while there he was put in charge of finishing many Frank Lloyd Wright projects. Working for Wright he did working drawings and was supervisor for the Robie House and the Mrs. Thomas Gale House. Van Bergen designed many Prairie style residences in and around Chicago, especially in the suburbs of Oak Park and River Forest. Of the architects closely associated with Wright, Van Bergen and Francis Conroy Sullivan were the two least known. Van Bergen's work was very much cast in a similar manner to that of Wright's early Prairie work and some of Van Bergen's designs are among the most striking within the school. When Wright left for Europe in late 1909 Van Bergen, along with Isabel Roberts, remained behind to close Wright's studio and help end the Oak Park, Illinois phase of Wright's career. After Van Bergen left Wright's studio he briefly worked for another former Wright employee, William Eugene Drummond.

He received his architect's license in 1911, left Drummond's practice, and started his own practice. Van Bergen's first design commission was for the Elizabeth Manson House in Oak Park. The permit for the home was dated August 9, 1911, and the permit for the garage, which Van Bergen also designed was dated December 30, 1911. The original garage has since been replaced. While the interior design is still immature the home's massing and flow already have the unique subtlety characteristic of Van Bergen's work.

Little research has been done on Van Bergen's career because a 1964 fire destroyed his Santa Barbara, California home along with many of his architectural drawings and records. For many years the assumption by those who studied the Prairie School was that there were few records of Van Bergen's work thus the search would be fruitless. Despite this fire, researchers are rediscovering Van Bergen's work, much of which still remains standing.

== Style and works ==
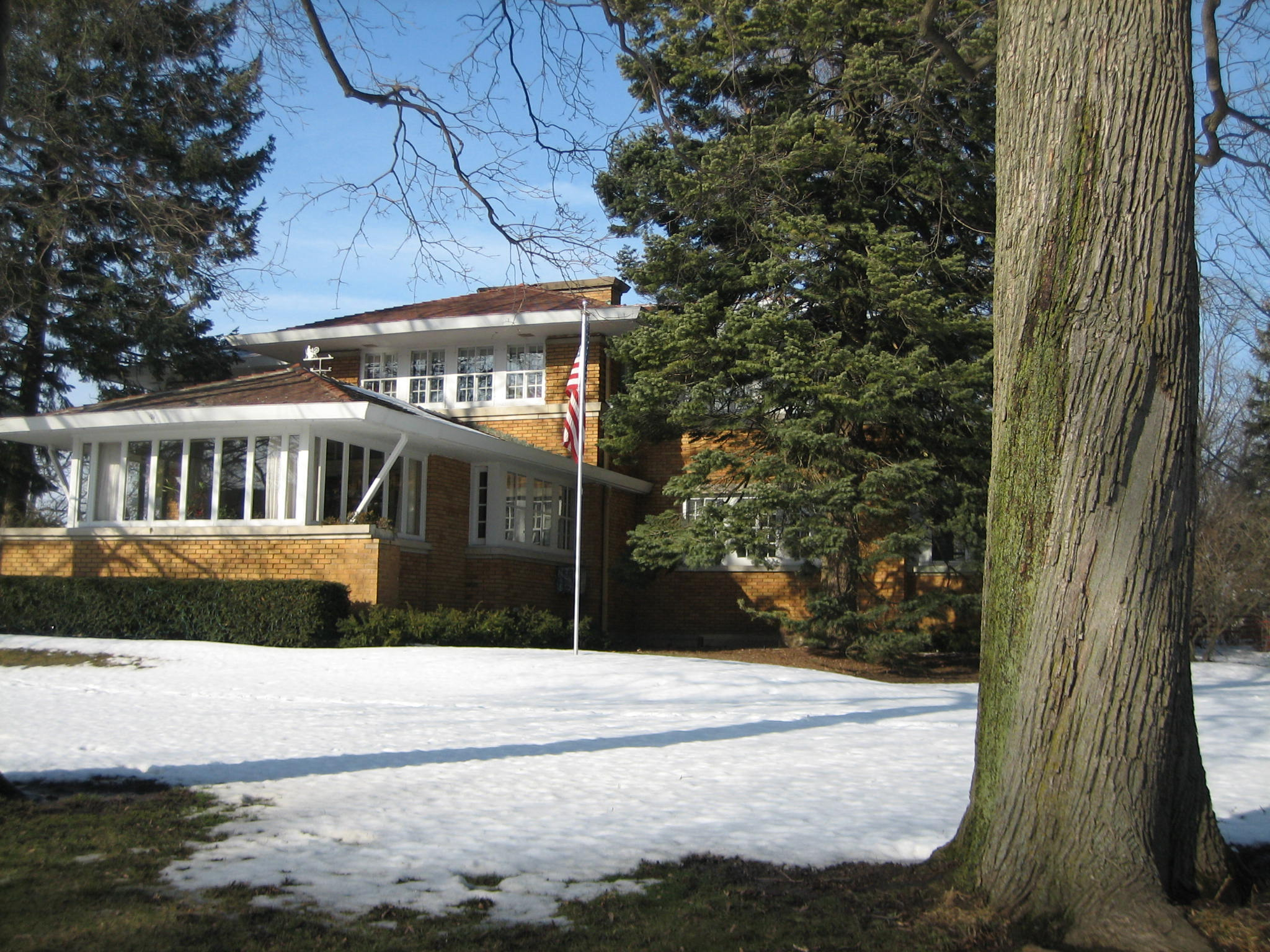
The c. 1913 Prairie style Andrew O. Anderson House in DeKalb, Illinois

Van Bergen designed Prairie style homes, influenced by Frank Lloyd Wright, as demonstrated in this quote from Van Bergen:

Since the American architect has a great opportunity as a leader of the people toward honesty, simplicity and directness, he can educate their tastes and control, to a great extent, their morals and happiness.

Van Bergen's homes can be found throughout northern Illinois. Three of his Prairie style homes with nearly identical layouts can be found in the A.O. Anderson House in DeKalb, Illinois, the Max and Cecile Przyborski Residence in North Chicago, Illinois and the C. Percy Skillin Residence in Wilmette, Illinois. All three buildings are almost identical and were all probably built around 1913.

Another notable home designed by Van Bergen can be found in the Chicago suburb of Maywood, Illinois. The Richard Cluever House is a large estate which not only represents an exceptionally large Prairie style design but also notable for its landscape design which was created by Jens Jensen, famous landscape architect. The landscaping includes an artificial pond and stream complete with a limestone bridge. The stream's water is pumped from the nearby Des Plaines River. In his hometown of Oak Park Van Bergen designed the Charles Flitcraft House in 1914 and then in 1923 he designed a unique, underground garage addition for the home. The driveway retaining wall is made of the original rough-cut and stratified limestone, a style Van Bergen used in many houses after the 1920s.

The renowned Prairie style, “Fireproof House for $5,000”, was a design developed by Frank Lloyd Wright and later adapted by Van Bergen in his practice. The design was intended to serve as an attractive model of space and cost efficiency. Van Bergen designed many as sixteen variations of this plan in Oak Park alone from 1911 through 1923. Built in 1913, “The Mary Greenlees Yerkes Residence” is a fine example of this. What also adds to the unique character of this home is a specifically designed upstairs art studio, for then noted local artist Mary Agnes Yerkes, over its main entrance. The "Mary Greenlees Yerkes Residence" is an Oak Park Preservation Trust 2001 award recipient.

Prairie style homes designed by Van Bergen are often considered "excellent" or "outstanding" examples of the style and some of them have been declared local landmarks. The city of Chicago declared the Miller House, a 1915 example of Van Bergen's Prairie style on South Paxton Avenue, a landmark on December 1, 1993. The Miller House was listed on the U.S. National Register of Historic Places in 1991. In the suburb of Wilmette the Bresbach House, another example of Van Bergen's 1910s work, is a local landmark.

== List of projects ==
- Dudley Crafts Watson House addition at 291 Marshman (1926)
- Albert J. Kurtson house 266 Delta (1928)
- Mrs. Frank Geyso Houses 450 and 456 Woodland

John S. Van Bergen House at 234 Cedar Avenue (1927)

- F. W. Van Bergen Houses at 1184 Wade (1927)
- Stoddard House at 290 Cedar Avenue
- Moldener & Humer Furriers at 1894 Sheridan Road (1926)
- John Shaver House at 326 Delta (1935)

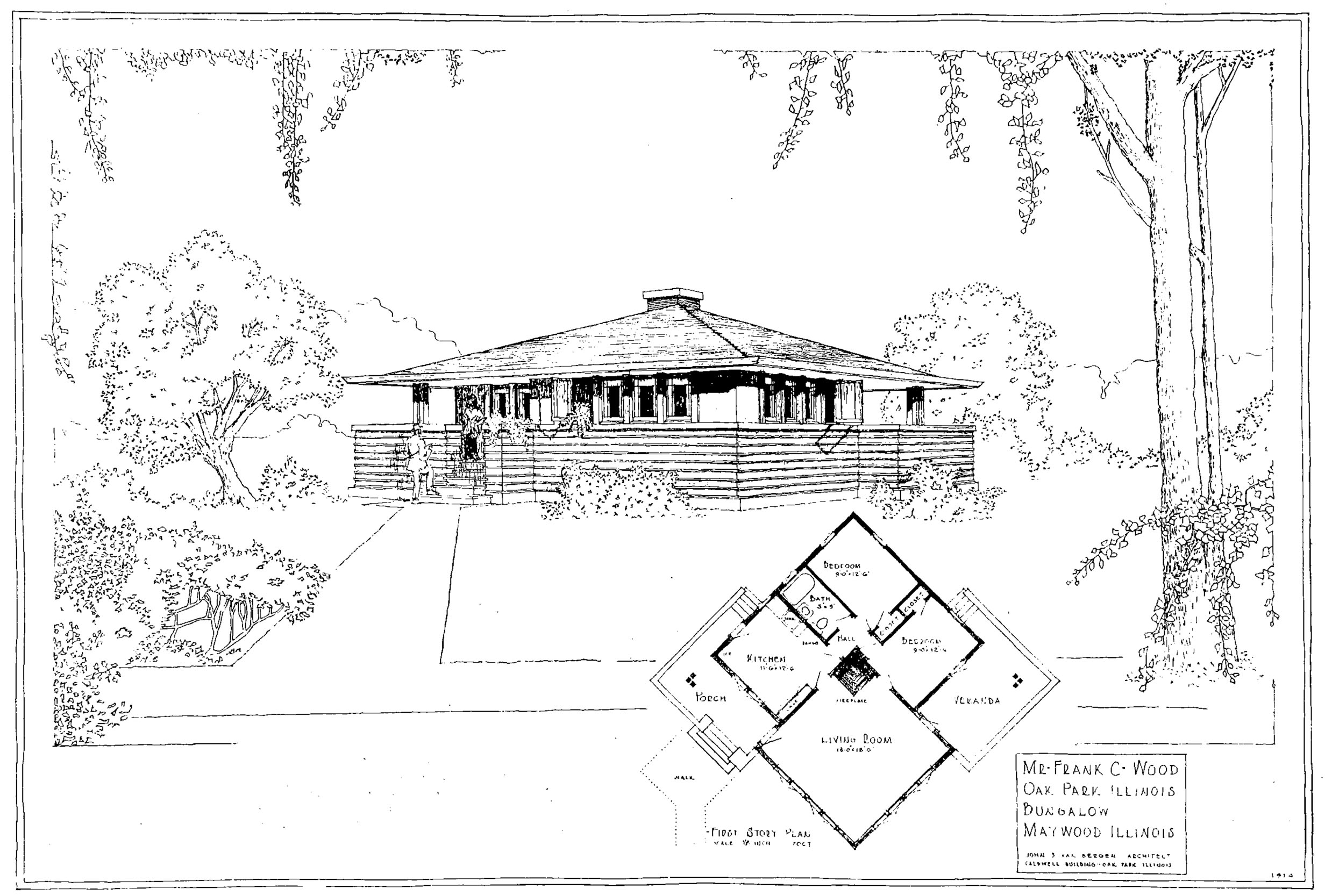
Frank Wood Bungalow; Maywood, Illinois 1914

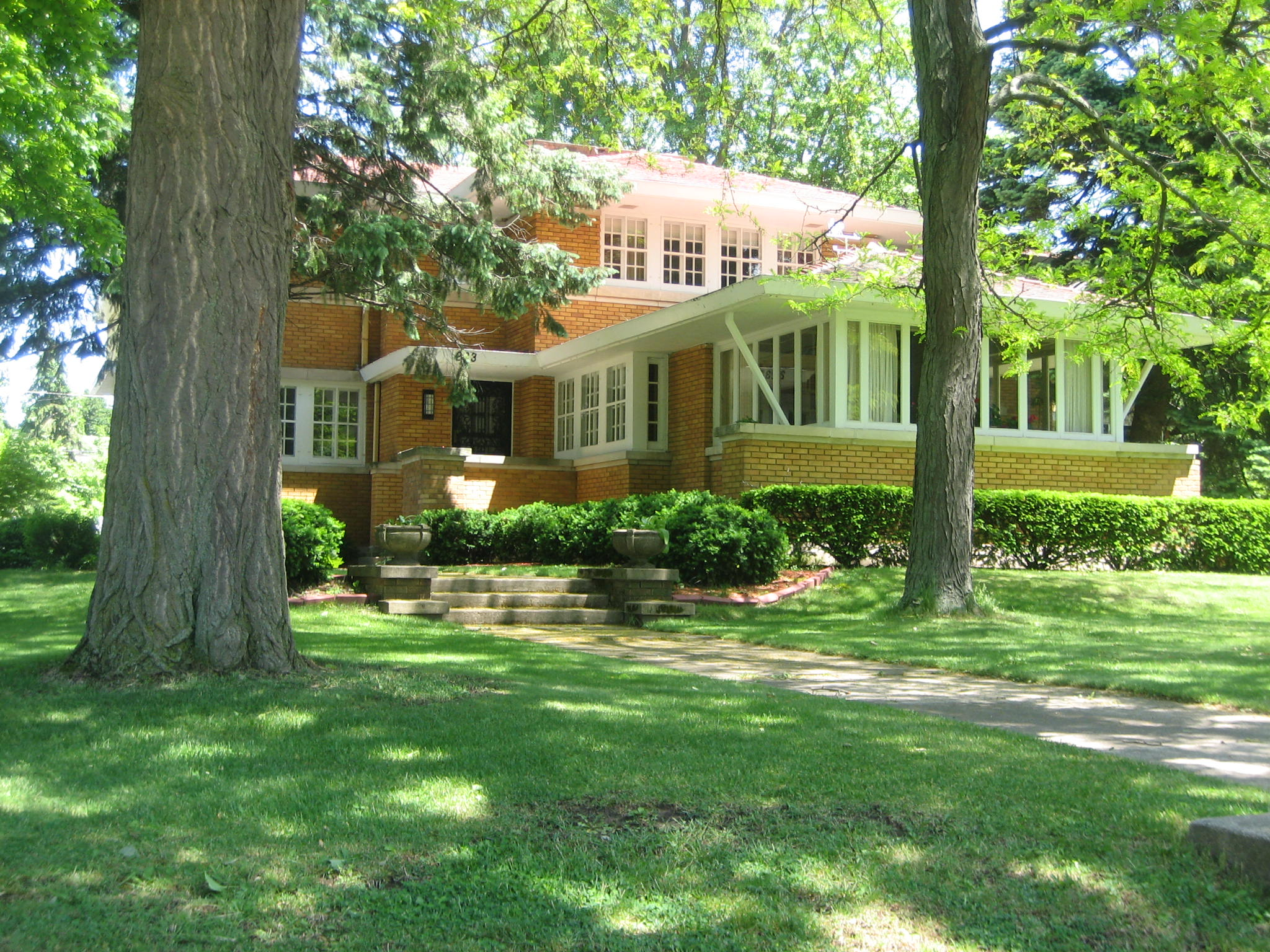
Anderson House; DeKalb, Illinois 1913-16
