= Allan Miller House =

Historic house in Illinois, United States

- U.S. National Register of Historic Places
- Chicago Landmark
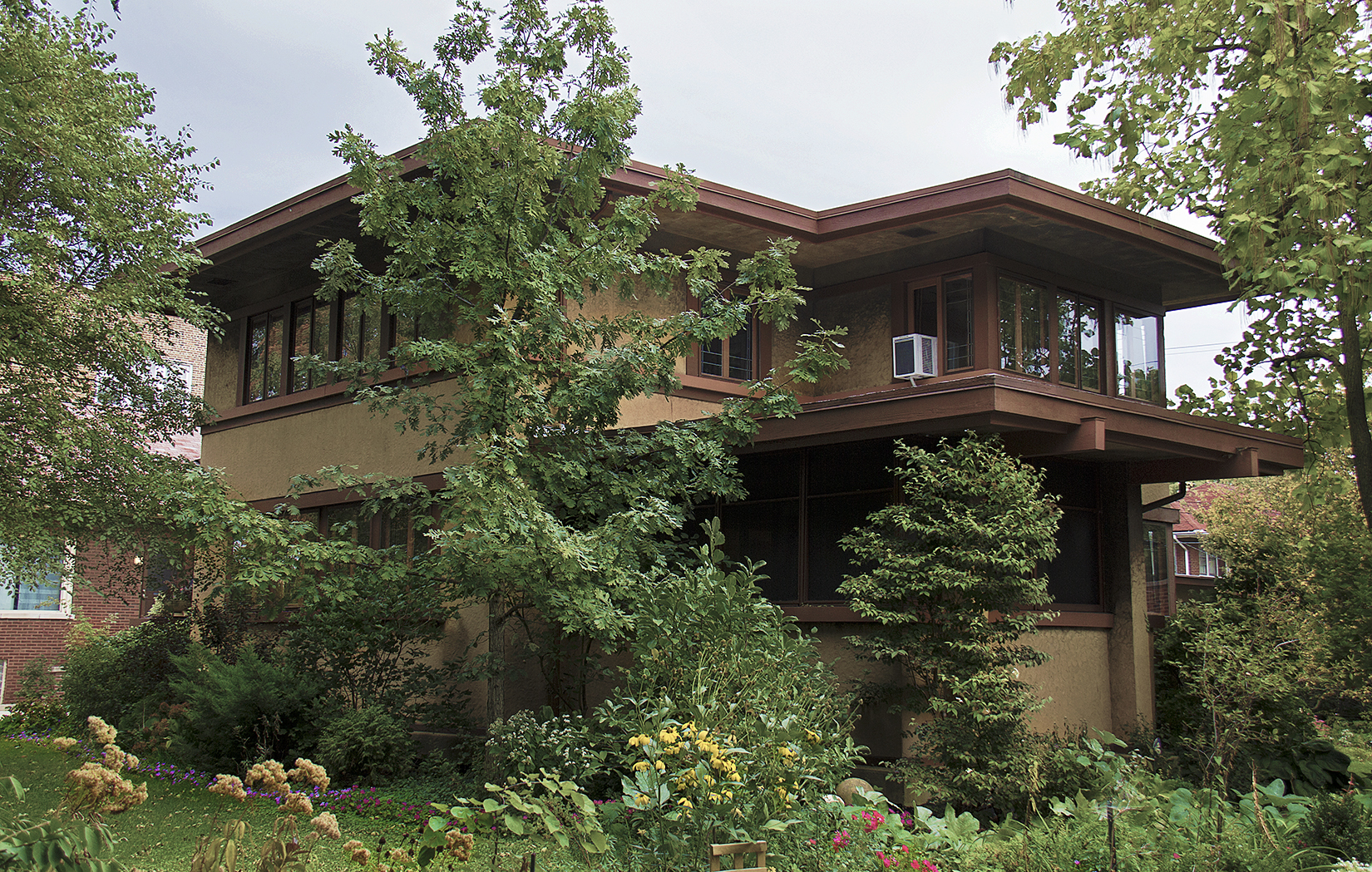

- Location within Chicago metropolitan area Location within Illinois Location within the United States
- Location: 7121 S. Paxton Ave., Chicago, Illinois
- Coordinates: 41°45′57″N 87°34′16″W
- Built: 1915
- Architect: John S. Van Bergen; N.A. Pellinger
- Architectural style: Prairie School
- NRHP reference No.: 91001082

Significant dates
- Added to NRHP: August 23, 1991
- Designated CHICL: December 1, 1993

The Allan Miller House is a prairie style house in the South Shore neighborhood of Chicago, United States. Located along Paxton Avenue, the home is the only surviving example of Frank Lloyd Wright colleague John S. Van Bergen's work found in Chicago. The house is cast in prairie style and was constructed in 1913. The building has been declared a Chicago Landmark and is listed on the U.S. National Register of Historic Places.

== History ==
The Allan Miller House, on Paxton Avenue was designed by John S. Van Bergen in 1913 for advertising executive Allan Miller.

== Architecture ==
The Miller House is considered an "excellent" example of prairie style architecture and it is Chicago's only surviving example of architect John S. Van Bergen. The home, like all prairie style homes, is meant to evoke the Midwestern prairie through its horizontal form and integration with the surrounding natural landscape.

== Significance ==
The Miller House was added to the U.S. National Register of Historic Places on August 23, 1991. The city of Chicago declared the building a Chicago Landmark on December 1, 1993.
