= Southport (Renton, Washington) =

Mixed-use development in Renton, Washington, United States

Coordinates: 47°30′10″N 122°12′13″W

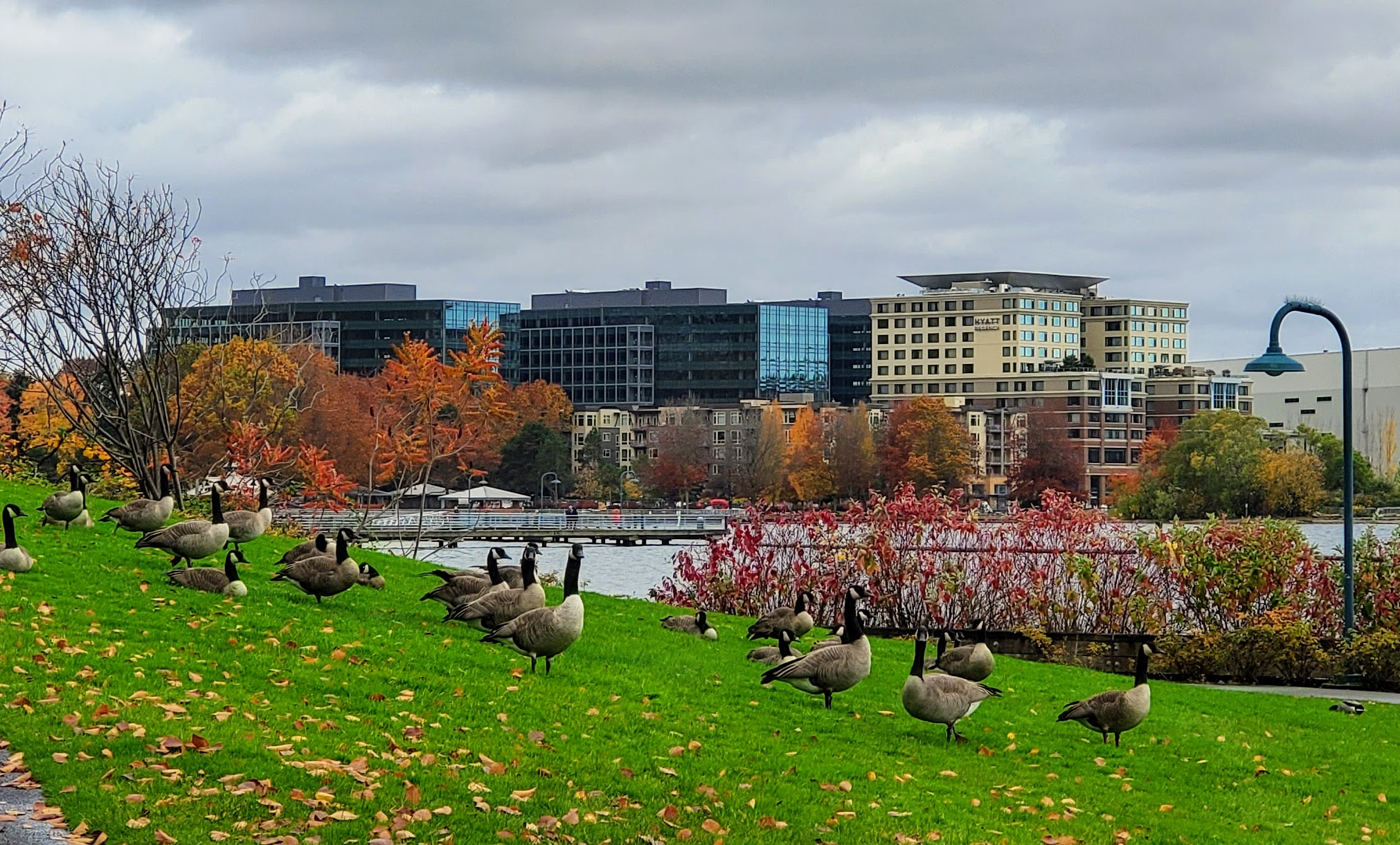
- The Southport development
- Interactive map of the Southport area

General information
- Location: Renton, Washington
- Construction started: 2001
- Completed: Residential phase (2002–08); Hotel and conference center (2017); Office buildings, first phase (2019)

Design and construction
- Architect: ZGF Architects
- Developer: Seco Development

Website
- southport.life

Southport is a mixed-use development in Renton, Washington, United States. It is located on the southern shore of Lake Washington adjacent to the Renton Landing lifestyle center and the Boeing Renton Factory.

== History ==
Southport is a 2,400,000-square-foot (220,000 m^{2}) mixed-use development that began in 1999, located on 32.2 acres (13.0 ha) along Lake Washington in Renton, Washington. The property was formerly the site of a Puget Sound Energy steam plant which was demolished in 2001, and construction on the residential phase of Southport began later that year.

By 2019, the complex included a hotel and 712,752 square feet of office space. across three office buildings. The complex also includes 30,000 square feet in retail space.

== Transportation ==
Seco plans to run ferry routes directly between Southport and other parts of the region, including South Lake Union in Seattle. The complex also includes a six-story parking garage and a private yacht dock.
