= Reed College =

Private liberal arts college in Portland, Oregon

- Type: Private liberal arts college
- Established: 1908; 118 years ago
- Affiliations: Annapolis Group; Oberlin Group; CLAC; NAICU
- Endowment: $876.8 million (2025)
- President: Audrey Bilger
- Faculty: 164
- Students: 1,278 (fall 2025)
- Undergraduates: 1,267 (fall 2025)
- Postgraduates: 11 (fall 2025)
- Location: Portland, Oregon, United States; 45.48°N 122.63°W
- Campus: Suburban, 116 acres (470,000 m²)
- Colors: Reed Red
- Mascot: Griffin
- Website: reed.edu

Reed College is a private liberal arts college in Portland, Oregon, United States. Founded in 1908, Reed is a residential college with a campus in the Eastmoreland neighborhood, Tudor-Gothic style architecture, and a forested canyon nature preserve at its center. Reed maintains a 9:1 student-to-faculty ratio and has approximately 1,300 undergraduate students.

Reed's curriculum includes programs in the humanities, social sciences, natural sciences, and arts. The college operates the Reed Research Reactor, a TRIGA research reactor used for undergraduate education and research, and in 2025 was classified as a Research College and University by the Carnegie Classification of Institutions of Higher Education.

Reed has developed a reputation for academic rigor and political progressivism, as well as for distinctive student traditions and an unconventional approach to undergraduate education.

== History ==
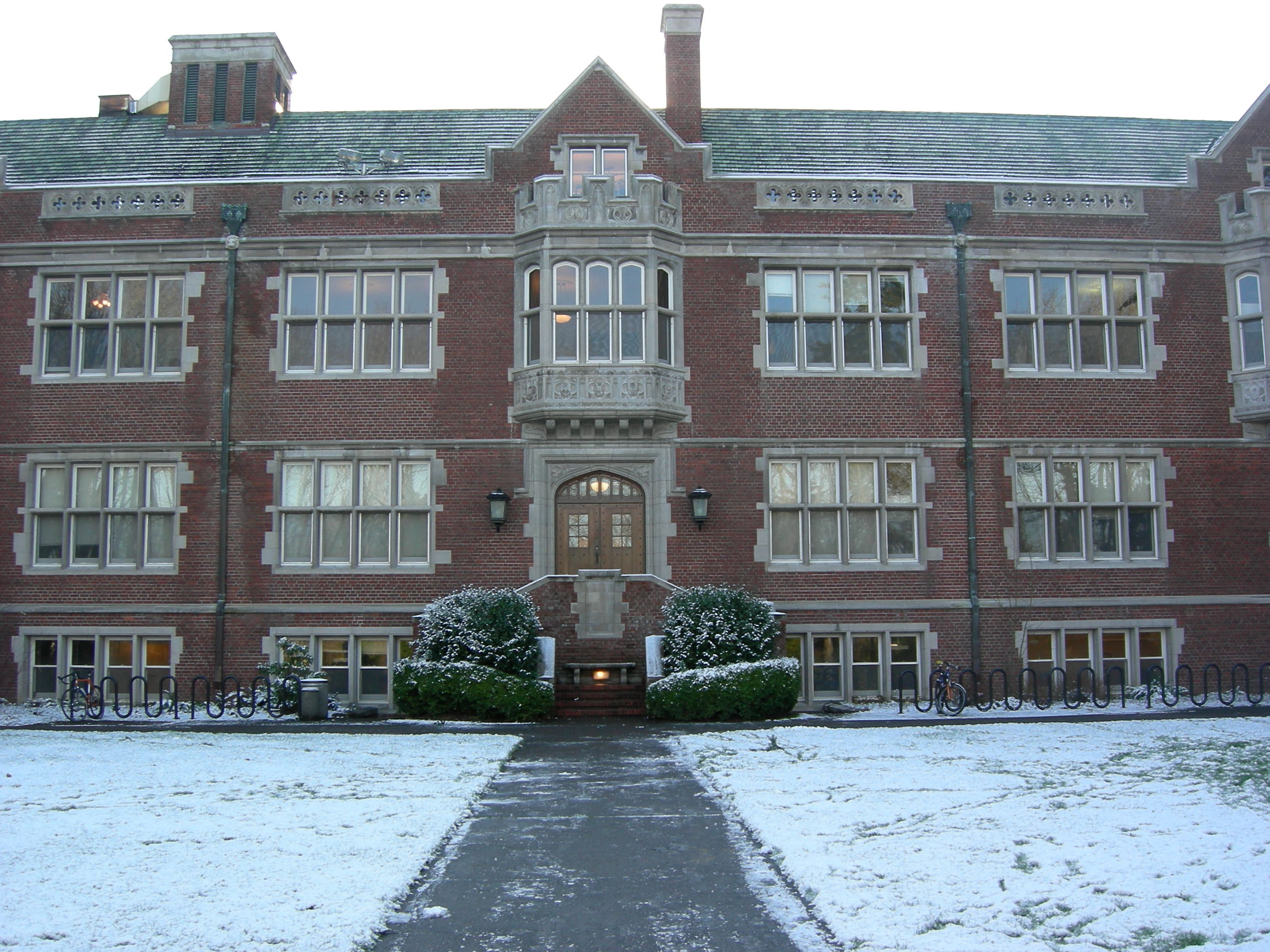
Reed College's Eliot Hall on a snowy day

The Reed Institute (the legal name of the college) was founded in 1908 and held its first classes in 1911. Reed is named for Oregon pioneers Simeon Gannett Reed (1830–1895) and Amanda Reed (died 1904). Simeon was an entrepreneur involved in several enterprises, including trade on the Willamette and Columbia Rivers with his close friend and associate, former Portland Mayor William S. Ladd. Unitarian minister Thomas Lamb Eliot, who knew the Reeds from the church choir, is credited with convincing Reed of the need for the school. Reed's will provided for the gift, and Ladd's son, William Mead Ladd, donated 40 acres from the Ladd Estate Company to build the new college. Reed's first president (1910–1919) was William Trufant Foster, a former professor at Bates College and Bowdoin College.

Reed was founded explicitly as a reaction against the "prevailing model of East Coast, Ivy League education", its lack of varsity athletics, fraternities, and exclusive social clubs – as well as its coeducational, nonsectarian, and egalitarian status – intended to foster an intensely academic and intellectual college.

During the 1930s, President Dexter Keezer was concerned about the fraternization among male and female students and the consumption of alcohol by students. A large portion of the Student Council took the position that Oregon's liquor laws did not apply to Reed's campus. Policies restricting the ability of students from visiting the dormitories of the opposite sex were fiercely resisted.

After World War II the college saw its enrollment numbers dramatically increase as veterans began enrolling in the college.

The college has developed a reputation for the political progressivism of its student body.

== Distinguishing features ==
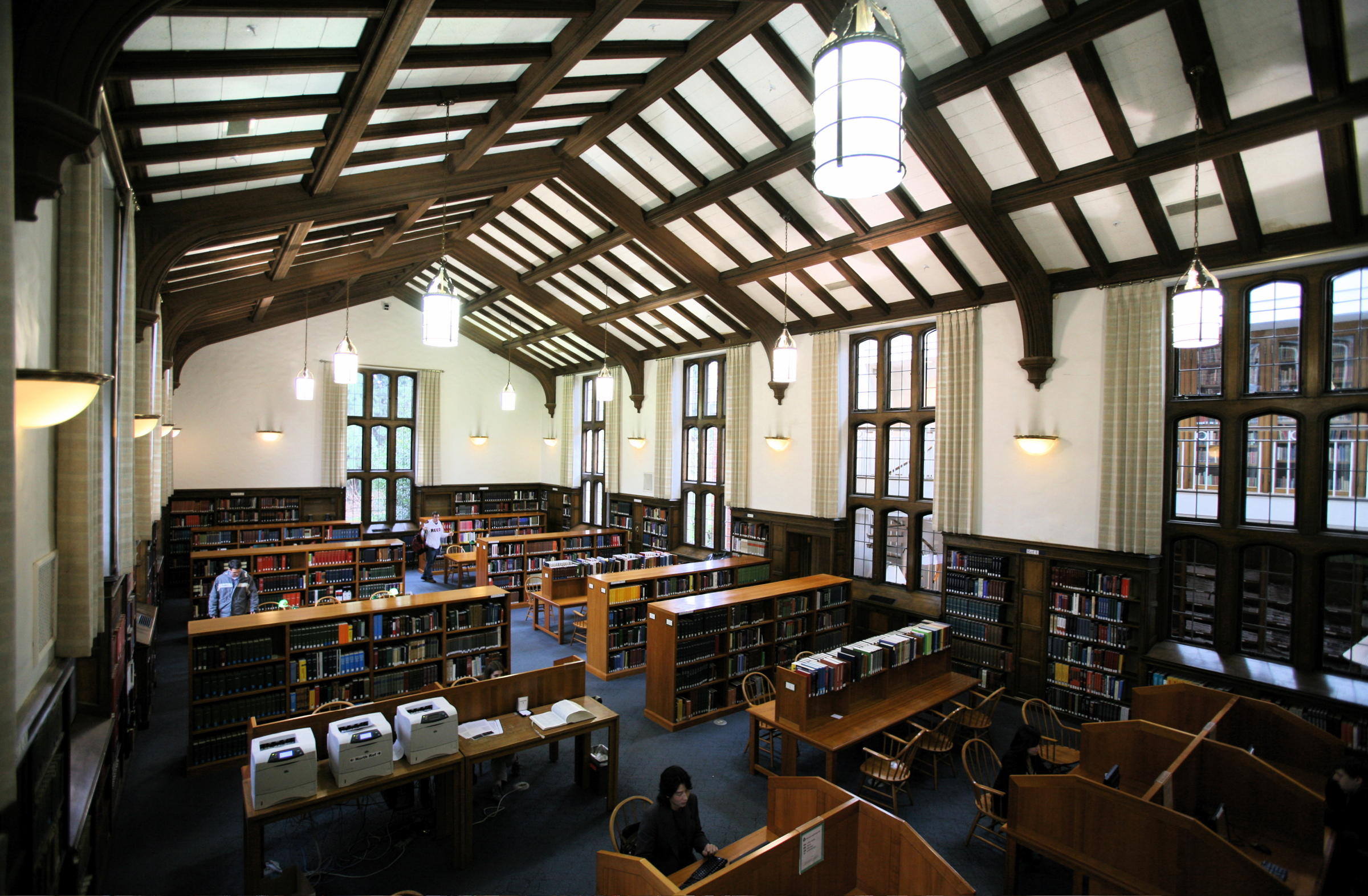
Part of the interior of the Eric V. Hauser Memorial Library

Reed's curriculum emphasizes interdisciplinary study, independent inquiry, and close interaction between students and faculty. Students are required to complete a senior thesis, a yearlong research project conducted under faculty supervision.

Reed places an emphasis on undergraduate research. Students may conduct research with faculty members, undertake independent projects, and receive funding for research conducted on campus and elsewhere. In 2025, the Carnegie Classification designated Reed as a Research College and University, a category for institutions with substantial research activity that do not fall into the Carnegie R1 or R2 research-university classifications. Carnegie reported $6.75 million in research spending at Reed.

Reed's student-to-faculty ratio is 9:1, and its average class size is 14.5 students. The college enrolled 1,267 undergraduates and 11 graduate students in fall 2025.

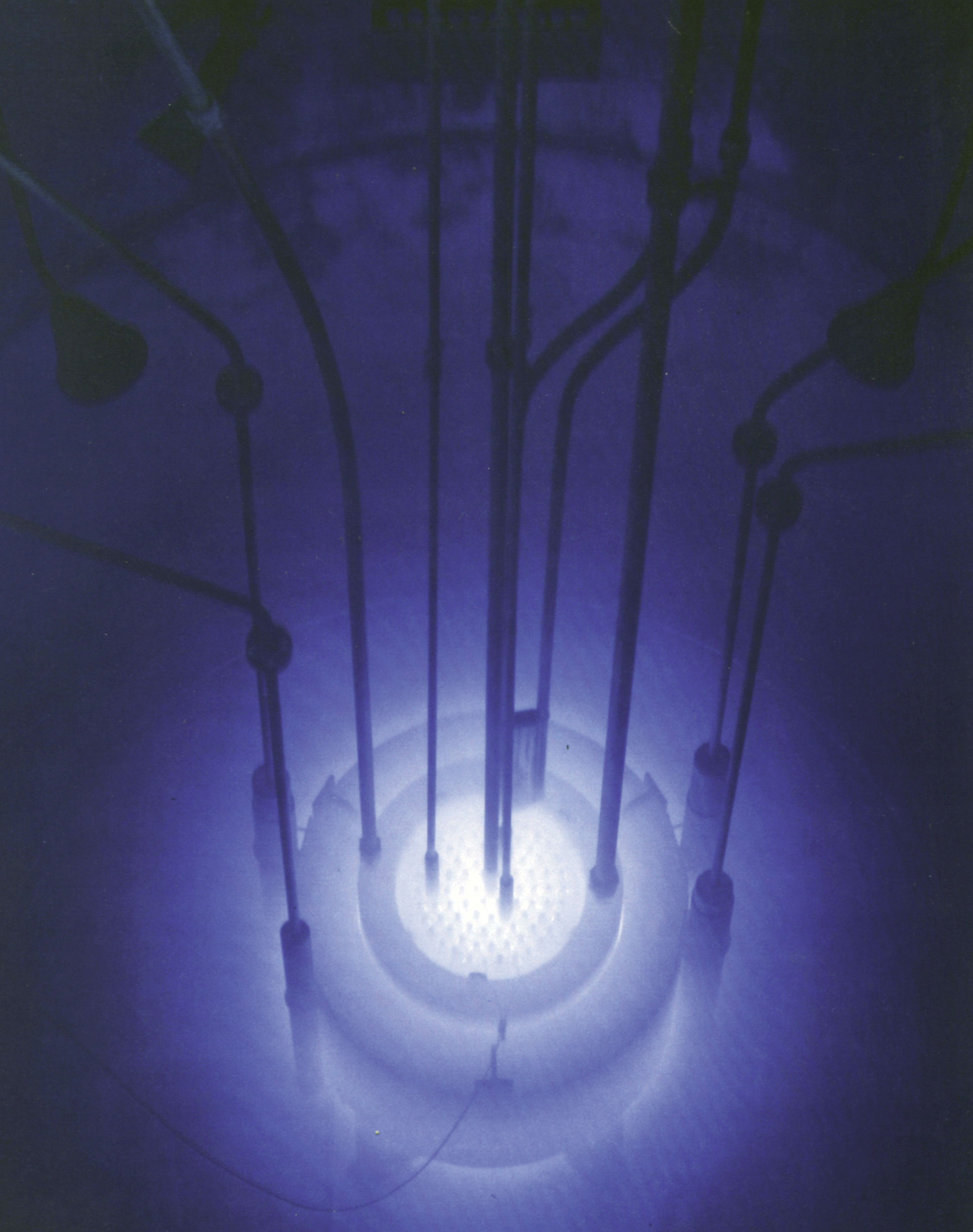
Cherenkov radiation at Reed's research reactor

Grades are de-emphasized at Reed and focus is placed on a narrative evaluation. Papers and exams are generally returned to students with lengthy comments but without grades affixed."There is no dean's list or honor roll, but students who maintain a GPA of 3.5 or above for an academic year receive academic commendations at the end of the spring semester which are noted on their transcripts. Reed is singled out as having little to no grade inflation over the years; only ten students graduated with a perfect 4.0 GPA in the period from 1983 to 2012. (Transcripts are accompanied by a card contextualizing Reed's grading approach so as not to penalize students' graduate school applications.) Although Reed does not award Latin honors to graduates, it confers several awards for academic achievement at commencement, including naming students to Phi Beta Kappa.

Reed has no fraternities or sororities and few NCAA sports teams although physical education classes (which range from kayaking to juggling to capoeira) are required for graduation. Reed also has several intercollegiate athletic clubs, notably the basketball, rugby, Ultimate Frisbee, and soccer teams.

== Academics ==
Reed categorizes its academic program into five Divisions and the Humanities program. Overall, Reed offers five Humanities courses, twenty-six department majors, twelve interdisciplinary majors, six dual-degree programs with other colleges and universities, and programs for pre-medical and pre-veterinary students. Its three most popular majors, based on 2023 graduates, were Psychology, Biology/Biological Sciences, and Computer and Information Sciences.

=== Divisions ===
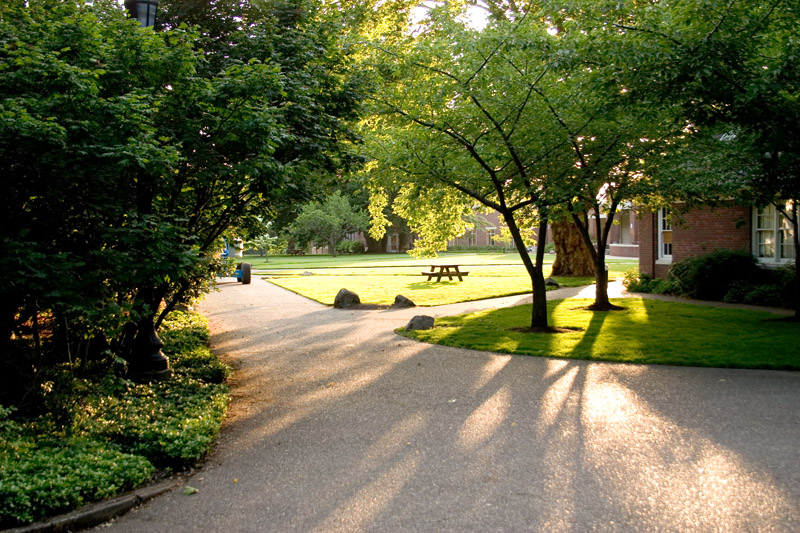
The Reed College campus

- Division of Arts: includes the Art (Art History and Studio Art), Dance, Music, and Theatre Departments;
- Division of History and Social Sciences: includes the Anthropology, Economics, History, Political Science, and Sociology Departments, as well as the International Affairs & Public Policy program;
- Division of Literature and Languages: includes the Chinese, English, French, German, Greek, Latin, and Ancient Mediterranean Studies (GLAM), Russian, and Spanish Departments, as well as the Creative Writing and Comparative Literature programs;
- Division of Mathematics and Natural Sciences: includes the Biology, Chemistry, Computer Science, Mathematics and Statistics, and Physics Departments, as well as the Biochemistry & Molecular Biology, Mathematics-Computer Science, and Neuroscience programs, and
- Division of Philosophy, Religion, Psychology, and Linguistics: includes the Linguistics, Philosophy, Psychology, and Religion Departments.

=== Humanities program ===
Reed President Richard Scholz in 1922 called the educational program as a whole "an honest effort to disregard old historic rivalries and hostilities between the sciences and the arts, between professional and cultural subjects, and, ... the formal chronological cleavage between the graduate and the undergraduate attitude of mind". The Humanities program, which came into being in 1943 (as the union of two year-long courses, one in "world" literature, the other in "world" history) is one manifestation of this effort. One change to the program was the addition of a course in Chinese Civilization in 1995. The faculty has also recently approved several significant changes to the introductory syllabus. These changes include expanding the parameters of the course to include more material regarding urban and cultural environments.

Reed's Humanities program includes the mandatory freshman course Introduction to Western Humanities covering ancient Greek and Roman literature, history, art, religion, and philosophy. Sophomores, juniors, and seniors may take Early Modern Europe covering Renaissance thought and literature; Modern Humanities covering the Enlightenment, the French Revolution, the Industrial Revolution, and Modernism, and/or Foundations of Chinese Civilization. There is also a Humanities Senior Symposium.

=== Dual-degree programs ===
Reed offers dual-degree programs in Computer Science (with University of Washington), Engineering (with Caltech, Columbia University, and Rensselaer Polytechnic Institute), Forestry or Environmental Management (with Duke University), and Fine Art (with the Pacific Northwest College of Art).

=== Rankings ===
Academic rankings

Liberal arts
- U.S. News & World Report: 63
- Washington Monthly: 78

National
- Forbes: 105
- WSJ/College Pulse: 75

In 1995, Reed College refused to participate in the U.S. News & World Report "best colleges" rankings, making it the first educational institution in the United States to refuse to participate in college rankings. According to Reed's Office of Admissions the school's refusal to participate is based in 1994 disclosures by The Wall Street Journal about institutions flagrantly manipulating data in order to move up in the rankings in U.S. News and other popular college guides. U.S. News maintains that their rankings are "a very legitimate tool for getting at a certain level of knowledge about colleges." In 2019, a team of statistics students recreated the formula used by U.S. News and were able to identify and quantify the penalty imposed on Reed. The students found the college to be ranked an estimated 52 places below an unbiased application of the U.S. News scoring rubric.

Money magazine ranked Reed 512th in the U.S. out of 623 schools evaluated for its 2022 "Best Colleges for Your Money" edition.

Reed is ranked as tied for the 63rd best liberal arts college by U.S. News & World Report in its 2025 rankings, and tied for 23rd in "Best Undergraduate Teaching", tied for 23rd in "Most Innovative Schools", and tied for 174th in "Top Performers on Social Mobility".

An episode of Canadian writer Malcolm Gladwell's podcast Revisionist History examines the flaws in the U.S. News system of university rankings. The episode features a project done by a Reed professor of statistics and her students to investigate the mechanics of the ranking algorithm, attempting to see if Reed's ranking had been purposefully devalued because the school refused to submit its information to U.S. News. Previous investigations by Reed students to re-create U.S. News's statistical ranking algorithm found that Reed's correct 2019 rank was #38 instead of its assigned rank of #90.

== Admissions ==
=== Undergraduate ===
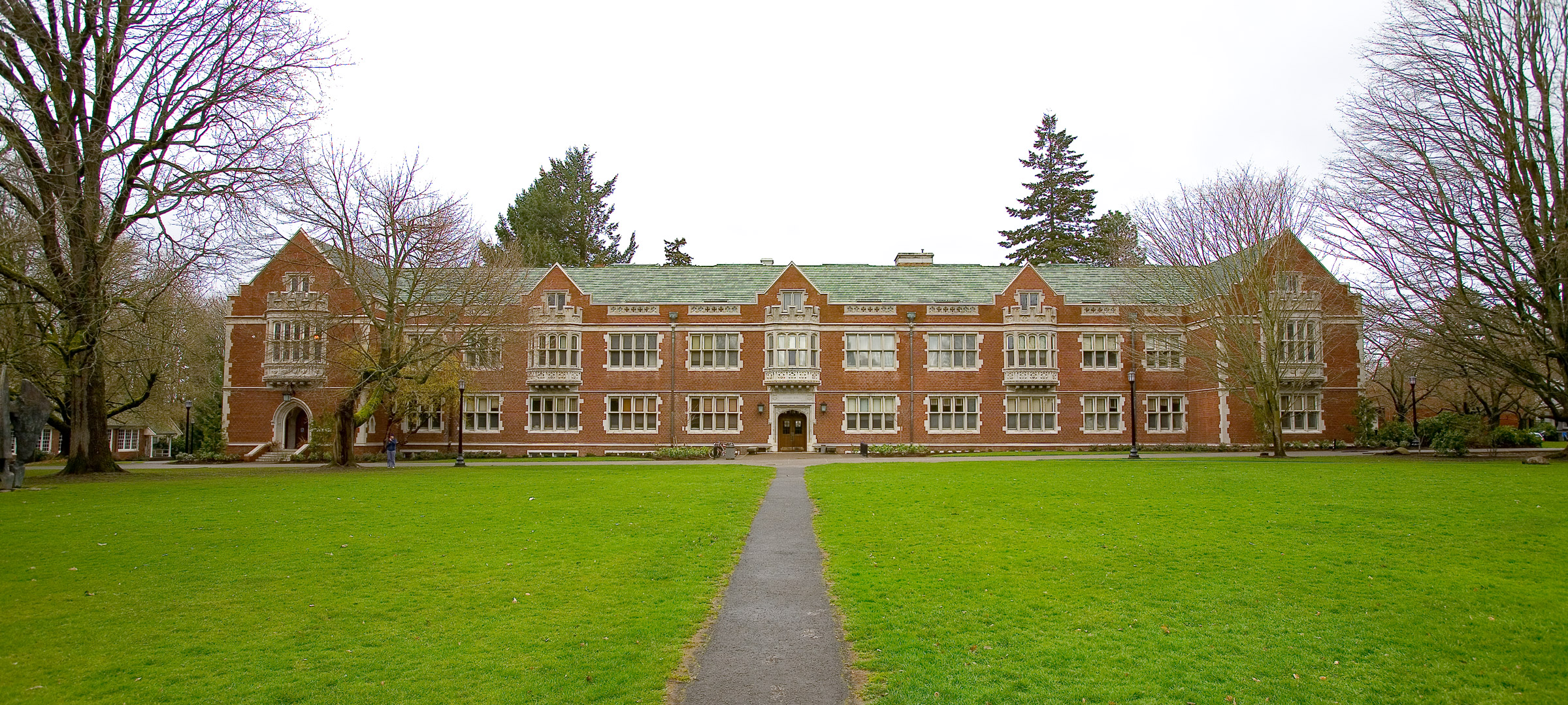
Eliot Hall in 2007

The entering class in 2024 was drawn from 9,023 applicants, with 2321 accepted, and 303 students admitted. Median SAT scores were 690 math and 730 reading. Since 2018, to increase student enrollment from historically underrepresented minorities, Reed encourages application to the college's "Discover Reed Fly-In Program", an all-inclusive, all-expenses-paid, multi-day campus tour and open to all high school seniors who are US citizens or permanent residents, regardless of race or ethnicity.

=== Tuition and finances ===
The total direct cost for the 2022–23 academic year, including tuition, fees and room-and-board, was $80,710. Indirect costs (books, supplies, transportation, personal expenses) could be another $3,950. For the 2022–23 academic year, the average financial aid package was $52,284. In 2022–23 over half of students received financial aid from the college. In 2004, 1.4% of Reed graduates defaulted on their student loans – below the national Cohort Default Rate average of 5.1%.

Reed's endowment as of June 30, 2023, was $764 million. In the economic downturn that began in late 2007, Reed's total endowment had declined from $455 million in June 2007 to $311 million in June 2009. By the end of 2013, however, the endowment surpassed the $500 million mark.

=== Academic honors ===
Reed College administrators claim that the college has the second-highest number of Rhodes scholars among its alumni for any liberal arts college—32—as well as over one hundred Fulbright Scholars, over seventy Watson Fellows, and three MacArthur ("Genius") Award winners. A very high proportion of Reed graduates go on to earn PhDs, particularly in the natural sciences, history, political science, and philosophy. Reed is ranked third in the percentage of graduates who go on to earn PhDs in all disciplines, after only Caltech and Harvey Mudd. In 1961, Scientific American declared that second only to Caltech, "This small college in Oregon has been far and away more productive of future scientists than any other institution in the U.S." Reed is ranked first in producing PhDs in biology, second in chemistry and humanities, third in history, foreign languages, and political science, fourth in science and mathematics, fifth in physics and social sciences, sixth in anthropology, seventh in area and ethnic studies and linguistics, and eighth in English literature and medicine.

Loren Pope, former education editor for The New York Times, wrote about Reed in his 1996 book Colleges That Change Lives, saying, "If you're a genuine intellectual, love the life of the mind, and want to learn for the sake of learning, the place most likely to empower you is not Harvard, Yale, Princeton, Chicago, or Stanford. It is the most intellectual college in the country — Reed in Portland, Oregon."

== Historical reputation for drug use ==
Reed developed a reputation for permissive attitudes toward student drug and alcohol use beginning in the 1960s. The reputation became the subject of national and local media coverage and was reinforced by several serious drug-related incidents in the 2000s and early 2010s.

In February 2012, the Reed administration chose to call the police following the discovery of "two to three pounds of marijuana and a small amount of ecstasy and LSD in the on-campus apartment of two juniors". Following campus debate, Reed's president at the time, Colin Diver, issued a letter to students and staff, saying the college would not tolerate illegal drug use on campus: "Such behavior endangers the health and welfare of the entire community, attracts potentially dangerous criminal activity on campus, undermines the academic mission of the college, and violates the college's obligations under state and federal law."

Reed's current policy prohibits the possession, use, sale, transfer, and manufacture of illicit drugs on campus and establishes procedures for responding to violations. The college also provides education, counseling, and other resources related to alcohol and other drug use.

== Political and social activism ==
Reed has a reputation for being politically left-of-center.

During the McCarthy era of the 1950s, then-president Duncan Ballantine fired Marxist philosopher Stanley Moore, a tenured professor, for his failure to cooperate with the House Un-American Activities Committee (HUAC) investigation. According to an article in the college's alumni magazine, "because of the decisive support expressed by Reed's faculty, students, and alumni for the three besieged teachers and for the principle of academic freedom, Reed College's experience with McCarthyism stands apart from that of most other American colleges and universities. Elsewhere in the academic world both tenured and nontenured professors with alleged or admitted communist party ties were fired with relatively little fuss or protest. At Reed, however, opposition to the political interrogations of the teachers was so strong that some believed the campus was in danger of closure." A statement of "regret" by the Reed administration and board of trustees was published in 1981, formally revising the judgment of the 1954 trustees. In 1993, then-President Steve Koblik invited Moore to visit the college, and in 1995 the last surviving member of the Board that fired Moore expressed his regret and apologized to him.

=== Reedies Against Racism ===
On September 26, 2016, students organized a boycott of all college operations in participation with the National Day of Boycott, a national day of protest which was proposed by actor Isaiah Washington on Twitter in response to the issue of police brutality against African-Americans. Following the boycott, students created an activist group called Reedies Against Racism (RAR) and presented a list of demands for the college they described as being on behalf of students from marginalized backgrounds. The primary demand concerned Reed's mandatory freshman humanities course, proposing that the course either be changed to be more inclusive of world literature and classics or to be made not mandatory. One element of the class deemed racist by the protestors was the use of the 1978 Steve Martin song "King Tut" in a discussion about cultural appropriation. Students began a protest campaign against the curriculum by sitting in during lectures with signs with quotations from various African-American and non-white academics. Other protests separate from the humanities course also included efforts to shout down speakers, including Kimberly Peirce after she was accused of profiting from transphobia while making the film Boys Don't Cry. The group eventually focused on Reed's banking relationship with Wells Fargo, based on allegations that the bank had invested in the Dakota Access Pipeline project and the private prison industry, and staged an occupation of Reed's Eliot Hall.

There was some opposition to the lecture protests, notably by Reed professor of English Lucía Martínez Valdivia, who stated that a protest during her lecture on Sappho would amplify her pre-existing case of PTSD. In November 2017, Chris Bodenner of The Atlantic wrote about growing student resentment toward the tactics of RAR. In response to protests the faculty decided to undergo the decennial review process a year early, as well as to complete the process in three months instead of the usual year. In January 2018, Humanities 110 chair professor Libby Drumm announced in a campus-wide email that the course curriculum would be restructured after years of faculty discussion and in response to student feedback as well as input from an external review committee composed of humanities faculty from other institutes, adopting a "four-module structure" that would include texts from the Americas and allow greater flexibility in the curriculum which would be integrated beginning fall 2018. The external review had not in fact been completed nor reviewed at the time of the announcement.

Following "a contentious year of protests, including an anti-racism sit-in in Kroger's office", college president John Kroger resigned, effective June 2018.

== Campus ==
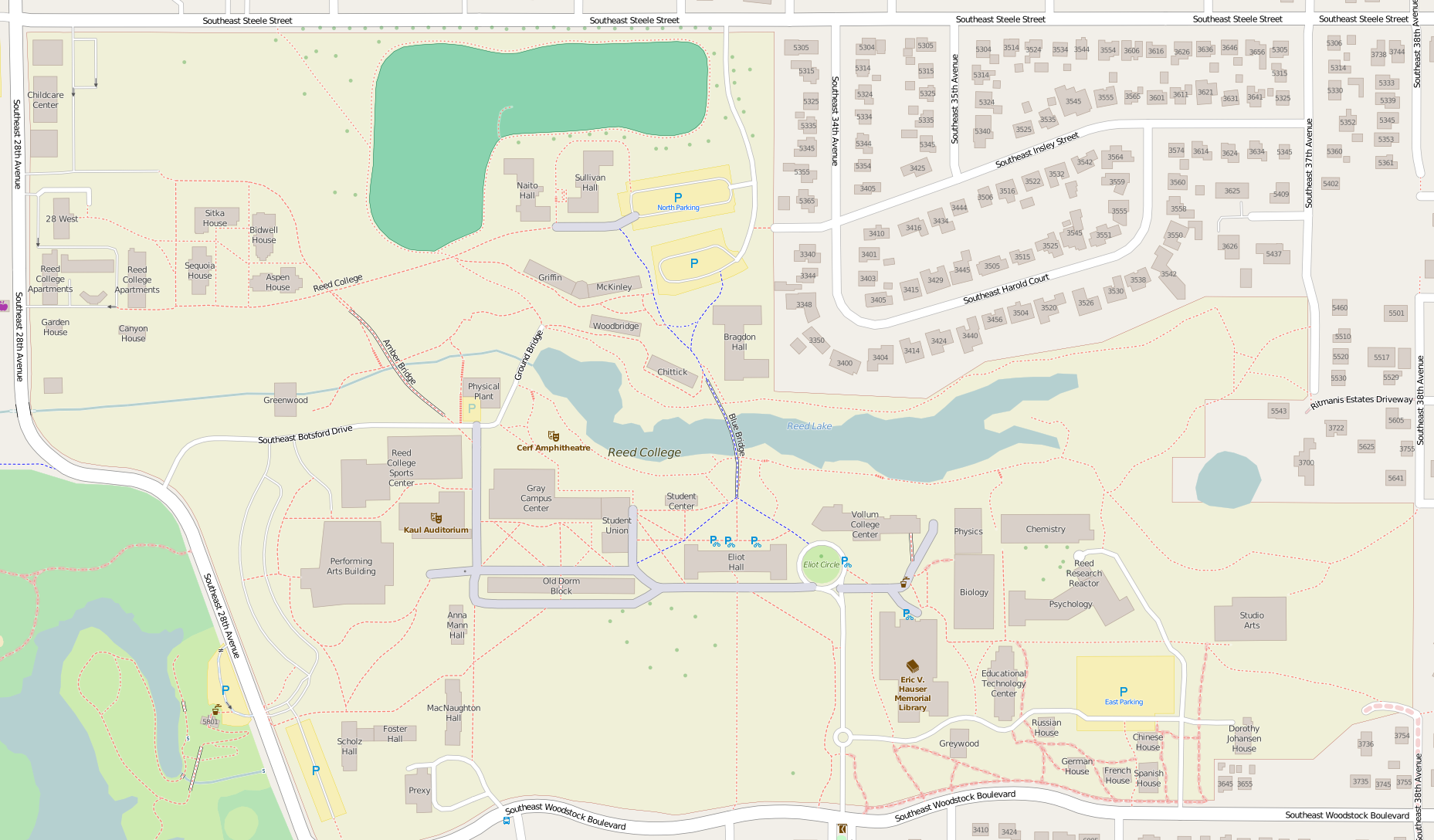
Map of the Reed College campus

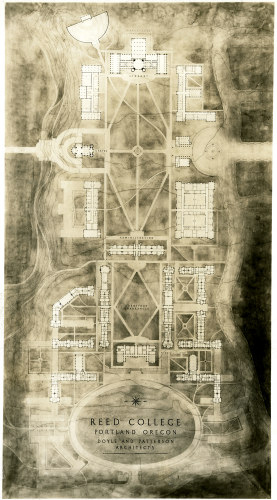
A. E. Doyle's 1920 Master Plan

The Reed College campus was established on a tract of land in southeast Portland known in 1910 as Crystal Springs Farm, a part of the Ladd Estate, formed in the 1870s from original land claims. The college's grounds include 116 acres (0.47 km^{2}) of contiguous land, including a wooded wetland known as Reed Canyon.

Portland architect A. E. Doyle developed a plan, never implemented in full, modeled on the University of Oxford's St. John's College. The original campus buildings (including the Library, the Old Dorm Block, and what is now the primary administration building, Eliot Hall) are brick Tudor Gothic buildings in a style similar to Ivy League campuses. In contrast, the science section of campus, including the physics, biology, and psychology (originally chemistry) buildings, were designed in the Modernist style. The Psychology Building, completed in 1949, was designed by Modernist architect Pietro Belluschi at the same time as his celebrated Equitable Building in downtown Portland.

The campus and buildings have undergone several phases of growth and there are now 21 academic and administrative buildings and 18 residence halls. Since 2004, Reed's campus has expanded to include adjacent properties beyond its historic boundaries, such as the Birchwood Apartments complex and former medical administrative offices on either side of SE 28th Avenue, and the Parker House, across SE Woodstock from Prexy. At the same time the Willard House (donated to Reed in 1964), across from the college's main entrance at SE Woodstock and SE Reed College Place, was converted from faculty housing to administrative use. Reed announced on July 13, 2007, that it had purchased the Rivelli farm, a 1.5-acre (0.61 ha) tract of land south of the Garden House and west of Botsford Drive. Reed's "immediate plans for the acquired property include housing a small number of students in the former Rivelli home during the 2007–08 academic year. Longer term, the college anticipates that it may seek to develop the northern portion of the property for additional student housing".

=== Residence halls ===
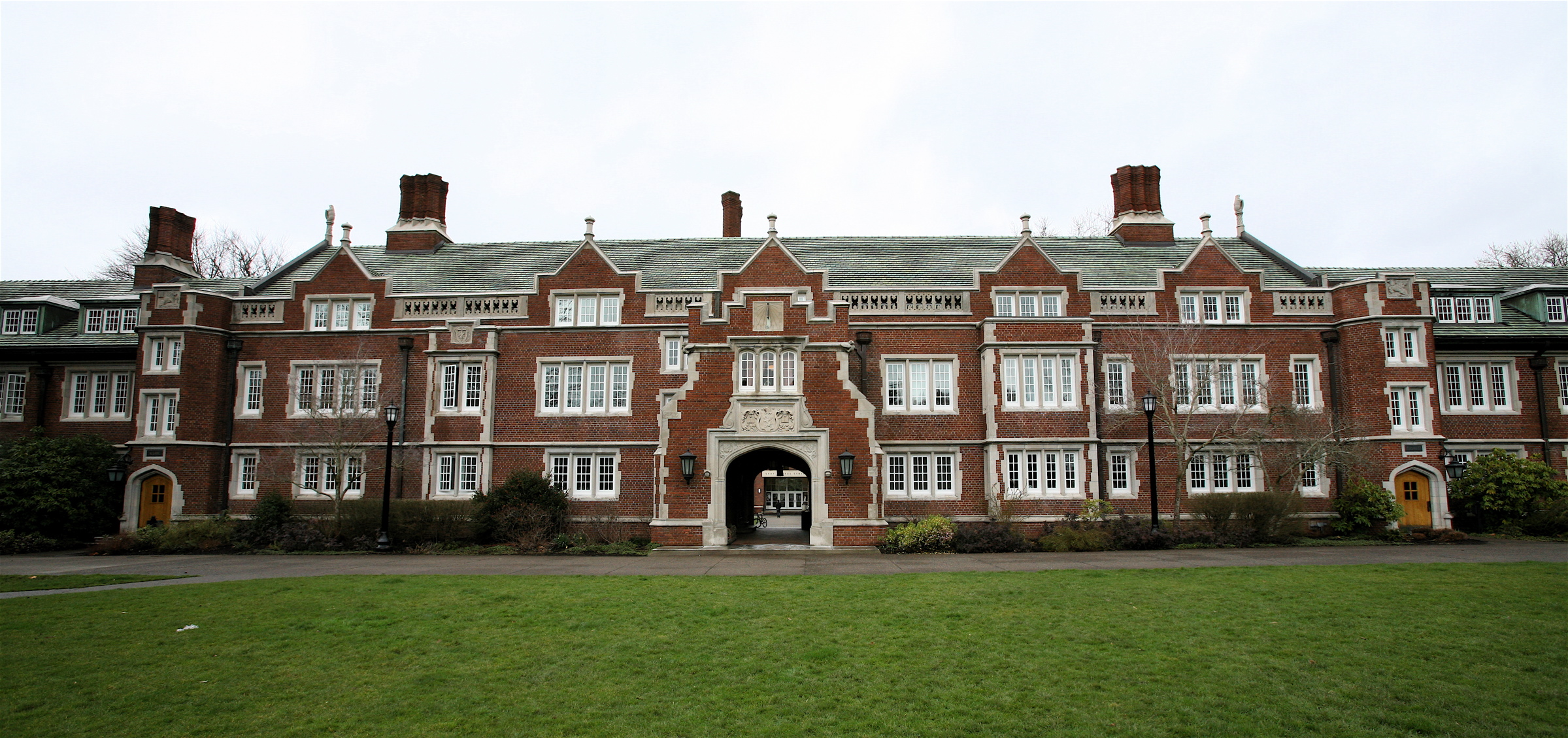
The Old Dorm Block

Reed houses 945 students in 18 residence halls on campus and several college-owned houses and apartment buildings on or adjacent to campus. Residence halls on campus range from the traditional (i.e., Gothic Old Dorm Block, referred to as "ODB") to the eclectic (e.g., Anna Mann, a Tudor-style cottage built in the 1920s by Reed's founding architect A. E. Doyle, originally used as a women's hall), language houses (Spanish, Russian, French, German, and Chinese), "temporary" housing, built in the 1960s (Cross Canyon – Chittick, Woodbridge, McKinley, Griffin), to more recently built dorms (Bragdon, Naito, Sullivan). Reed also offers three interest-based housing options as of 2026: The Sustainability and Environmental Justice Collective in Garden House, the Students of Color Community, and the Queer Collective. Before the COVID-19 pandemic, the school offered a wider range of interest-based housing including everything from substance-free living to Japanese culture to music to a dorm for students interested in outdoors activities (hiking, climbing, bicycling, kayaking, skiing, etc.). The college's least-loved complex (as measured by applications to the college's housing lottery), MacNaughton and Foster-Scholz, is known on campus as "Asylum Block" because of its post-World War II modernist architecture and interior spaces dominated by long, straight corridors lined with identical doors, said by students to resemble that of an insane asylum. Until 2006, it was thought that these residence halls had been designed by architect Pietro Belluschi.

Under the 10-year campus master plan adopted in 2006, Foster-Scholz is scheduled to be demolished and replaced and MacNaughton to be remodeled. According to the master plan, "The College's goal is to provide housing on or adjacent to the campus that accommodates 75% of the [full-time] student population. At present, the College provides on-campus housing for 838 students."

In Spring 2007, the college broke ground on the construction of a new quadrangle called the Grove, with four new Leed certified residence halls (Aspen, Sequoia, Sitka, Bidwell). They opened on the northwest side of campus in Fall 2008. A new Spanish House residence was completed. Together, the five new residences added 142 new beds.

Reed also has off-campus housing. Many houses in the Woodstock and Eastmoreland Portland neighborhoods are traditionally rented to Reed students.

On February 21, 2018, Reed announced the construction of the "largest residence hall in its history". Completed in Fall 2019, Trillium houses an additional 180 students, boosting Reed's housing capacity to nearly 80% of the student body, up from 68%. The addition of Trillium guarantees housing for both freshman and sophomores, as students were formerly subjected to a housing lottery after freshman year. The new building is also designed to meet "LEED Platinum standards", and Reed is currently evaluating proposals to put solar panels on the roof.

=== Reed Canyon ===
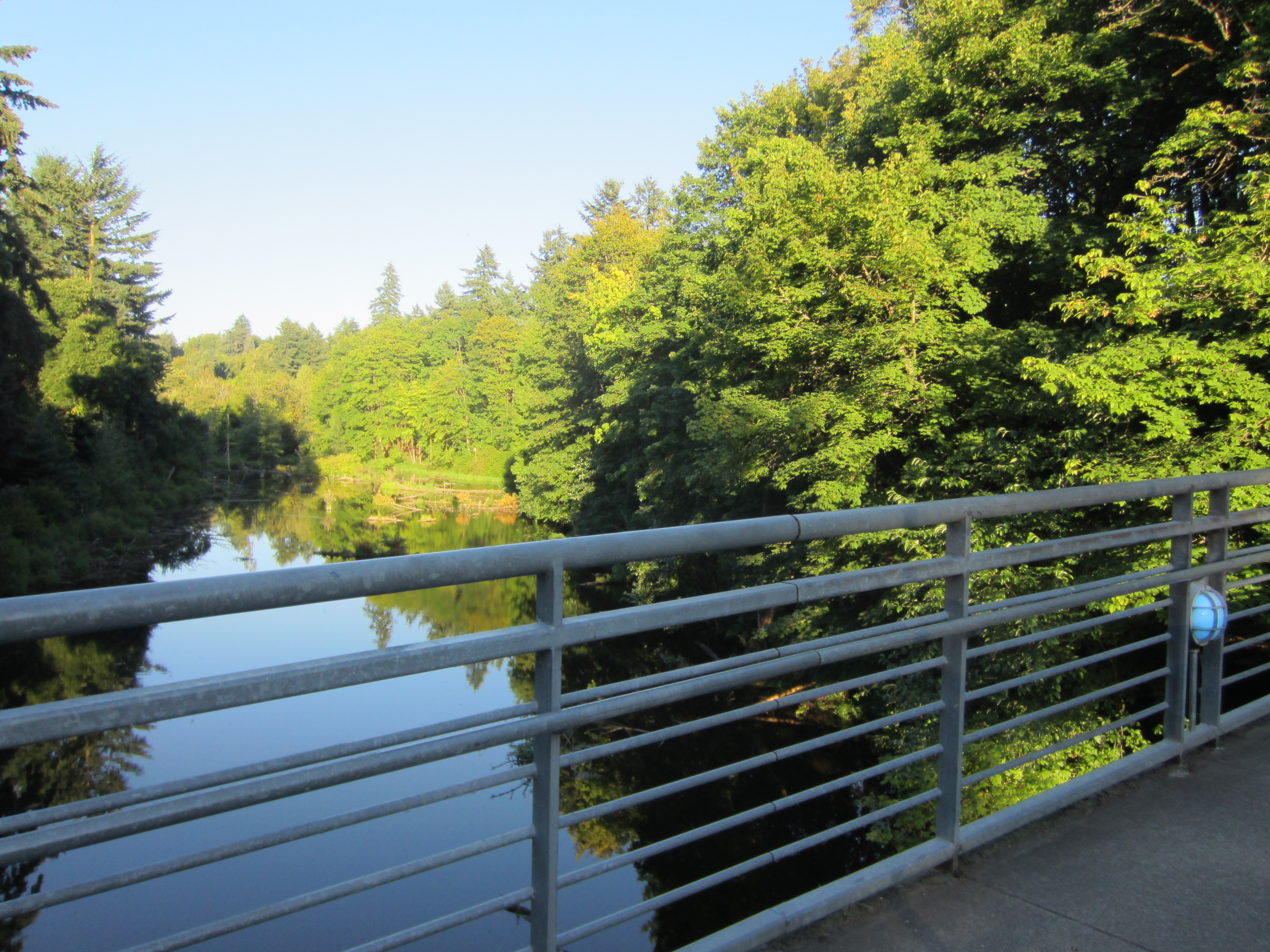
The eastern half of the Canyon, visible from Blue Bridge

The Reed College Canyon, a natural area and national wildlife preserve, bisects the campus, separating the academic buildings from many of the residence halls (the so-called cross-canyon halls). The canyon is filled by Crystal Creek Springs, a natural spring that drains into Johnson Creek.

Canyon Day, a tradition dating back to 1915, is held twice a year. On Canyon Day students and Reed neighbors join canyon crew workers to spend a day helping with restoration efforts.

A landmark of the campus, the Blue Bridge, spans the canyon. This bridge replaced the unique cantilevered bridge that served in that spot between 1959 and 1991, which "featured stressed plywood girders – the first time this construction had been used on a span of this size: a straight bridge 132 feet (40 m) long and 15 feet (4.6 m) high. It attracted great architectural interest during its lifetime."

A new pedestrian and bicycle bridge spanning the canyon was opened in fall 2008. This bridge, dubbed the "Bouncy Bridge", "Orange Bridge", and in some cases the "Amber Bridge" by students, is 370 feet (110 m) long, about a third longer than the Blue Bridge, and "connect[s] the new north campus quad to Gray Campus Center, the student union, the library, and academic buildings on the south side of campus."

=== Douglas F. Cooley Gallery ===
Reed's Cooley Gallery is an internationally recognized contemporary art space located at the entrance to the Eric V. Hauser Memorial Library. It was established in 1988 as the result of a gift from Susan and Edward Cooley in honor of their late son. The Cooley Gallery has exhibited international artists such as Mona Hatoum, Al Held, David Reed and Gregory Crewdson as well as the contemporary art collection of Michael Ovitz. In pursuit of its mission to support the curriculum of the art, art history, and humanities programs at Reed, the gallery produces two exhibitions each year to coincide with the academic calendar, along with lectures, colloquia, and artist visits. The gallery is currently under the directorship of Derek Franklin. Previous directors include Stephanie Snyder, and founding director Susan Fillin-Yeh.

=== Food services ===
The cafeteria, known simply as "Commons", has a reputation for ecologically sustainable food services. The commons dining hall is operated by Bon Appétit and food is purchased on an item-by-item basis. Suiting the student body, vegan and vegetarian dishes feature heavily on the menu. It is currently the only cafeteria on the small campus, with the exception of Canyon Cafe (formerly Caffe Circo and Caffe Paradiso), a small cafe on the other side of campus which also operated by board points. Scrounging is a long tradition at Reed College allowing students to offer unfinished Commons' food to students without board points from their trays as they are returned to be washed.

The Reed College Co-ops are a theme community that reside in the Farm and Garden Houses, after many years on the first floor of MacNaughton Hall. These are the only campus dorms that are independent of the school's board plan. They traditionally throw an alternative "Thanksgiving" celebration that has sometimes included a square-dance. The Co-ops house students who purchase and prepare food together, sharing chores and conducting weekly, consensus-based meetings. It is a close community valuing sustainability, organic food, consensus-based decisions, self-government, music, and plants.

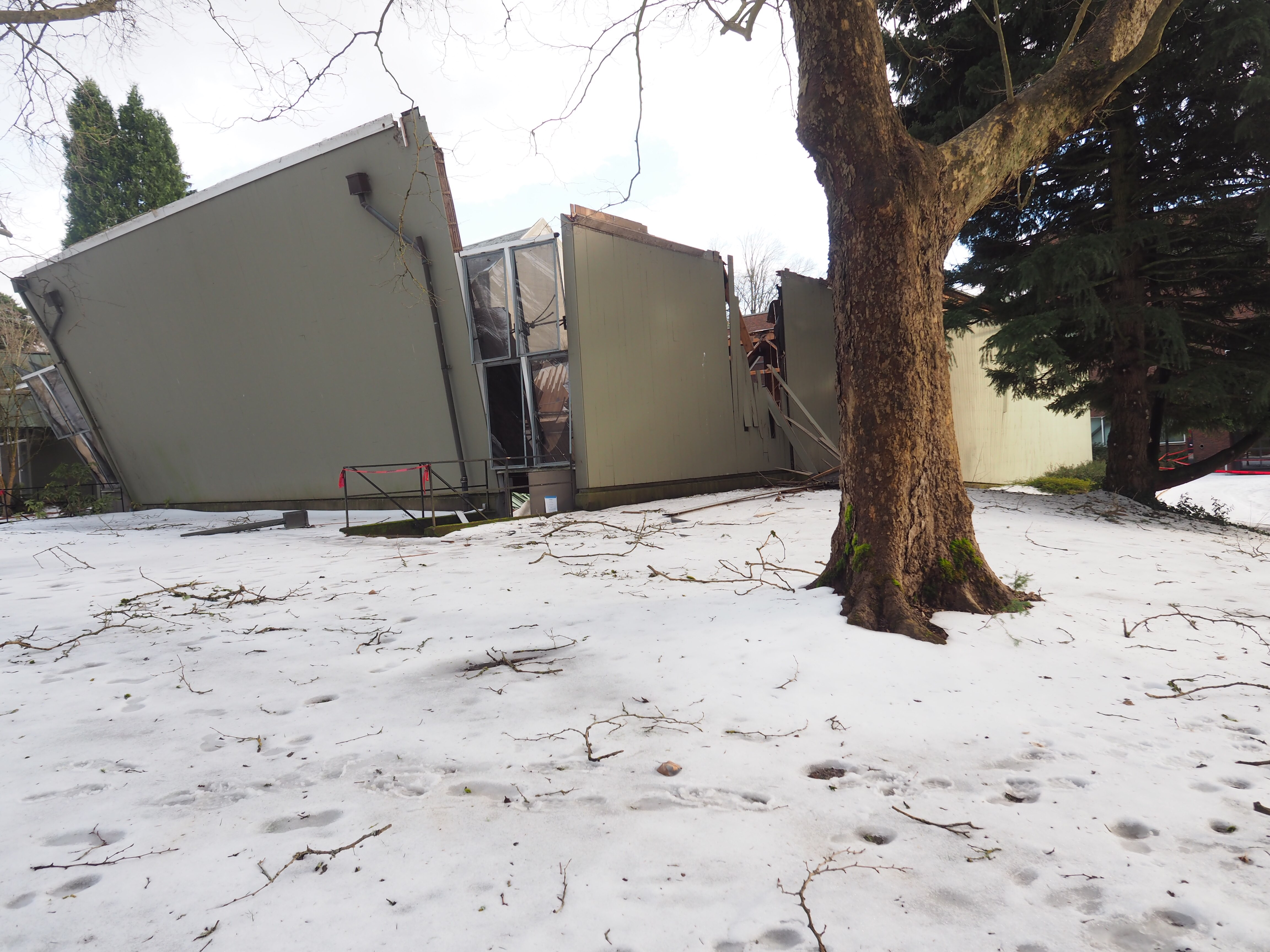
The Aubrey R. Watzek Sports Center the day following its collapse.

The Paradox ("Est. in the 80s") is a student-run coffee shop located on campus. In 2003 the Paradox opened a second coffee shop, dubbing it the "Paradox Lost" (an allusion to John Milton's Paradise Lost) at the southern end of the biology building, in the space commonly called the "Bio Fishbowl". The new north-campus dorms, which opened in fall 2008, feature yet another small cafe, originally dubbed "Cafe Paradiso", thereby providing three coffee shops within a 116-acre (0.47 km^{2}) campus. The recent addition of a circus-themed mural to the cafe prompted a name change, and it now operates as Caffe Circo. This third shop is not student-run but is operated by Bon Appétit. Bon Appétit has a monopoly on the food services at Reed as they are the only ones who accept board points; written into their contract is the prohibition of food carts on campus.

=== 2021 collapse of the Aubrey R. Watzek Sports Center ===
On February 15, 2021, the Aubrey R. Watzek Sports Center collapsed during Winter Storm Uri. Both gyms that were part of the sports center collapsed. The collapse was attributed to excess snow piling up on the roof of the building causing a support truss to fracture and strain several others, causing the roof to collapse. The sports center was serving as a COVID-19 testing center, and the destruction of the testing center resulted in the loss of testing kits and other medical supplies needed for COVID-19 testing.

== Icons and student life ==
Demographics of student body (Fall 2025)
African American	5.0%
Asian American	16.0%
Hawaiian/Pacific Islander	<1.0%
Hispanic American	10.0%
Native American	2.0%
International	11.0%
White American	54.0%
Unknown	1.0%
Female	44.0%
Male	34.0%
Nonbinary	22.0%

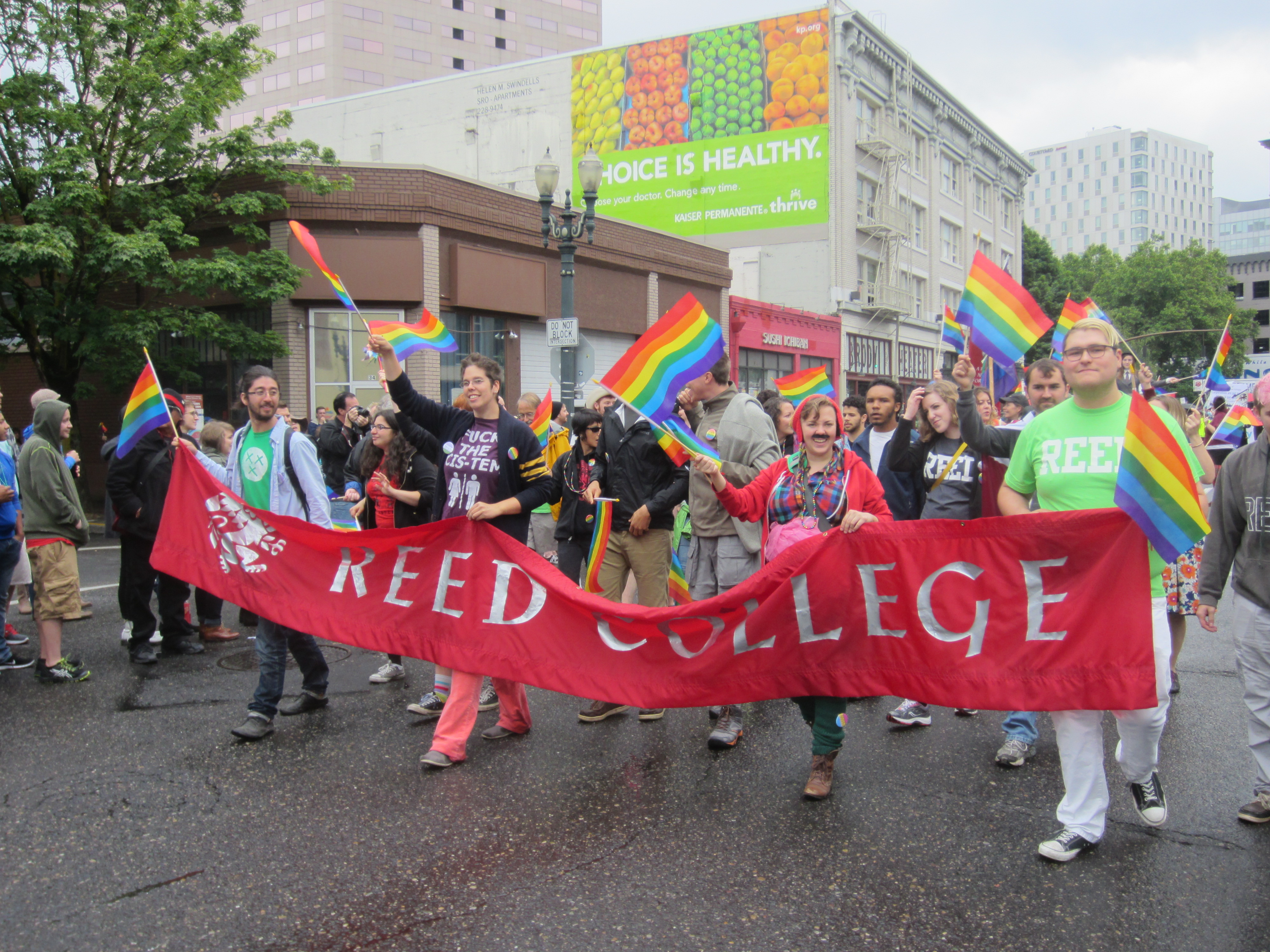
Reed College students, faculty, and staff marching in Portland Pride 2014

=== Griffin ===
The official mascot of Reed is the griffin. In mythology, the griffin often pulled the chariot of the sun; in canto 32 of Dante's Commedia the griffin is associated with the Tree of Knowledge. The griffin was featured on the coat-of-arms of founder Simeon Reed and is now on the official seal of Reed College. Though the school does not have varsity sports, the mascot features prominently throughout campus iconography outside of an athletic context.

=== School color ===
The official school color of Reed is Richmond Rose. Over the years, institutional memory of this fact has faded and the color appearing on the school's publications and merchandise has darkened to a shade of maroon. The most common examples of "Richmond Rose" are the satin tapes securing the degree certificate inside a Reed College diploma.

=== School song ===
The school song, "Fair Reed", is sung to the tune of the 1912 popular song "Believe Me, if All Those Endearing Young Charms". It may be imitative of the Harvard anthem "Fair Harvard", which is also sung to the same tune. It was composed by former president William Trufant Foster shortly after Reed's founding and is rarely heard today.

An unofficial alma mater, "Epistemology Forever", sung to the tune of "The Battle Hymn of the Republic", has been sung by Reed students since the 1950s.

=== Students' nicknames ===
Reed students and alumni referred to themselves as "Reedites" in the early years of the college. This term faded out in favor of the now ubiquitous "Reedie" after World War II. Around campus, prospective students are called "prospies."

=== Unofficial mottos and folklore ===
An unofficial motto of Reed is "Communism, Atheism, Free Love", and can be found in the Reed College Bookstore on sweaters, T-shirts, etc. It was a label that the Reed community claimed from critics during the 1920s as a "tongue-in-cheek slogan" in reference to Reed's nonconformism. Reed's founding president William T. Foster's outspoken opposition against the entrance of the United States into World War I, as well as the college's support for feminism, its adherence to academic freedom (i.e., inviting a leader of the Socialist Party of America to speak on campus about the Russian Revolution’s potential effect on militarism, emancipation of women, and ending the persecution of Jews), and its nonsectarian status made the college a natural target for what was originally meant to be a pejorative slur.

Faux Reed Seal

The faux Reed Seal has changed over the years. In its original form the griffin was holding a hammer and sickle in its paws. Later versions had the griffin wearing boxing gloves.

One of the unofficial symbols of Reed is the Doyle Owl, a roughly 280-pound (130 kg) concrete statue that has been continuously stolen and re-stolen since about 1919. The original Doyle Owl (originally "House F Owl" after the dormitory named House F that later became Doyle dormitory) was a garden sculpture from the neighborhood stolen by House F residents as a prank (there is a photo of House F residents around the original owl that has been made into a T-shirt). The on-campus folklore of events surrounding the Doyle Owl is sufficiently large that, in 1983, a senior thesis was written on the topic of the Owl's oral history. The original Doyle Owl was destroyed many years ago; the current avatar is Doyle Owl number 13, plus or minus 11. At the present time only one Owl is being shown.

=== Paideia ===
Each January, before the beginning of second-semester classes, the campus holds an interim period called Paideia (drawn from the Greek, meaning 'education'). Originally conceived and approved by the faculty in 1968 for unstructured independent study, or "UIS", Paideia ran for the full month of January from 1969 to 1981, supervised by a committee of faculty, staff and students. This festival of learning takes the form of classes and seminars put on by anyone who wishes to teach, including students, professors, staff members, and outside educators invited on-campus by members of the Reed Community. The classes are intended to be informal, yet intellectual activities free of the usual academic pressure endemic to Reed. Many such classes are explicitly trivial (one long-running tradition is to hold an underwater basket weaving class), while others are trivially academic (such as "Giant Concrete Gnome Construction", a class that, incidental to building monolithic gnomes, includes some content relating to the construction of pre-Christian monoliths). More structured classes (such as martial arts seminars and mini-classes on obscure academic topics), tournaments, and film festivals round out the schedule, which is different every year. The objective of Paideia is not only to learn new (possibly non-useful) things, but to turn the tables on students and encourage them to teach.

In his 2005 Stanford commencement lecture, Apple Inc. founder and Reed dropout Steve Jobs credited a Reed calligraphy class taught by Robert Palladino for his focus on choosing quality typefaces for the Macintosh. While the full calligraphy course is no longer taught at Reed, Paideia usually features a short course on the subject in addition to the informal, weekly gatherings (currently held on Thursday evenings and Friday afternoons) of aspiring calligraphy enthusiasts.

=== Renn Fayre ===
Renn Fayre is an annual three-day celebration with a different theme each year. Born in the 1960s as an actual renaissance fair, it has long since lost all connection to anachronism and the Renaissance, although its name has persisted. The event is initiated by a procession of seniors throwing their thesis notes in a large bonfire after the completed theses are submitted.

=== Reed Arts Week ===
Reed Arts Week is a celebration of the arts at Reed College. It includes music, dance, theater, films, creative writing and the visual arts. In addition to student performances, major artists perform original works and participate in master class work with members of the Reed College community.

=== Student organizations ===
According to Reed's website, each semester, a $155 student body fee "is collected from each full-time student by the business office", acting as agent for the student senate. This fee is set to increase incrementally every year. The fee underwrites publication of the student newspaper and extracurricular activities, and partially supports the student union and ski cabin." Student body funds (totaling roughly $370,000 annually) are distributed each semester to groups that place among the top 40 organizations in the semester's funding poll. The funding poll uses a voting system in which each organization provides a description that is ranked by each member of the student body with either 'top six,' 'approve,' 'no opinion,' 'disapprove.' A former 'deep six' was eliminated from the system in 2019. These ranks are then tabulated by assigning numbers to each rank and summing across all voters. Afterwards, the top forty organizations present their budgets to the student body senate during Funding Circus. The following day the senate makes decisions about each budget in a process called Funding Hell.

The school's student-run newspaper, The Reed College Quest or simply the Quest, has been published since 1913, and its radio station KRRC had been broadcasting, with a few interruptions, from 1955. The station now broadcasts online only at krrc.fm.

Although some student organizations partnered with outside groups such as Oxfam or Planned Parenthood are more structured, most student organizations are highly informal. There is no formal process for forming a student organization at Reed; a group of students (or a single student) announcing themselves as or just considering themselves a student organization is enough, but groups that desire funding from the school's Student Activities office or Student Body Fees must register with Student Activities or through the Student Senate. The Reed archive of comic books and graphic novels, the MLLL (Comic Book Reading Room), is well into its fourth decade, and Beer Nation, the student group that organizes and manages various beer gardens throughout the year and during Renn Fayre, has existed for many years. Some organizations, such as the Motorized Couch Collective—dedicated to installing motors and wheels into furniture—have become more Reed myth than reality in recent years.

Reed has ample recreational facilities on campus, a ski cabin on Mount Hood, recreational clubs such as the Reed Outing Club (ROC), and Club Sports (with college-paid coaches), including ultimate frisbee, co-ed soccer, rugby, basketball, and squash.

=== Campus Safety and Sexual Assault ===
According to a 2014 Washington Post analysis of federal campus safety data, Reed College had 12.9 reports of rape per 1,000 students, the "highest total of reports of rape" per 1,000 students of any college in the nation on its main campus. It is unclear whether Reed's high reporting rate arises from the college and student body fostering an environment that is more supportive of reporting sexual assault or due to a higher offending pattern by students. However, a 2011 investigation by the Center for Public Integrity found those found responsible in cases of sexual assault at Reed often faced few consequences, while victims experienced significant negative impacts.

Reed publishes annual campus security and fire safety reports as required under federal law. The 2024 report, covering calendar year 2023, recorded five reported sex offenses, compared with 11 reported sex offenses in 2022.

The college's current Community Safety department operates continuously and receives reports of sexual assault, provides safety services, and refers reports to internal and external resources.

== Notable people ==
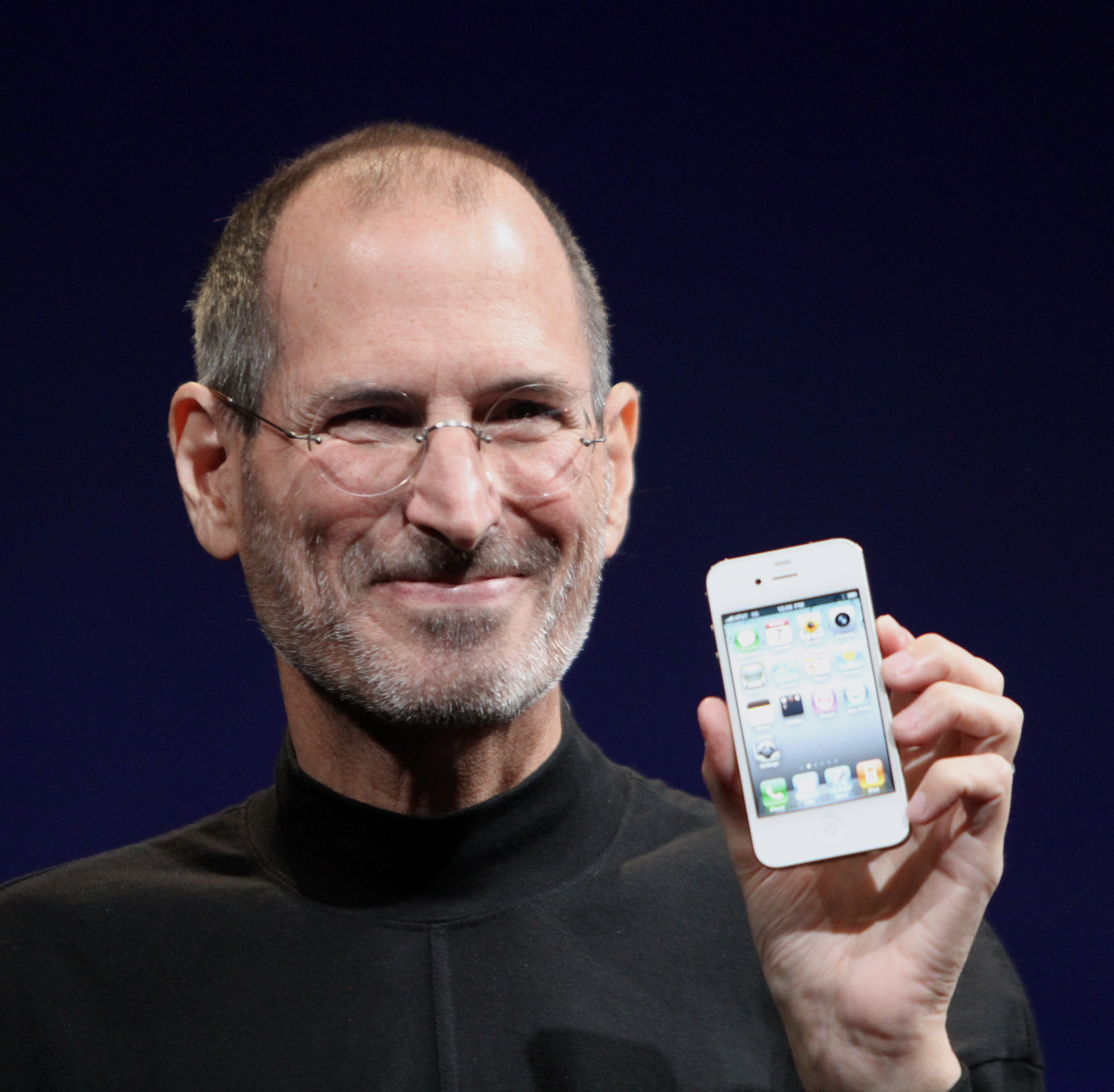
Steve Jobs, founder of Apple Inc.

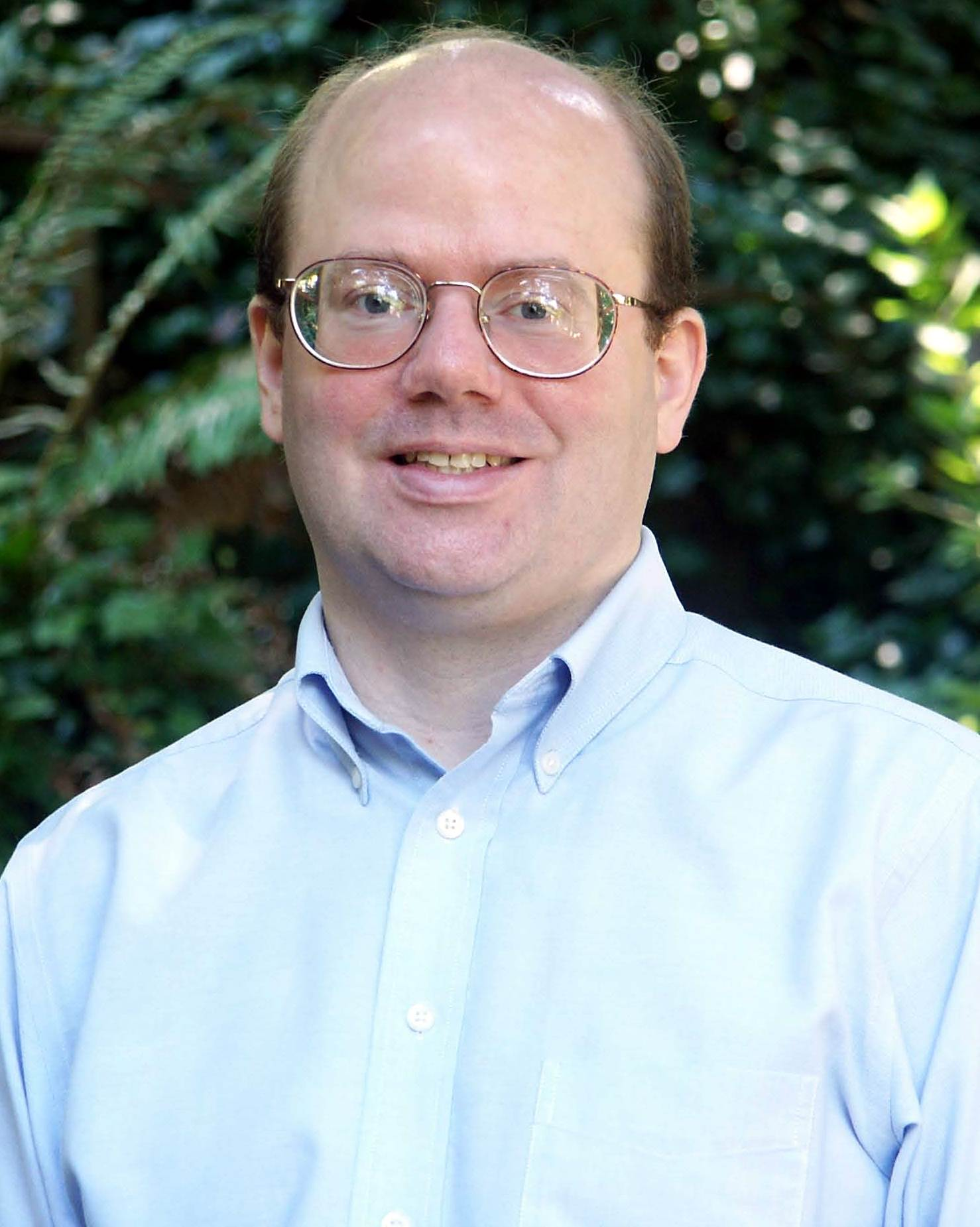
Larry Sanger, co-founder of Wikipedia

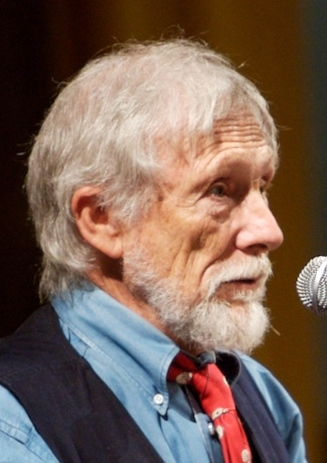
Gary Snyder, poet

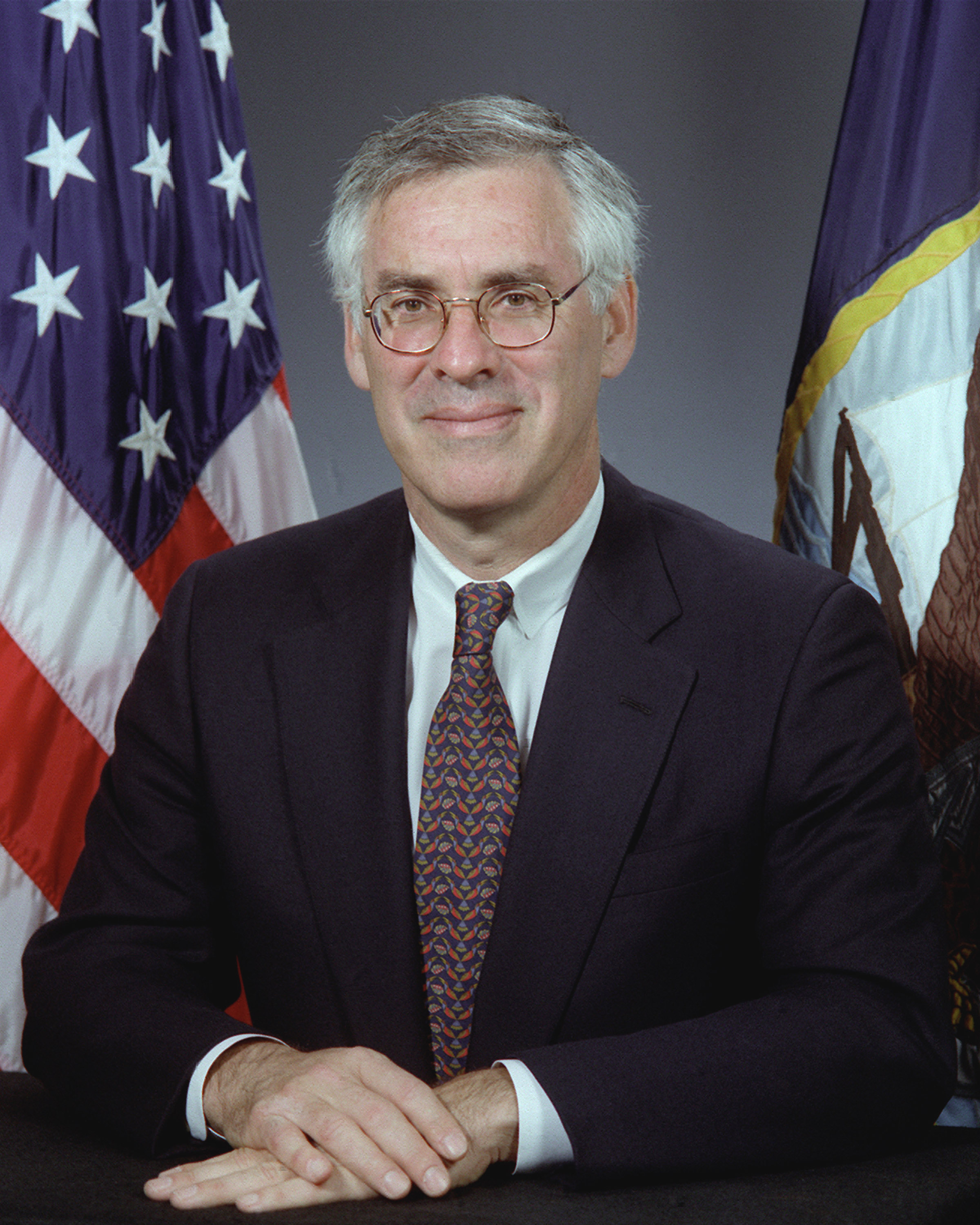
Richard Danzig, 71st U.S. Secretary of the Navy

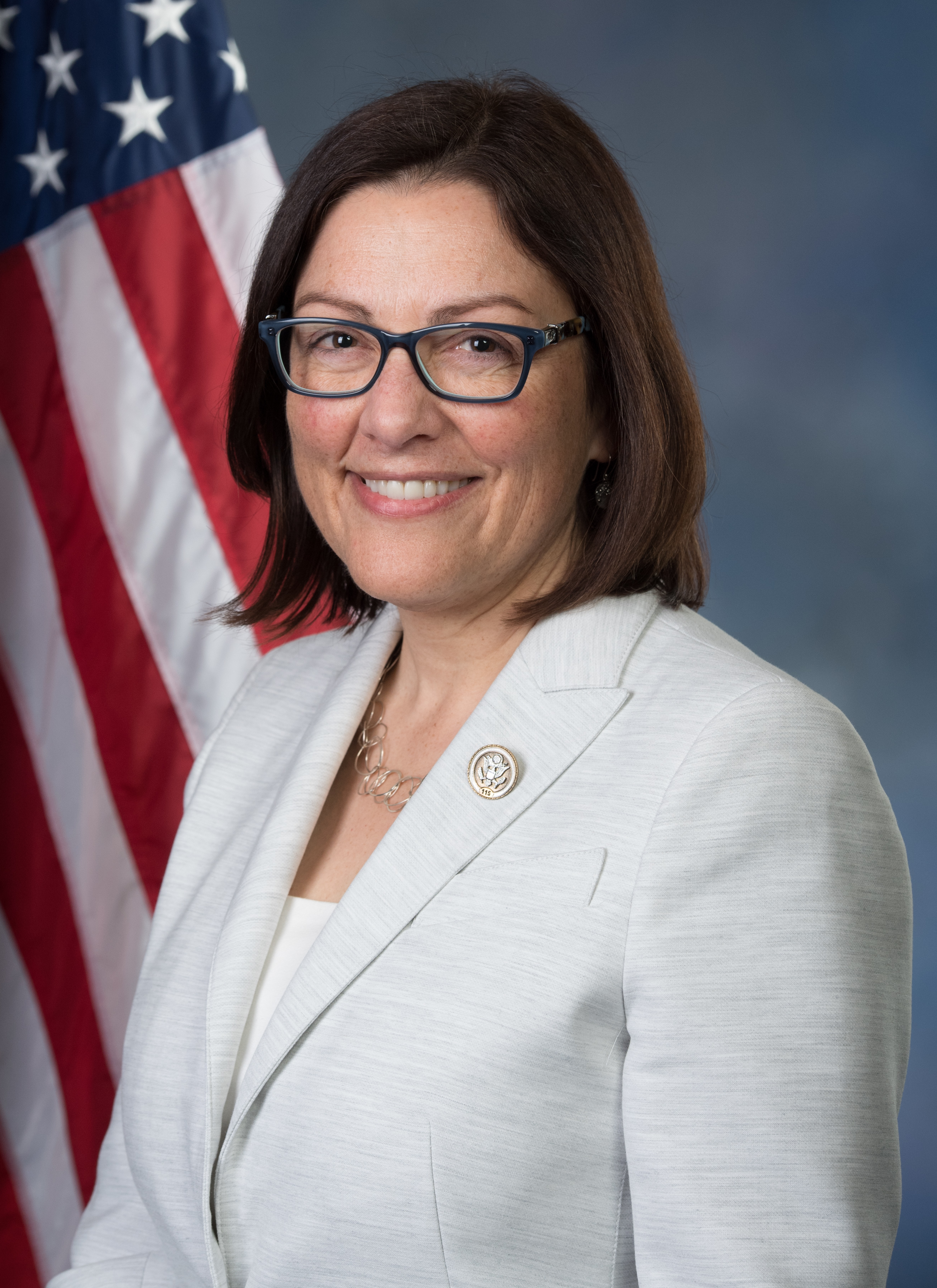
Suzan DelBene, U.S. Representative from Washington

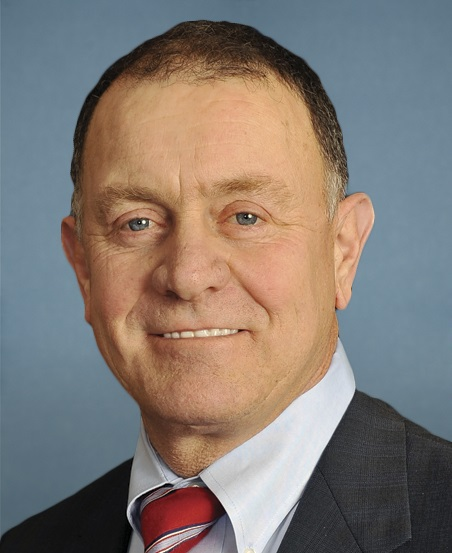
Richard L. Hanna, U.S. Representative from New York

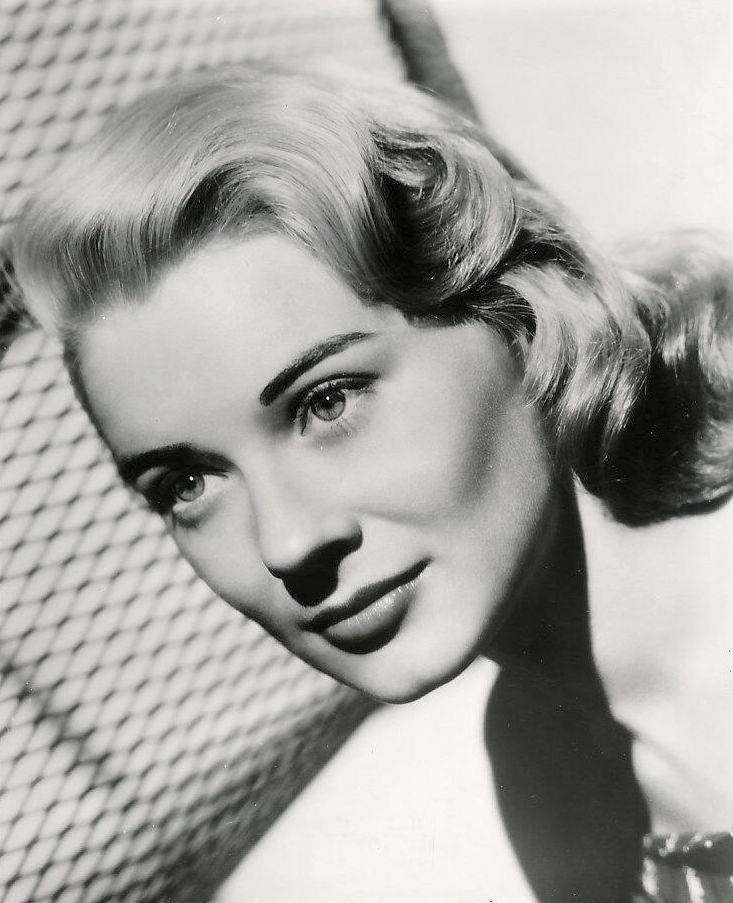
Hope Lange, Academy Award-nominated actress

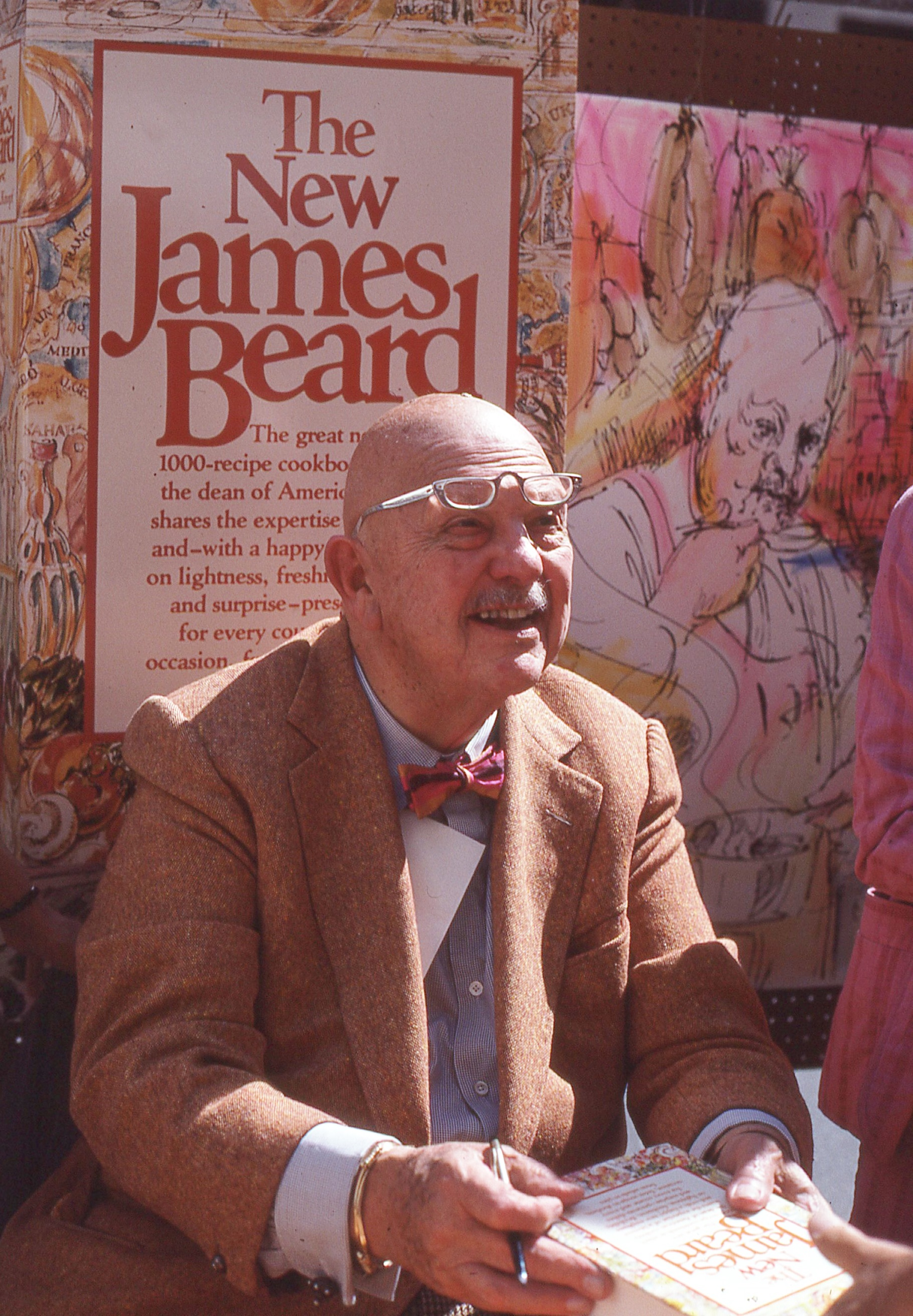
James Beard, chef and television personality

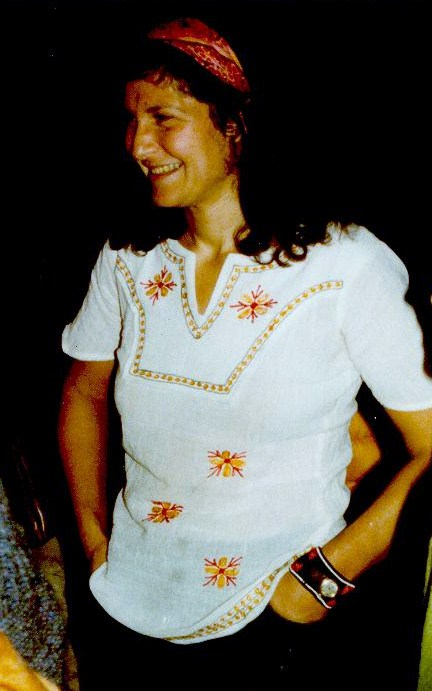
Arlene Blum, mountaineer

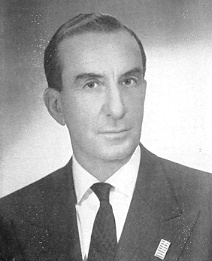
Emilio Pucci, fashion designer

Notable Reed alumni include Tektronix co-founder Howard Vollum (1936), physicist James J. Brady (1927), businessman John Sperling (1948), linguistic anthropologist Dell Hymes (1950), Pulitzer Prize-winning poet Gary Snyder (1951), fantasy author David Eddings (1954), distance learning pioneer John Bear (1959), socialist and feminist activist and author Barbara Ehrenreich (1963), radio personality Dr. Demento (1963), programmer, software publisher, author, and philanthropist Peter Norton (1965), former U.S. Secretary of the Navy Richard Danzig (1965), alpinist and biophysical chemist Arlene Blum (1966), chemist Mary Jo Ondrechen (1974), computer engineer Daniel Kottke (1976), Wikipedia co-founder Larry Sanger (1991), actor Morgan Spector (2002), and U.S. Representative Marie Gluesenkamp Perez (2012).

Among those who attended but did not graduate from Reed are Academy Award-nominated actress Hope Lange, chef James Beard, horse rancher and conspiracy theorist Christopher Langan, musician Ry Cooder, and Apple co-founder and former CEO Steve Jobs.

Notable Reed faculty of the past and present include former U.S. Senator from Illinois Paul Douglas, and physicists Richard Crandall and David Griffiths.

== In popular culture ==
Reed has been featured in several books and movies. It is often presented as an enigmatic, eccentric institution at which people who do not fit into mainstream society come together to learn.

=== Literature ===
- Blue Like Jazz (2003) by Donald Miller is a semi-autobiographical account of the author's life, and details the author's encounters with other Reed students while auditing classes there in the early 2000s.
- The Other (2008) by David Guterson depicts a Reed College student who drops out after his freshman year to live a solitary life in the Olympic Mountains.
- Steve Jobs (2011) by Walter Isaacson is a biography commissioned by Steve Jobs, a Reed College dropout, and contains a chapter on Jobs's experience attending Reed College.

=== Film ===
The Reed College campus has been the set of several motion pictures since 1977.

- The Possessed (1977) is a made-for-television horror film that follows an undead priest who fights demonic forces at a women's college in Salem, Oregon.
- First Love (1977) depicts a love story between a male college soccer player and an attractive female student who is loved by another man.
- Feast of Love (2007) depicts the story of a group of friends who live in Portland, Oregon, the film is composed of vignettes, some of which were filmed on the Reed College campus.
- Into the Wild (2007) is an adaptation of the Jon Krakauer book of the same name published in 1996, Reed College was used as a stand in during some scenes for Emory University.
- Blue Like Jazz (2012) is the film adaptation of the book by Donald Miller; the film is set and partially filmed at Reed College. The film follows the story of a religiously disillusioned Texan native who moves to the progressive Pacific Northwest to attend Reed College.

== See also ==
- List of Reed College people
- List of Reed College buildings
