= Eliot Hall (Reed College) =

Building at Reed College, Portland, Oregon, U.S.

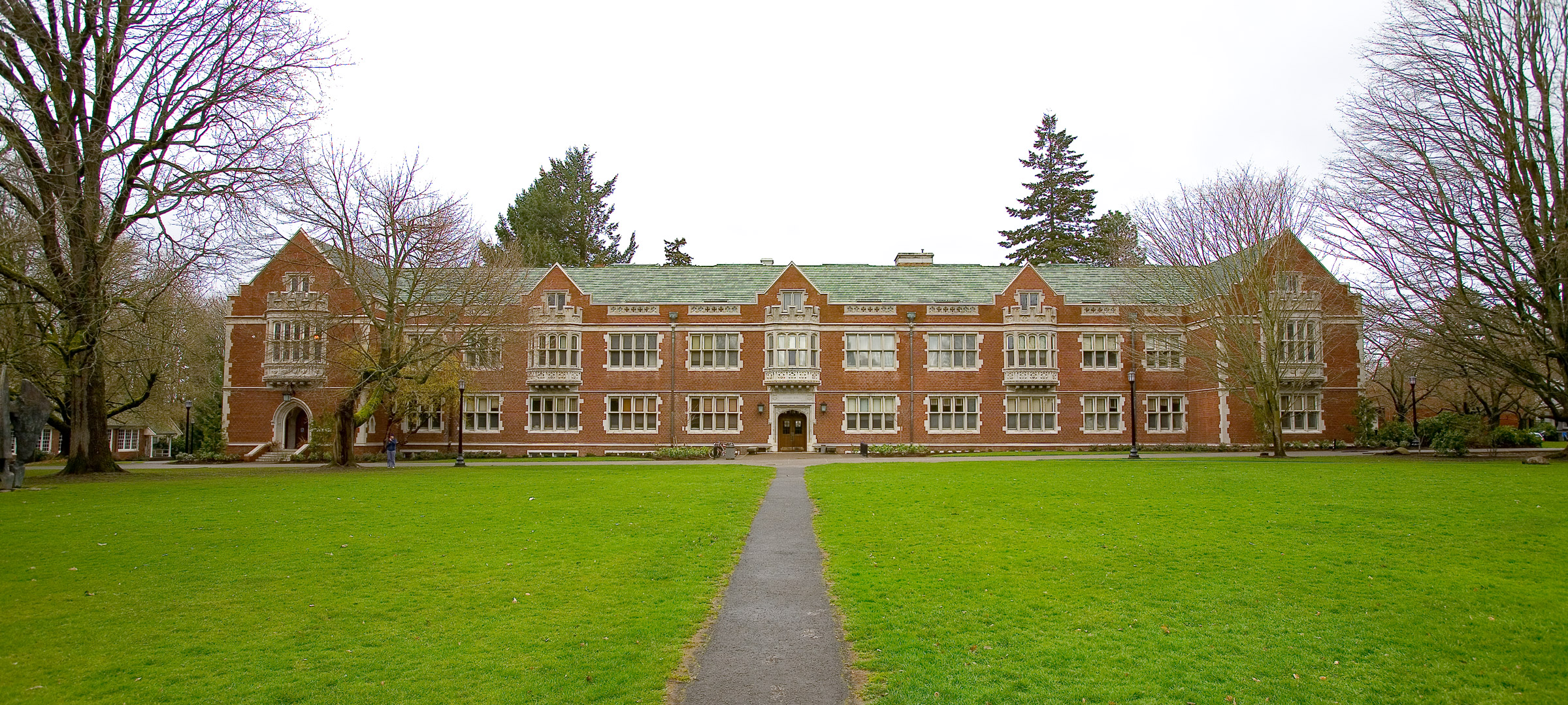
- The building's exterior in 2007

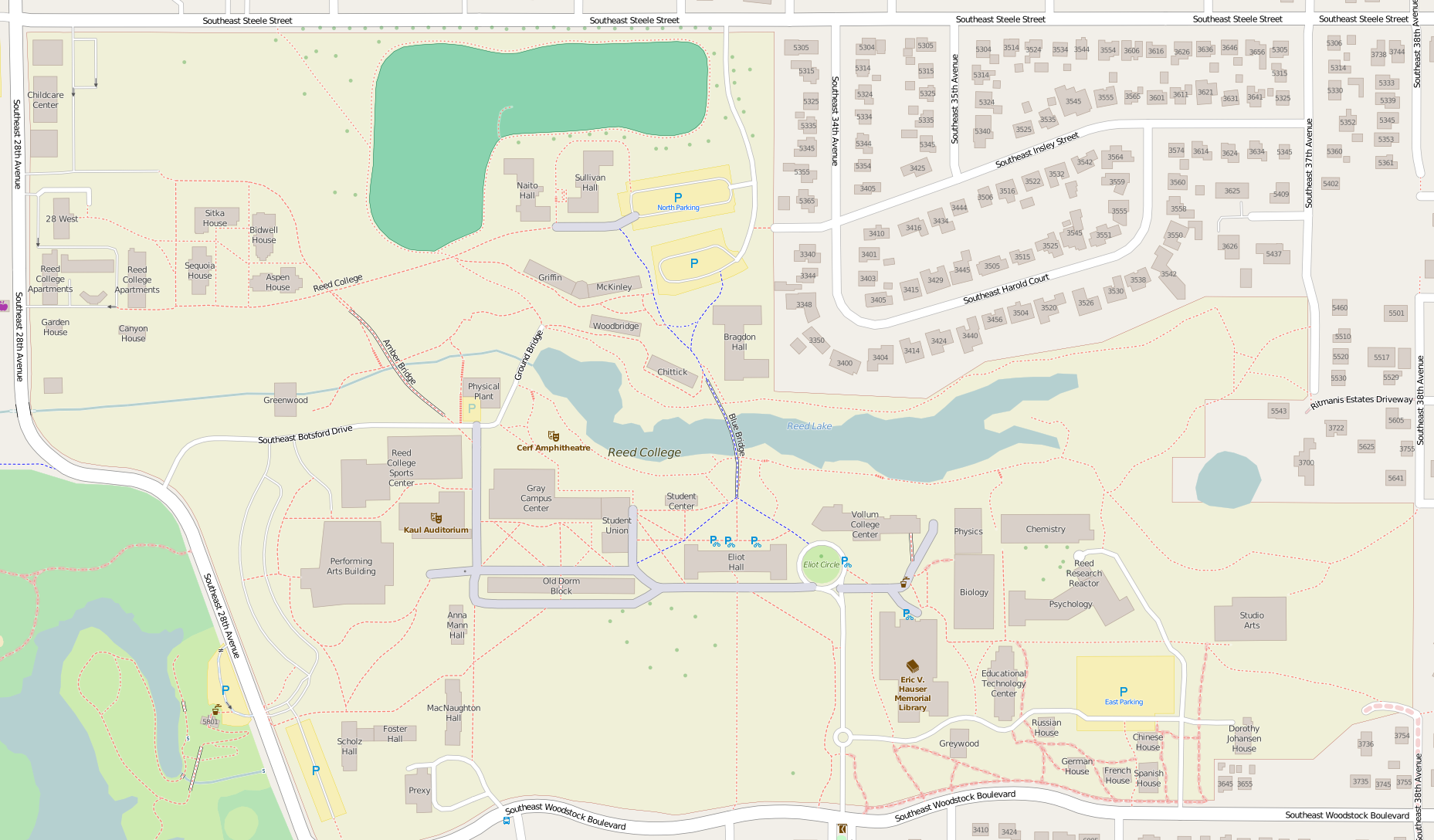
- Location on the Reed College campus

General information
- Location: Reed College, Portland, Oregon, United States
- Coordinates: 45.48098°N 122.63035°W
- Opened: 1912

Eliot Hall is the primary administrative building of Reed College in Portland, Oregon, designed by Albert Ernest Doyle and built in 1912. The building was one of the first buildings constructed at the college. The name was changed to Eliot Hall when it was dedicated to Thomas Lamb Eliot in 1935 and subsequently remodeled. Inspired by St John's College, Oxford, its architecture contains elements of Tudor and Collegiate Gothic.

== History ==
=== Background ===
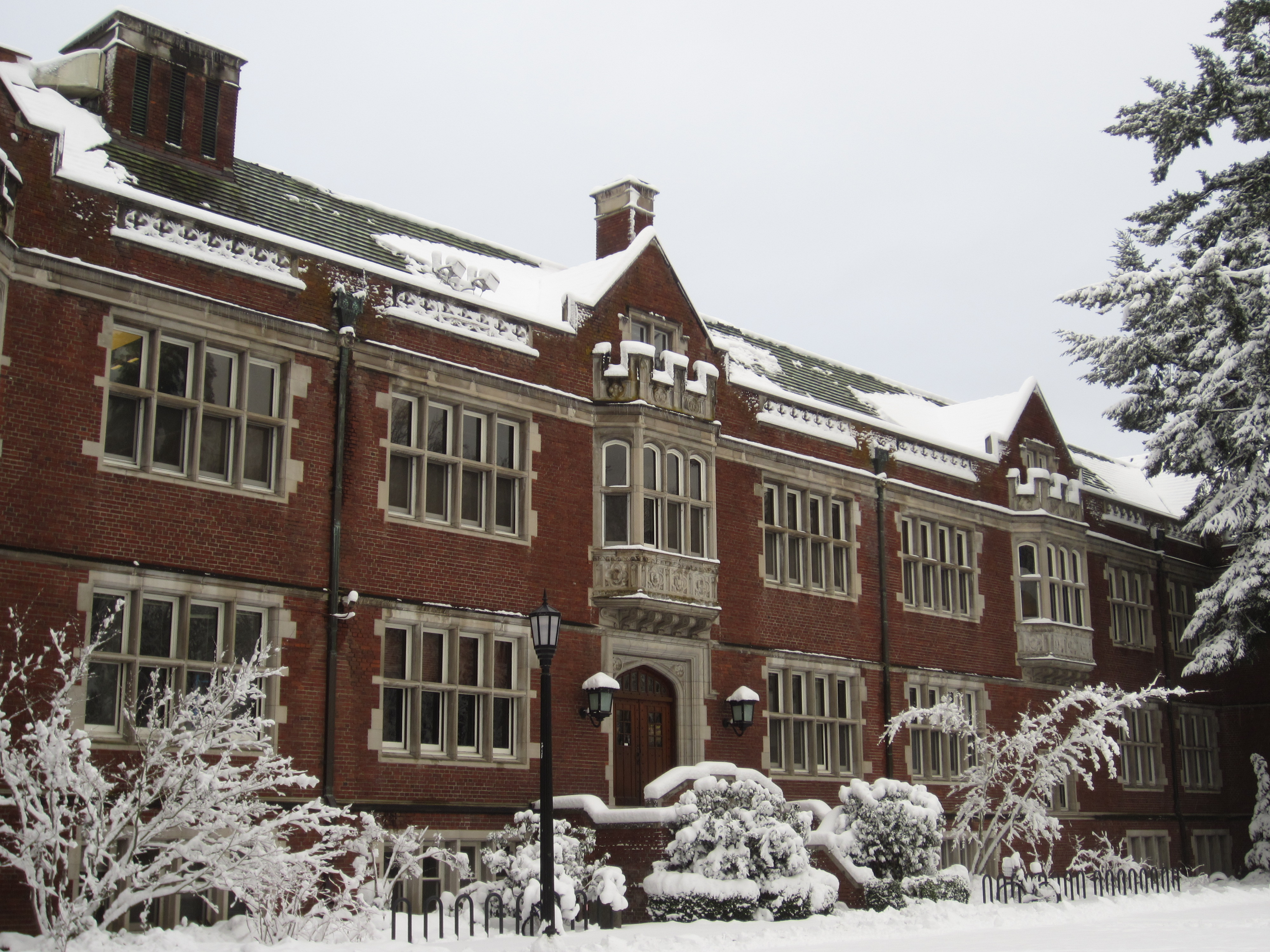
Exterior in January 2017

Thomas Lamb Eliot, who would later become Eliot Hall's namesake in 1935, was the founder of the Oregon Humane Society, the first minister of the First Unitarian Church in Portland, and the first president of Reed College's Board of Trustees until 1924. Having met Simeon Gannett Reed and his wife Amanda, Reed College's namesakes, through his work as a minister, he wrote to the Reeds in 1887 with the idea of creating a liberal institution of arts and sciences. Although the Reeds passed away before the school was officially founded, Amanda left Eliot $2 million in her will; plans for developing the school began in 1906.

=== Development, construction, and later history ===
Eliot approached architect A. E. Doyle to help design the campus buildings, including Eliot Hall, under the name of the Arts and Science Building. After going through various plans and designs, he decided that the first few buildings, including Eliot Hall, would be built in the Collegiate Gothic style based on St. John's College in Oxford and the Tudor Gothic style. Construction began in 1912. Eliot Hall was one of the first buildings constructed for Reed College. It was designed to function as the campus' primary academic building when the school opened. It originally contained the administration office, lecture rooms, and laboratories for the various fields of study, and later, a museum, library, and chapel. It held various departments such as biology, chemistry, physics, and graphic design and was named the Arts and Science Building. Since the campus was set to open in September 1912 for the upcoming school year, Doyle had roughly eight months to complete construction. While most of the building was completed in time for the school's grand opening, the chapel was left unfinished and would not be completed until 1913.

The building was renamed in honor of Thomas Eliot in 1935 and was remodeled in the same year. It was designated a Portland historic landmark in 1970.

=== Remodeling ===
The building's interior has been subject to several remodeling projects. The first change was the library, which was moved in 1930 and became its own separate building. As attendance grew and other buildings were added to the campus, most of the science departments were relocated, including the biology and physics departments, which were relocated in 1949 and 1959, respectively. The fourth floor and east entrance were remodeled in 1964—areas in which most of the offices and laboratories had been were removed. In 1966, the chemistry department was relocated and replaced with a print shop and a calligraphy studio as part of the new graphic design program.

== Description ==
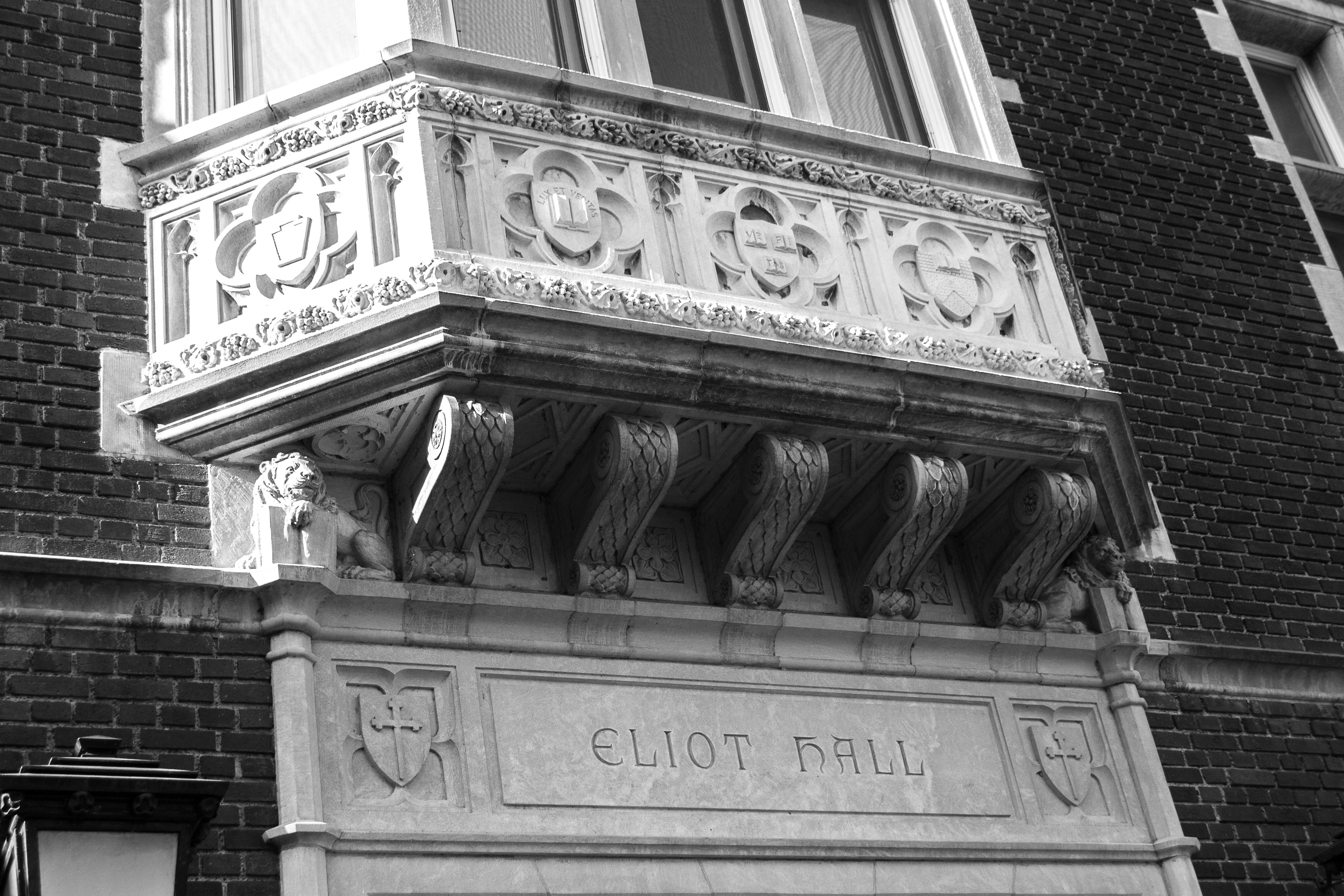
Detail of the building's Tudor Gothic architecture, 2013

Doyle decided to use the Tudor and Collegiate styles for the building's design and drew up plans accordingly. The main materials chosen in the construction were red brick and limestone for their long-lasting qualities and to make the building more aesthetically pleasing. The brick was patterned in an English bond style; limestone was added to reinforce the building's structure. The mortar joints contain multicolored pea gravel added for aesthetic purposes and to provide the joints with extra strength. Most of the windows are oriel windows with wooden frames, although some have been remodeled to have metal frames instead. Although many of the windows are not arched, the chapel's windows include Gothic arches. Below them are seals carved into the limestone to honor various universities. The roof itself is designed in a false gable style and is tiled with green tiles. The total cost of the construction was roughly $218,000.

The building itself contains four floors and seven entrances. The main entrance was designed with a Tudor arch with limestone panels surrounding it. The first floor is actually a daylight basement, while the second floor serves as the main entrance to the building. The third floor houses the chapel and various offices, and the fourth floor contains classrooms and offices. While the first and fourth floors have narrow halls and low ceilings, the second and third floors feature wider hallways with polished concrete or wood floors, along with higher ceilings.

=== Chapel ===
The Chapel is located on the west side of the building, on the third floor. Although classes began in 1912, construction of the chapel would not be completed until 1913. Several of the chapel's features were inspired by 10th-century architecture. It contains a high ceiling supported by wooden beams from which several lamps hang. The chairs, floor, and most of the walls are oak. At one end of the Chapel is a stage, where the remnants of a defunct pipe organ rest. A member of Reed's Board of Trustees dedicated the organ to his wife. In addition to lectures, the chapel was also used for concerts, to show movies and even host theatrical plays. Wedding ceremonies were also performed in the Chapel. Just above one of the chapel doors on the southwest side of the building rests the college's seal, adorned with a griffin, a fleur-de-lis and a Richmond rose. The Richmond rose pays tribute to the city of Portland, Oregon, the city of roses. The fleur-de-lis was based on the ones found at Washington University, to pay tribute to Thomas Eliot and his alma mater. The griffin was taken from the Reed family coat of arms and honors the college's namesake.
