= Doyle Owl =

Unofficial mascot of Reed College

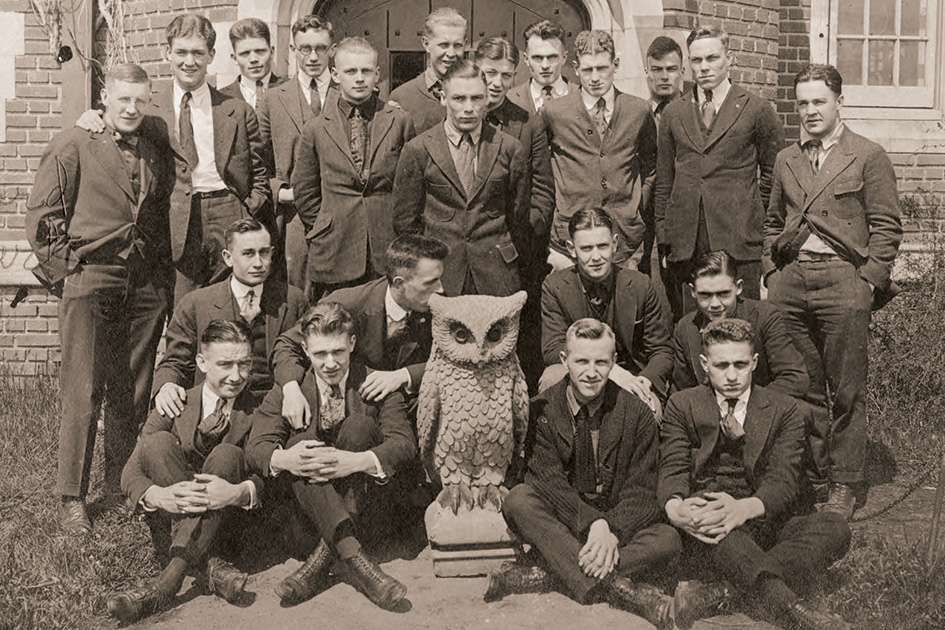
Reed College students with Doyle Owl, c. 1920

The Doyle Owl, or Strigidus cementus, according The New (Olde) Reed Almanac, "is the unofficial mascot of Reed College (the official mascot being the griffin)". It is a concrete statue of an owl, roughly three-foot high, and 300 pound (136 kg), that originally occupied the lawn of a Portland resident.

== History ==
One night in 1913, the Owl was stolen from the lawn by residents of the Doyle dormitory, part of Reed's Old Dorm Block. The Owl was promptly hoisted atop the dorm building, where it drew the attention and envy of neighboring dorms. According to the 2006–2007 Student Body Handbook, however, the Doyle Owl may have originated as an ornament atop the Doyle dorm, from which it was removed as a "dorm memento".

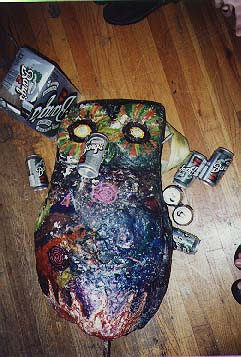
The Doyle Owl in 1996

The Owl was first stolen in a 1913 dorm war. Another dorm kidnapped nine residents of Doyle, offering to exchange the captives for the Owl. This did not work and the "hostages" escaped. The same rival dorm staged a two-hour siege on Doyle, featuring water, mud, and ammonia bombs. Doyle countered by using a firehose, but the tradition had been born. Over the years the Owl has been stolen countless times. An odd ritual has accompanied this thievery. Whenever it is stolen, the thieves must flaunt it at a "showing," where elaborate measures are taken to display the Owl while reducing the odds of it being re-stolen by a new group. The resulting brawl often involves the majority of the student body.

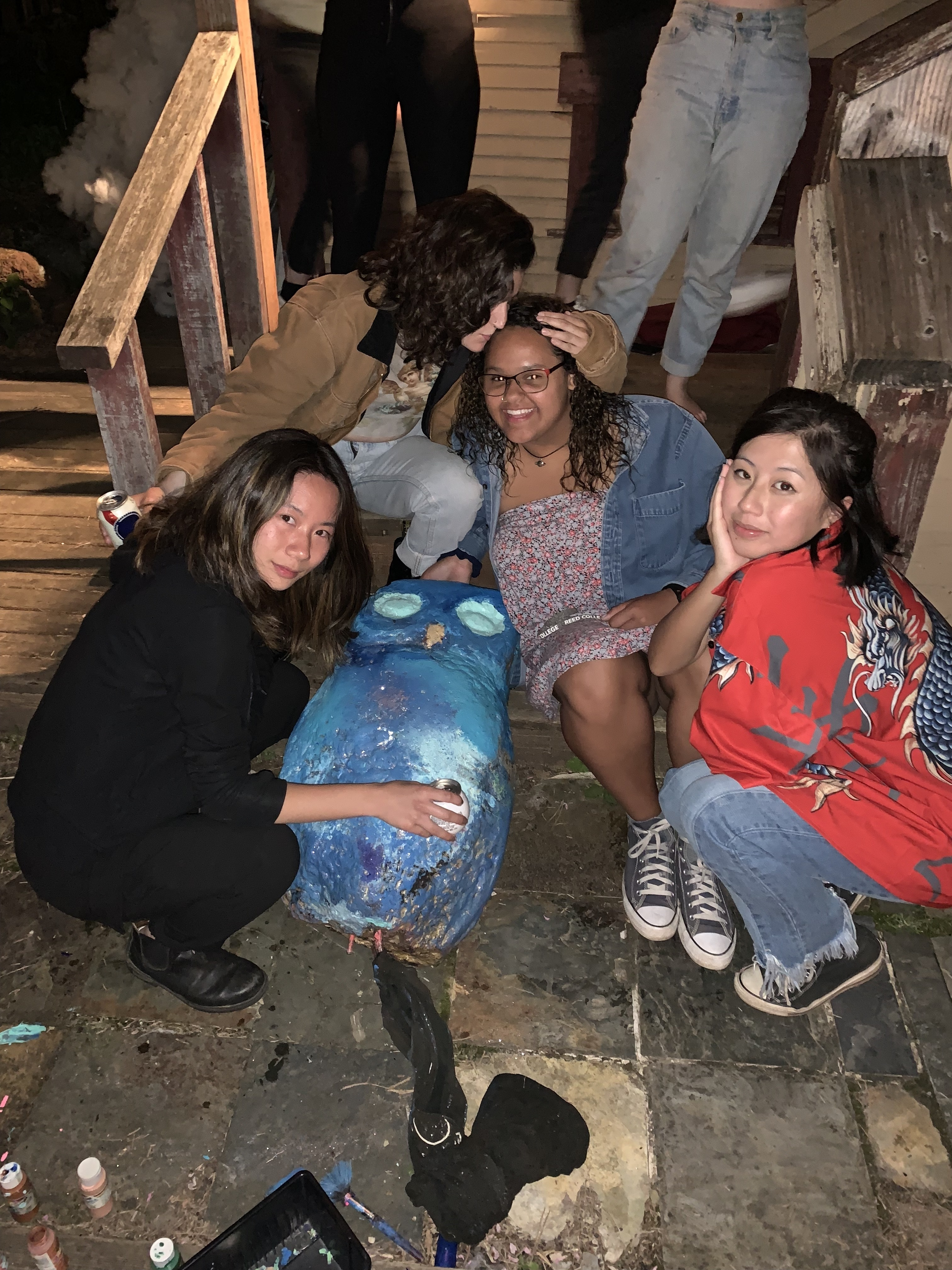
Reed College students and Doyle Owl, Spring 2019

The Owl appeared hidden in the grass in the "Sowing the Seeds of Love" music video for the band Tears for Fears after video editor Mike Quinn told Director Jim Blashfield about the Doyle Owl tradition at Reed, where his younger brother was a student. Other "showings" have included encasing it in ice, covering it in Vaseline while hanging it off the Blue Bridge, setting it on fire (using baking oil) and throwing it out the back of a speeding car. In 2014, the Doyle Owl was rumored to have been inside a snowball 40-inches in diameter. But when maintenance workers cut through the snowball, The Oregonian reported, "The Doyle Owl was nowhere to be found."

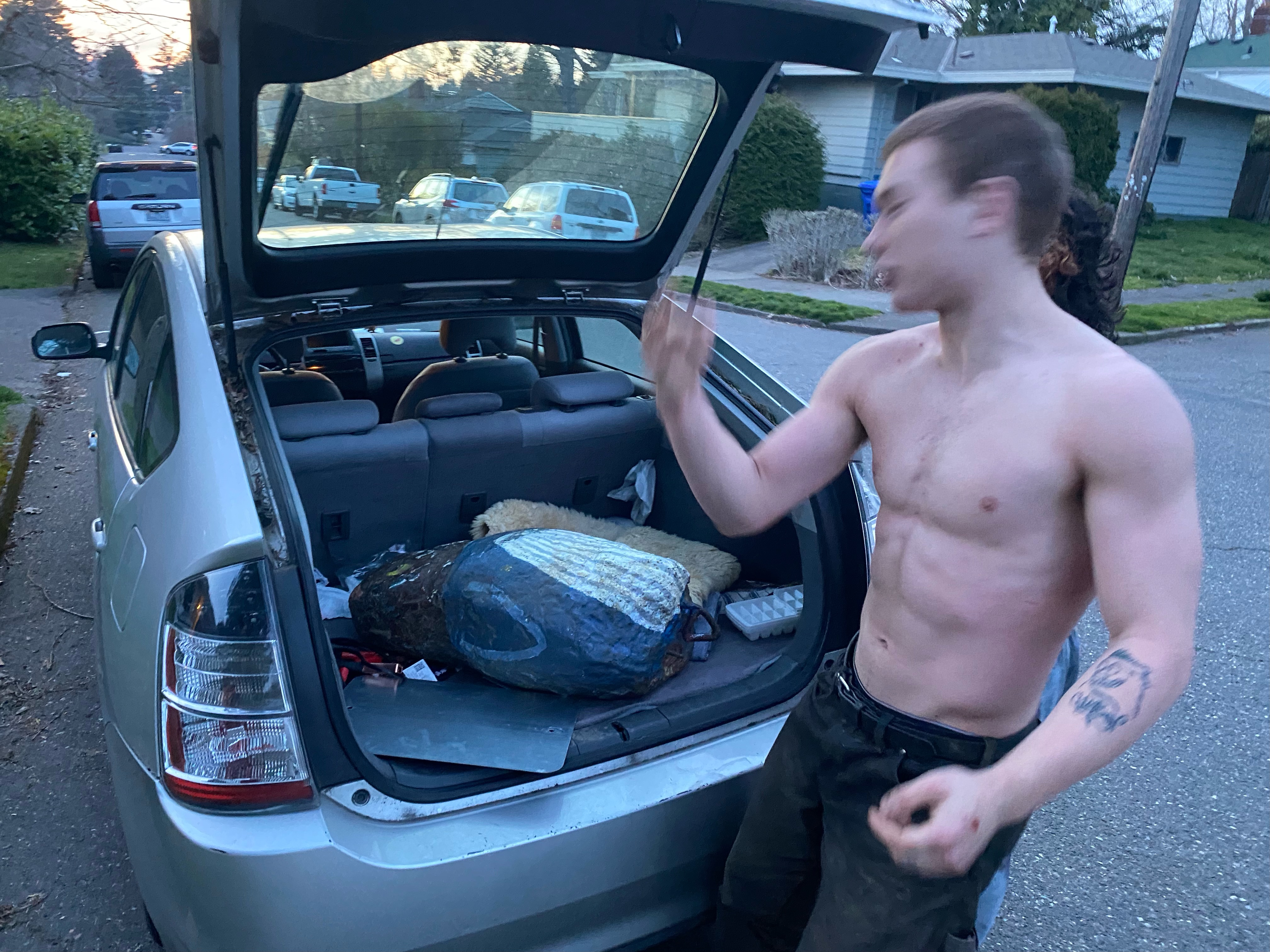
Student with the Doyle Owl, 2022

Temporary possessors of the Owl also traditionally take pictures of themselves next to it, to prove their possession, and pictures of the Owl in strange places and with unusual people have become de rigueur. It has been seen in the United States at Disneyland, in Seattle, in San Francisco, and in Lincoln, Nebraska. The Owl has been pictured in the company of Steve Jobs and Dr. Demento. The Reed Office of Admissions feeds the air of myth surrounding the Owl, with its website claiming Owl sightings in Paris, France, and in Jakarta, Indonesia. The Oregonian reported, "three-foot tall bird has been spotted on the Eiffel Tower; taking in the sights of New York City and visiting the shark tank at Sea World in San Diego".

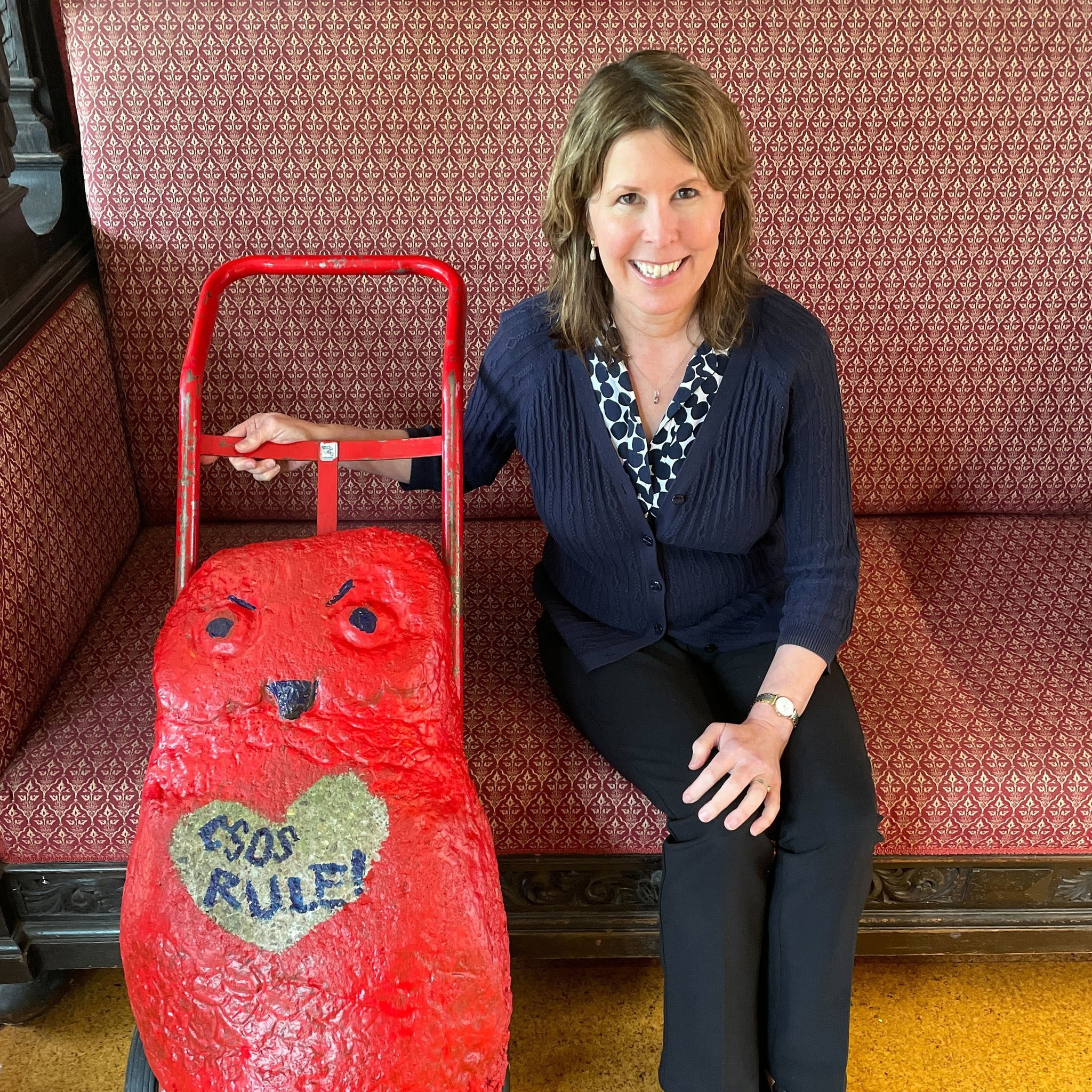
Reed president Audrey Bilger with the Doyle Owl after it was taken by Community Safety Officers in the spring of 2024. The owl was quickly repainted by students.

The Doyle Owl is listed in the Dictionary of American Slang as meaning, "both hideously ugly and extremely desirable".
