= Eric V. Hauser Memorial Library =

Building at Reed College, Portland, Oregon, U.S.

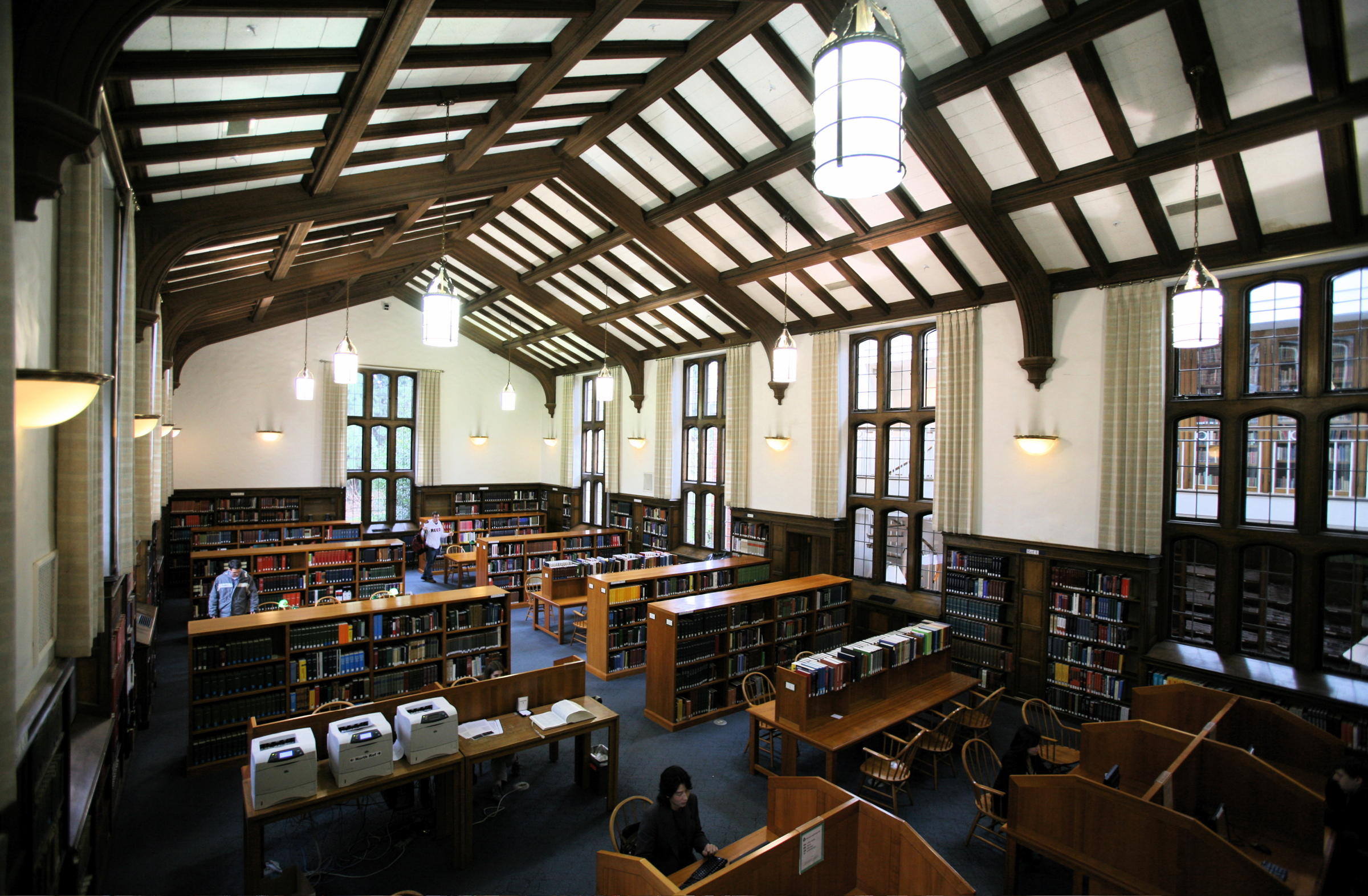
- The library's interior, 2007

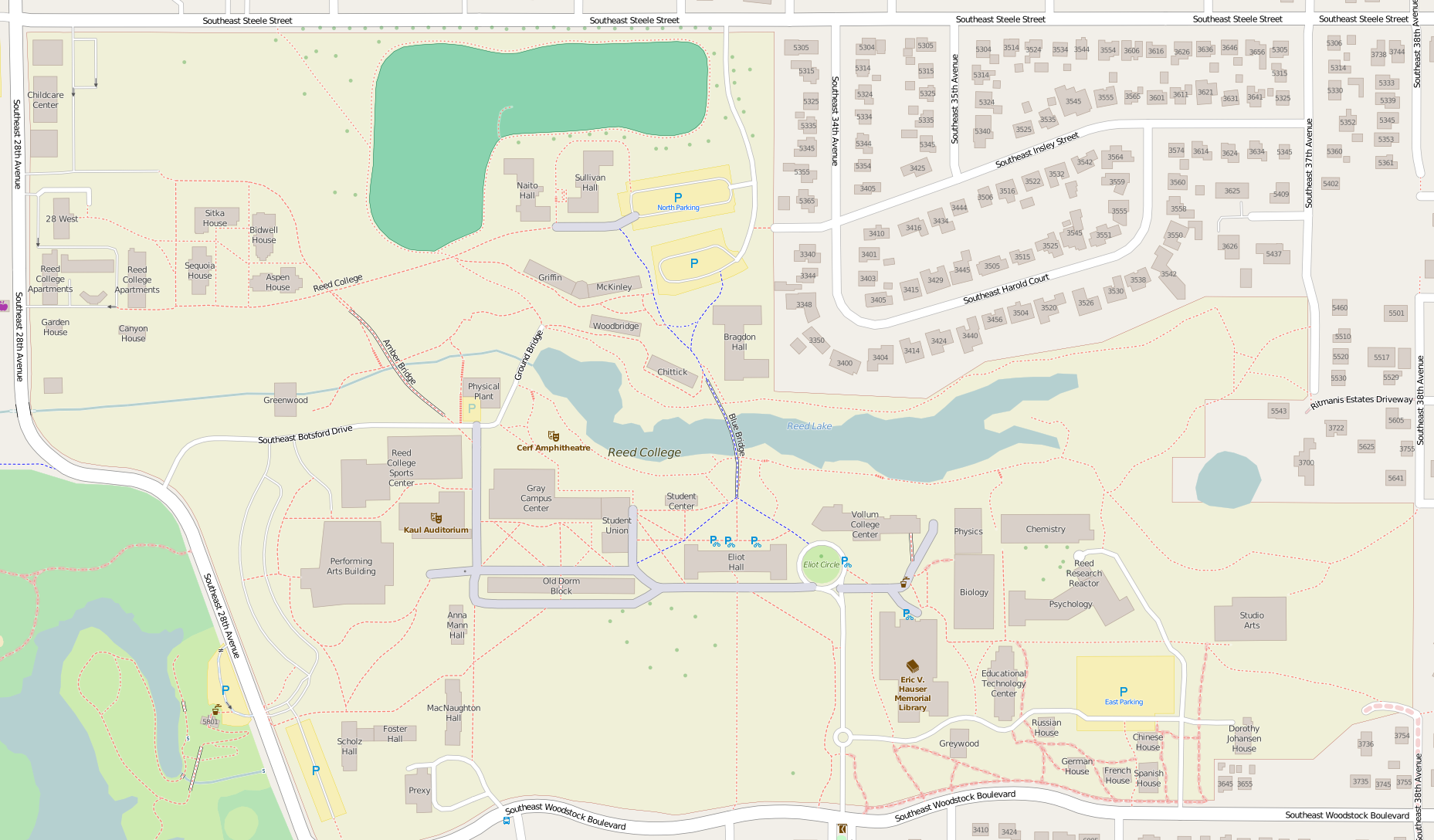
- Location on the Reed College campus

General information
- Location: Reed College, Portland, Oregon, United States
- Coordinates: 45.48023°N 122.62862°W

The Eric V. Hauser Memorial Library is a library located on the Reed College campus in southeast Portland, Oregon, in the United States.

== History ==
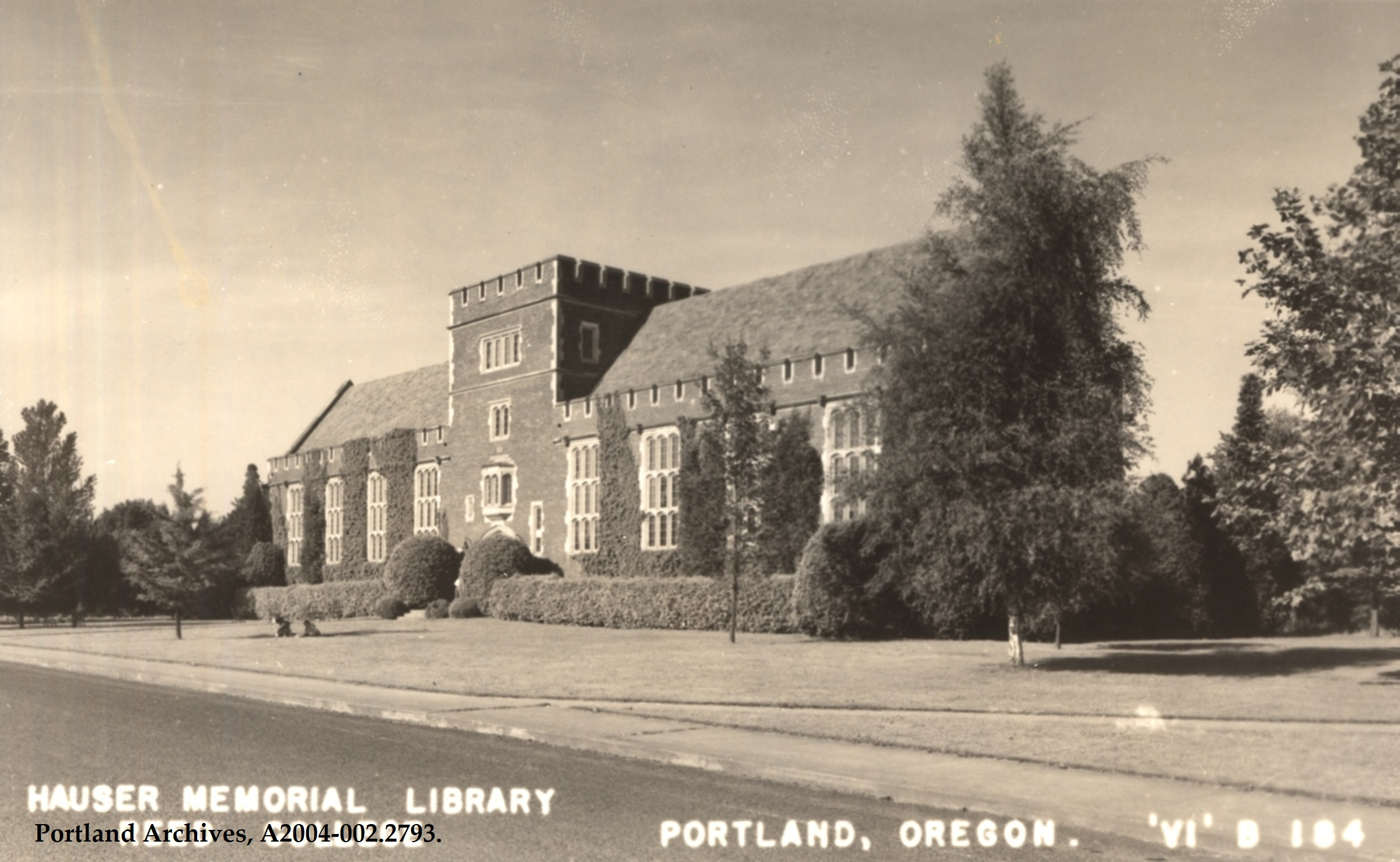
Eric V. Hauser Memorial Library in 1958.

The library was constructed in 1930 and named for Eric V. Hauser, who provided the endowment for the library's initial construction. The library has frequently been renovated and expanded since, such as in 1989 when a postmodern gothic addition was made, or in 2002 when a four story renovation was completed. In 2001, Reed received a $1 million grant from the Bill & Melinda Gates Foundation to support the colleges’ integrated learning initiative, which included the expansion of the library and the construction of an educational technology center.
