= Pedestrian Bridge (Reed College) =

Bridge in Portland, Oregon, U.S.

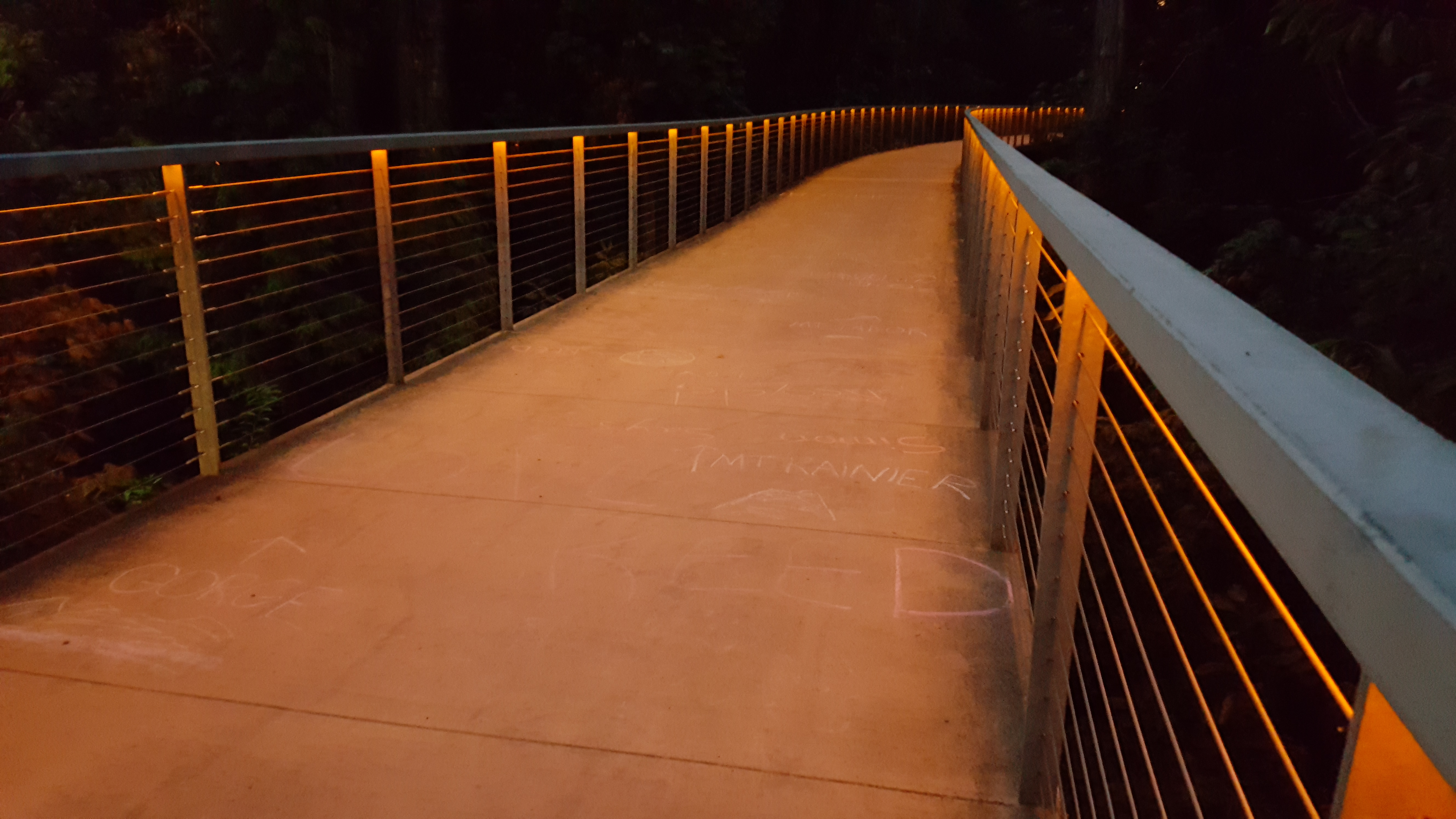
- The bridge in 2016
- Coordinates: 45.48231°N 122.63372°W
- Carries: Bicyclists; pedestrians
- Crosses: Reed Lake
- Locale: Reed College, Portland, Oregon, U.S.
- Other names: Amber Bridge; Bouncy Bridge; Pedestrian Bridge and Troll Habitat
- Owner: Reed College

History
- Architect: ZGF Architects
- Opened: 2008

Location
- Interactive map of Pedestrian Bridge

The Pedestrian Bridge, nicknamed the "Amber Bridge" and "Bouncy Bridge", and certified by the city as the "Pedestrian Bridge and Troll Habitat", is a footbridge on the Reed College campus in southeast Portland, Oregon, in the United States. The bridge was designed by ZGF Architects and opened in 2008.

== Description ==
The bridge was designed by ZGF Architects and features lighting on the bridge deck and railings. The handrails have solid state LED lighting. According to the lighting design company Luma, the bridge's amber color was selected to differentiate it from the nearby Blue Bridge.

== History ==
In 2016, writers for the student-run creative magazine The Grail said, "Commissioned in 2008, this bridge was put in place with the Grove to provide easier passage to the new dorms and to discourage students from trudging off-trail through the canyon to get to the Northwest corner of campus. The bouncy bridge was built with environmental protections in mind." Hoffman Construction was the contractor.

The bridge has been part of the course for the Reed 5K Odyssey, a race to benefit local elementary schools. In March 2013, during spring break, the bridge and other Reed College sites served as filming locations for the television series Grimm. It was closed temporarily in October 2014 after a tree fell on it because of strong winds and rain. The Pedestrian Bridge helped influence the design of Washington County's Augusta Lane Bicycle and Pedestrian Bridge. In 2024, an art installation with 1,261 weathergrams bearing the names of people in Reed's Eliot Society estate planning program were temporarily attached to the bridge.

== See also ==
- Troll
