= ZGF Architects =

American architectural firm founded 1942

ZGF Architects LLP
- Type: Private; Limited Liability Partnership
- Industry: Architecture
- Founded: 1942
- Headquarters: twelve west, Portland, Oregon, US; 45°31′19″N 122°41′1″W
- Key people: Sharron van der Meulen, Managing Partner
- Revenue: $245 million
- Number of employees: 750
- Website: www.zgf.com

ZGF Architects LLP (ZGF), formerly Zimmer Gunsul Frasca Partnership, is an American architectural firm based in Portland, Oregon. It was founded in 1942 and has seven offices in the United States and Canada.

== History ==
The company was founded in 1942 in Portland. In July 2009, the company moved into a new headquarters on Southwest 12th Avenue and Washington Street in downtown Portland, from Southwest Third and Oak.

== Operations ==
As of 2024, ZGF has offices in Seattle, Los Angeles, Washington D.C., New York City, Denver, and Vancouver B.C., in addition to the headquarters in Portland. The Portland headquarters, the largest architecture firm in Portland, is the largest of the offices, employing about 280 people. Since 2013, the firm's managing partner has been Ted Hyman.

== Projects ==
- Stations and overpasses of the MAX Blue Line, the first line of the MAX Light Rail system (1983).
- Oregon Convention Center (completed 1990)
- LDS Conference Center, Salt Lake City, Utah (completed 2000)
- Pedestrian Bridge (Reed College)
- Southport (Renton, Washington)
- Yeon Building, Gresham, Oregon
- Portland International Airport terminal expansion
- SDSU Transit Center
