= Weese =

Weese may refer to:

== Places ==
- Weese, Randolph County, West Virginia
- Weese, Webster County, West Virginia

== People with the name Weese ==
- Ben Weese (born 1929), American architect
- Harry Weese (1915–1998), American architect
- John Aaron Weese (1891–1981), Canadian politician
- Miranda Weese, American ballet dancer
- Norris Weese (1951–1995), American football player
