= List of Reed College buildings =

List of buildings on the Reed College campus in Portland, Oregon, U.S.

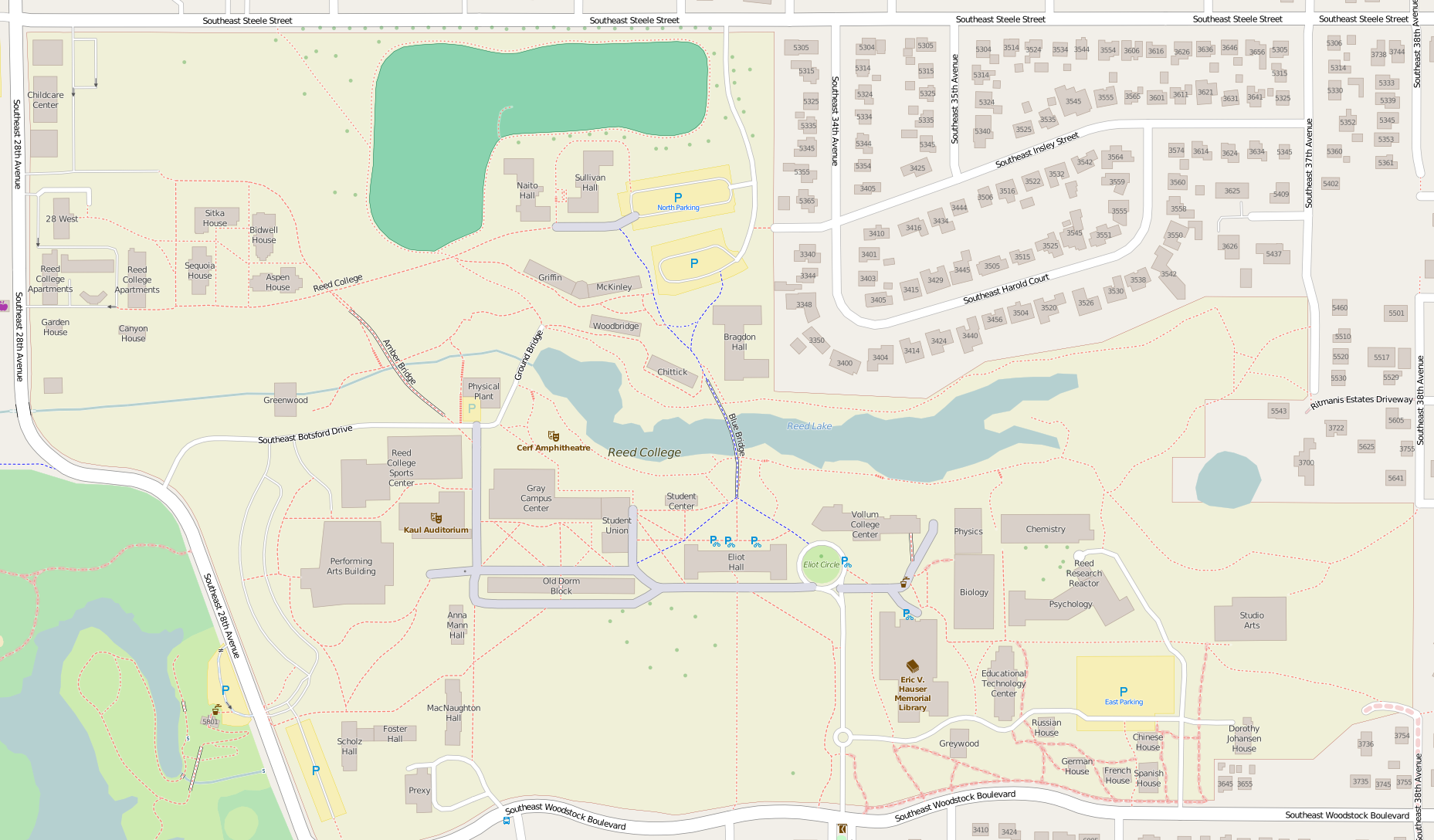
Map of the Reed College campus

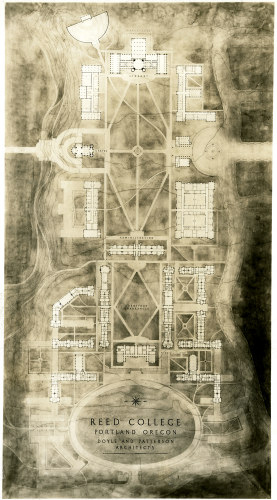
A. E. Doyle's master plan (1920)

The Reed College campus includes academic buildings, dormitories and houses, administration and service buildings, student centers and other buildings. Academic buildings include the A. A. Knowlton Laboratory of Physics, Arthur F. Scott Laboratory of Chemistry (1992), Center for Advanced Computation, Educational Technology Center (2002), L.E. Griffin Memorial Biology Building, and Psychology Building. Buildings primarily used for the arts and performance include Kaul Auditorium, Studio Art Building, the Performing Arts Building, and Theatre Annex Building. The Annex features main stage and black box theaters with additional rooms for instruction and rehearsals, plus storage space sometimes called Reed Warehouse.

The campus features several residence halls. The Old Dorm Block was built in 1912 and features eight residence halls: Abington, Doyle, Eastport, Kerr, Ladd, Quincy, Westport and Winch. Bragdon, Chittick, Griffin, McKinley and Woodbridge Halls, known collectively as the Cross Canyon Residence Halls, are separated from the campus by Reed Canyon and are used primarily for first-year students. The group of buildings are within a grassy, wooded area; their smaller size and close proximity "foster a strong sense of community" among students. Chittick, Griffin, McKinley and Woodbridge are each named after early faculty members and house 28 residents. Bragdon Hall is the newest of the Cross Canyon dormitories, constructed in 1998. The French, German, Russian and Spanish Houses, known collectively as the Woodstock Language Houses, were designed by A. E. Doyle and built in 1922. Once used as housing for faculty, residents living in these buildings primarily converse in their respective languages and sponsor community events. The Foster and Scholz buildings, constructed during 1954–1955, were once a single residence hall for male students called Foster-Scholz. MacNaughton was built at the same time for female students. All three residence halls, named after former Reed College presidents, now serve as coed dormitories with divided double rooms. Anna Mann was originally built for female students, but is now coed. The Birchwood and Reed College Apartments offer fully furnished units and are available to students following their first year. The Garden House, acquired in 1991 and renovated in 1994, houses just ten students. Naito Hall and Sullivan Hall, built in 1997, house 160 residents and offer common areas, kitchens and views of the Tualatin Mountains. The Grove, comprising Sequoia, Bidwell, Aspen, and Sitka, was completed in 2008 and provides house-like amenities. In 2019, the Trillium residence hall was completed, located between the sports fields and the Grove.

Service buildings include 28 West, which houses offices for Community Safety and Residence Life, and the Dorothy Johansen House, a former residence of a Reed College graduate and professor that now houses the academic support services. The Health and Counseling Center, built as the Glenn Chesney Quiett Infirmary in 1938, offers health and counseling services to students. Greywood, originally constructed for a community center in Vancouver, Washington was moved to the campus in 1946. The building has served a variety of functions, but now houses the alumni and parent relations program, College Relations Information Systems (CRIS), and career services.

Other buildings include the Aubrey R. Watzek Sports Center, constructed in 1965 to replace the original gym built in 1913. The Parker House, an Arts and Crafts-style home designed by Morris H. Whitehouse in 1929 for Mary Evans Parker, was purchased by Reed College in 2005; much of its gardens, part of Florence Holmes Gerke's original design, still exist.

== Buildings ==
Name	Description	Image(s)	Ref.
28 West	28 West houses the offices for Community Safety and Residence Life. Community Safety Officers (CSOs) patrol the campus, provide community services and respond to emergencies. The Residence Life office maintains the on-campus living experience and oversees community-focused programming; the staff includes professional Resident Directors and student House Advisors.	28 West in 2013	
A. A. Knowlton Laboratory of Physics	In 1967, the biology building was upgraded and expanded, creating the A. A. Knowlton Laboratory of Physics in recognition of longtime physics professor Ansel Alphonso Knowlton. Advanced technologies available to students include a cosmic ray muon detector, helium refrigeration system, nitrogen laser, photocapacitance system, spectrometers and sputum culture, plus laboratories for astrophysics and scientific computation.	A. A. Knowlton Laboratory of Physics in 2013	
Anna Mann	Bequested by Anna Mann, this building originally served as housing for female students. The building was remodeled and expanded in 1993. Now coed, Anna Mann's first floor offers a sitting room and sun porch; many of the rooms include fireplaces, hardwood floors and window seats.	Anna Mann in 2013	
Arthur F. Scott Laboratory of Chemistry	Named after former chemistry professor and Reed College president Arthur F. Scott, the Laboratory of Chemistry was built in 1992 with offices and research laboratories for faculty and students. Advanced technologies available to students include a diffractometer, polarimeter, spectrometers, plus laser and computational laboratories, the latter of which features Silicon Graphics stations.	Arthur F. Scott Laboratory of Chemistry in 2013	
Aspen House		Aspen House in 2012	
Aubrey R. Watzek Sports Center	The original gym, built in 1913, was demolished in 1965 for the construction of the Sports Center. The center was named after Aubrey R. Watzek, a board member who served from 1931 to 1942 and also offered financial resources for construction of the biology building. Renovated in 2002, the center features a dance studio, two gyms, an indoor pool, a martial arts room, racquetball and squash courts, saunas and a weight room.	Aubrey R. Watzek Sports Center in 2013	
Bidwell House		Bidwell House in 2013	
Birchwood Apartments	The Birchwood Apartments are fully furnished, with kitchens, living rooms, and the option of one or two bedrooms.	Birchwood Apartments in 2013	
Bragdon Hall	Part of the Cross Canyon Residence Halls, along with Chittick, Griffin, McKinley and Woodbridge Halls, Bragdon was built in 1998 and named after a former Reed College president. Bragdon is the newest of the Cross Canyon dormitories and houses 65 students. The building includes indoor bike storage, kitchens, lounges, a laundry room and a storage room.	Bragdon Hall in 2013	
Canyon House		Canyon House in 2012	
Center for Advanced Computation	The Center for Advanced Computation is located on the eastern side of the campus and provides a space for students, faculty and visitors to conduct research and offer seminars in the field of computation. The center hosts the Artificial Life Lab, a research group dedicated to the study of biological, cultural and economic systems.	Center for Advanced Computation in 2013	
Chinese House		Chinese House in 2013	
Chittick Hall	Part of the Cross Canyon Residence Halls, along with Bragdon, Griffin, McKinley and Woodbridge Halls, Chittick is named after an early faculty member and serves to house 28 students, mostly during their first year. Chittick includes a kitchen, laundry room, and a three-level social room with a fireplace, plus a third-floor balcony with views of Reed Canyon. The hall is coed by alternate rooms and offers singles, divided and undivided doubles, and divided triples.	Chittick Hall in 2013	
Dorothy Johansen House	The Dorothy Johansen House is the former residence of Reed College graduate, history professor and archivist Dorothy Johansen. The building now houses the academic support services.	Dorothy Johansen House in 2013	
Educational Technology Center	The 23,000-square foot Educational Technology Center was completed in 2002. The building houses teaching and technology resources for faculty, staff and students, including classrooms, three 24-hour information resource centers, and multimedia facilities. The center also provides hardware and software resources, including a computer repair shop. Reed's computing services staff and faculty offices for the classics and religion departments also reside within the building.	Educational Technology Center in 2012	
Eliot Hall		Eliot Hall in 2007	
Eric V. Hauser Memorial Library		Eric V. Hauser Memorial Library in 2007	
Farm House		Farm House in 2013	
Foster	The Foster and Scholz buildings, built during 1954–1955, were once a single residence hall for male students called Foster-Scholz. Foster, named after former Reed College president William T. Foster, currently serves as a coed dormitory with divided double rooms.	Foster in 2013	
French House	The French, German, Russian and Spanish Houses, known collectively as the Woodstock Language Houses, were designed by A. E. Doyle and built in 1922. Once used for faculty residence, French-speaking students (aided by live-in scholars and native speakers) now reside in the French House. Residents primarily converse in French and sponsor community events.	French House in 2013	
Garden House	The Garden House is a residence hall that houses ten students and often has a "dorm theme". Acquired in 1991 and renovated in 1994, the House is accessible by a short walk away from the center of campus via Reed Canyon.	Garden House in 2013	
German House	The French, German, Russian and Spanish Houses, known collectively as the Woodstock Language Houses, were designed by A. E. Doyle and built in 1922. Once used for faculty residence, a select group of German-speaking students (aided by live-in scholars and native speakers) now live in the German House. Residents primarily converse in German and sponsor community events, such as the annual Oktoberfest celebrations. Just southwest of the German House is a Black Oak that has been designated as a heritage tree.	German House in 2013 German House in 2012	
Griffin Hall	Part of the Cross Canyon Residence Halls, along with Bragdon, Chittick, McKinley and Woodbridge Halls, Griffin is named after an early faculty member and serves to house 28 students, mostly during their first year. Griffin includes a kitchen, laundry room, and a three-level social room with a fireplace, plus a third-floor balcony with views of the Reed Canyon. Like the rest of Reed's housing, Griffin hall is coed and offers singles, divided and undivided doubles, and divided triples.	Griffin Hall in 2013	
Gray Campus Center (GCC)	Located opposite the Old Dorm Block, the GCC was designed in 1965 by renowned modernist architect Harry Weese, who additionally contributed two other buildings and a master plan for the campus. It was known as the Community Center until its remodelling in 1998, when it was renamed after trustees and influential donors John and Betty Gray. Currently, the building houses Commons, the on-campus dining hall catered by Bon Appetit, in addition to several conference rooms, a student darkroom, the MLLL comic book library, the Pool Hall and other student spaces.	Gray Campus Center in 2007	
Greywood	Originally built for a community center in Vancouver, Washington, Greywood was moved to Reed College in 1946. Greywood received its name following a naming competition. Historically, the building has housed classrooms, the community safety office, computing and information services, the development office, faculty offices, and even an art gallery and lounge. Greywood currently houses the alumni and parent relations program, College Relations Information Systems (CRIS), and career services. Adjacent to the building are Giant Sequoias and Pacific Madronas.	Greywood in 2012	
Health and Counseling Center	Built in 1938 as the Glenn Chesney Quiett Infirmary, primarily with contributions made in honor of Quiett, an alumnus who served in World War I. The building was renovated in 1960, doubling its size. Today the Health and Counseling Center offers health and counseling services to students.	Health and Counseling Center in 2013	
Kaul Auditorium			
L.E. Griffin Memorial Biology Building	The L.E. Griffin Memorial Biology Building is named after Lawrence Edmonds Griffin, who served as biology professor and head of the department from 1920 to 1945.	L.E. Griffin Memorial Biology Building in 2013	
MacNaughton	MacNaughton was built during 1954–1955 and originally served as a residence hall for female students. Named after former Reed College president Ernest B. MacNaughton, the building is now a coed dormitory with divided double rooms.	MacNaughton in 2013	
McKinley Hall	Part of the Cross Canyon Residence Halls, along with Bragdon, Chittick, Griffin and Woodbridge Halls, McKinley is named after an early faculty member and serves to house 28 students, mostly during their first year. McKinley includes a kitchen, laundry room, and a three-level social room with a fireplace, plus a third-floor balcony with views of Reed Canyon. The hall is coed by alternate rooms and offers singles, divided and undivided doubles, and divided triples.	McKinley Hall in 2013	
Naito Hall	Naito Hall and Sullivan Hall, built in 1997, house 160 residents and offer common areas, kitchens and views of the Tualatin Mountains. Naito Hall, known as Steele Hall until 2007, is named for Bill Naito, a Portland businessman who graduated from Reed and later served on its board of trustees.	Naito Hall in 2012	
Old Dorm Block	Constructed in 1912 and renovated in 1992, the Old Dorm Block was inspired by old English manor houses and features grotesques on its exterior. The building's eight residence halls were once identified by the letters "A" through "H", but were renamed in 1935 as Abington, Doyle, Eastport, Kerr, Ladd, Quincy, Westport and Winch. The building also features a sun dial, sally port, and statues of beavers in honor of Oregon, and formerly held the Doyle owl statue.	Old Dorm Block in 2007	
Parker House	Reed College purchased the Parker House in 2005. The Arts and Crafts-style home was designed by Morris H. Whitehouse in 1929 for Mary Evans Parker. Much of the home's gardens, designed by Florence Holmes Gerke and which once extended to the Eastmoreland Golf Course, still exist.	Parker House in 2013	
Performing Arts Building	This building was constructed in 2013 for a cost of $28 million USD. The structure servers dance, theatre, and music.	Performing Arts Building in 2013	
Physical Plant		Physical Plant in 2013	
Prexy		Prexy in 2013	
Psychology Building		Psychology Building in 2013	
Reed College Apartments	Acquired in 1986, the Reed College Apartments are available for students following their first year. Apartments are fully furnished, with kitchens, living rooms, and the option of one or two bedrooms.	Reed College Apartments in 2013	
Russian House	The French, German, Russian and Spanish Houses, known collectively as the Woodstock Language Houses, were designed by A. E. Doyle and built in 1922. Once used for faculty residence, Russian-speaking students (aided by live-in scholars and native speakers) now reside in the Russian House. Residents primarily converse in Russian and sponsor community events.	Russian House in 2013	
Scholz	The Scholz and Foster buildings, built during 1954–1955, were once a single residence hall for male students called Foster-Scholz. Scholz, named after former Reed College president Richard F. Scholz, currently serves as a coed dormitory with divided double rooms.	Scholz in 2012	
Sequoia House		Sequoia House in 2012	
Sitka House		Sitka House in 2012	
Spanish House	The French, German, Russian and Spanish Houses, known collectively as the Woodstock Language Houses, were designed by A. E. Doyle and built in 1922. Once used for faculty residence, Spanish-speaking students (aided by live-in scholars and native speakers) now reside in the Spanish House. Residents primarily converse in Spanish and sponsor community events.	Spanish House in 2012	
Student Center		Student Center in 2013	
Student Union		Student Union in 2013	
Studio Art Building		Studio Art Building in 2013	
Sullivan Hall	Sullivan Hall and Naito Hall, built in 1997, house 160 residents and offer common areas, kitchens and views of the Tualatin Mountains.	Sullivan Hall in 2012	
Theatre		Theatre in 2012	
Theatre Annex / Reed Warehouse	Acquired in 1989 and remodeled in 1996, the Theatre Annex Building includes main stage and black box theaters, plus two additional rooms for instruction and rehearsals. The remainder of the building, sometimes called Reed Warehouse, is used for set construction, design and storage.	Theatre Annex in 2013	
Vollum College Center		Vollum College Center in 2012	
Woodbridge Hall	Part of the Cross Canyon Residence Halls, along with Bragdon, Chittick, Griffin and McKinley Halls, Woodbridge is named after an early faculty member and serves to house 28 students, mostly during their first year. Woodbridge includes a kitchen, laundry room, and a three-level social room with a fireplace, plus a third-floor balcony with views of Reed Canyon. The hall is coed by alternate rooms and offers singles, divided and undivided doubles, and divided triples.	Woodbridge Hall in 2013	

Source: Reed College

== See also ==
- List of Marylhurst University buildings
- List of Portland State University buildings
- List of University of Oregon buildings
- List of University of Portland buildings
- List of Willamette University buildings
