= Robert and Suzanne Drucker House =

Historic house in Illinois, United States

- U.S. National Register of Historic Places
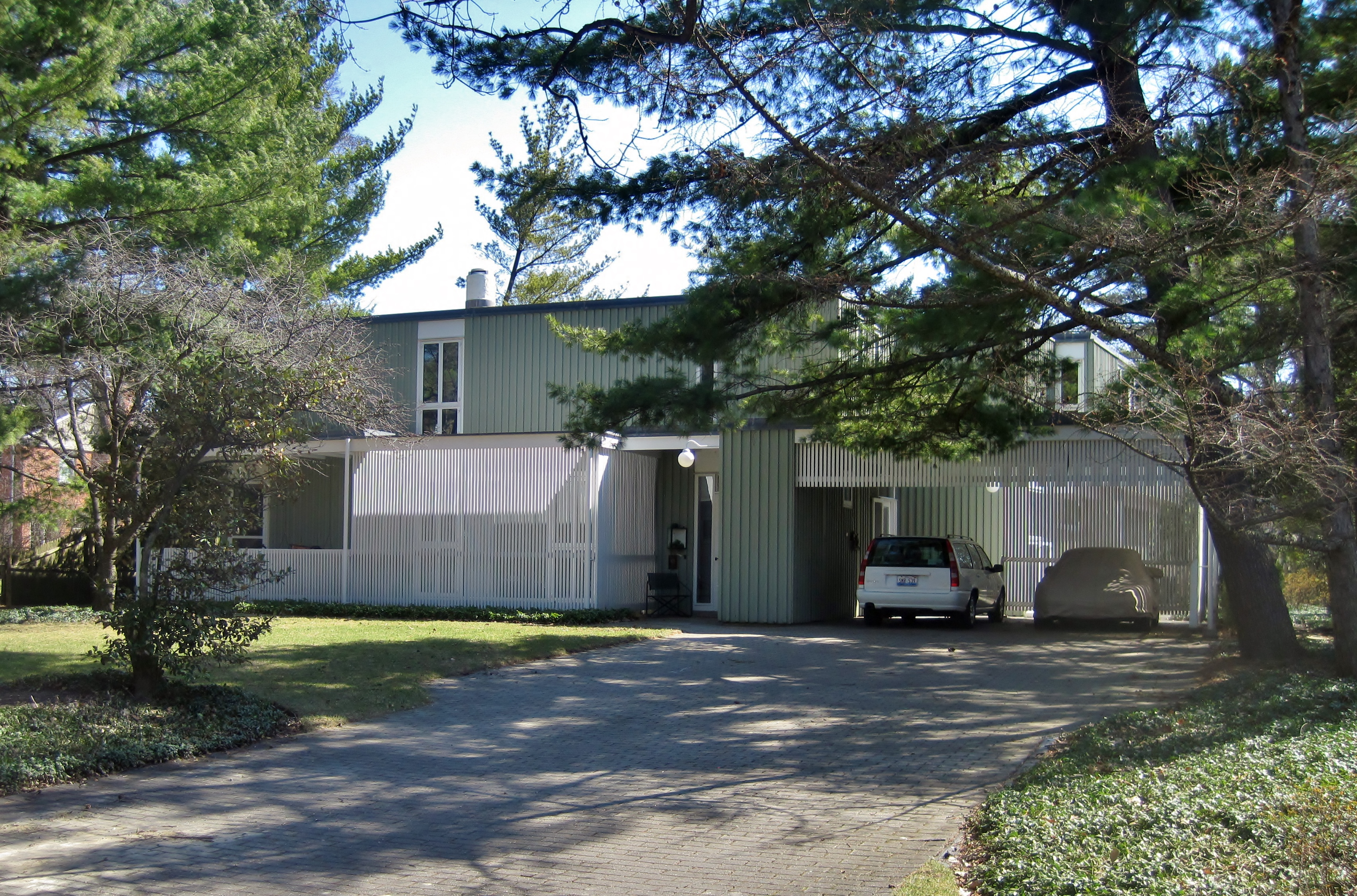

- Location within Illinois Location within the United States
- Nearest city: Wilmette, Illinois
- Coordinates: 42°4′54″N 87°44′41″W
- Built: 1954
- Architect: Harry Weese, Ben Weese (1963 addition)
- Architectural style: International Style
- NRHP reference No.: 13000715
- Added to NRHP: September 18, 2013

The Robert and Suzanne Drucker House is an architecturally significant house in Wilmette, Illinois, United States. It was designed by architect Harry Weese for his sister Sue Drucker and her husband Robert. Brother Ben Weese designed an addition in 1963.

== History ==
Sue (née Weese) Drucker was the younger sister of architect Harry Weese. In 1952, she and her husband Robert Drucker were living with their three children in an Evanston, Illinois apartment when they decided that they wanted to have a house. Her brother Harry Weese was an architect who started his own practice in 1947 following World War II. They chose to stay in the vicinity, selecting a site in nearby Wilmette, Illinois by her mother. Construction took much longer than expected, as Harry had to fire his contractor halfway through the project. The house was completed in 1954.

Because Harry Weese was close with his family, he had a good idea of what Sue was looking for in a home. He designed the house to have many windows on the south so that it would always be filled with sunlight during the day. Although it is generally an open floor plan, rooms could also be closed off with accordion doors for privacy. In lieu of a garage—which Harry saw only as a storage building—Weese designed a carport with storage cabinets. In 1963, Harry and Sue's brother Ben Weese designed a second-floor wing with three bedrooms. Sue resided in the house until her death at the age of 100 in November 2023.

== Architecture ==
The Robert and Suzanne Drucker House is in the Indian Hills Subdivision of Wilmette. It is on the south side of Iroquois Street halfway between Illinois Road to the east and Hibbard Road to the west. The house stands out on its block, which is otherwise filled with standard historical revival homes. It is situated on a deep rectangular 0.5-acre (0.20 ha) lot with a fenced rear yard. The house sits 85 feet (26 m) back from Iroquois Street. The two-story house is generally L-shaped with its long portion parallel to Iroquois and its wing extension on the west. Typical of the International Style, the house lacks excess ornamentation. Roofs are flat, covered with tar and gravel, and edged with aluminum. Exterior walls are painted vertical board-and-batten cedar siting. Doors and windows have painted metal frames. The carport, porches, and terrace have wood privacy walls.

The main section of the house measures 40 by 18 feet (12.2 m × 5.5 m). Originally one story, the Druckers commissioned a second-story addition to the main section in 1963. The rear wing is irregular, measuring 45 feet (14 m) on the west, 18 feet (5.5 m) on the south, 35 feet (11 m) on the east and 9 feet (2.7 m) on the north. The front porch and terrace, extending 10 feet (3.0 m) from the house, stretch 30 feet (9.1 m) along the front of the house. To the west of the porch and terrace is the 18-by-20-foot (5.5 m × 6.1 m) carport. The rear of the house features a 15-by-10-foot (4.6 m × 3.0 m) screened-in porch with a flat roof and a simple wooden cornice. A small terrace fits between the porch and the western wing of the house.

== See also ==
- National Register of Historic Places listings in Cook County, Illinois
