= Seventeenth Church of Christ, Scientist =

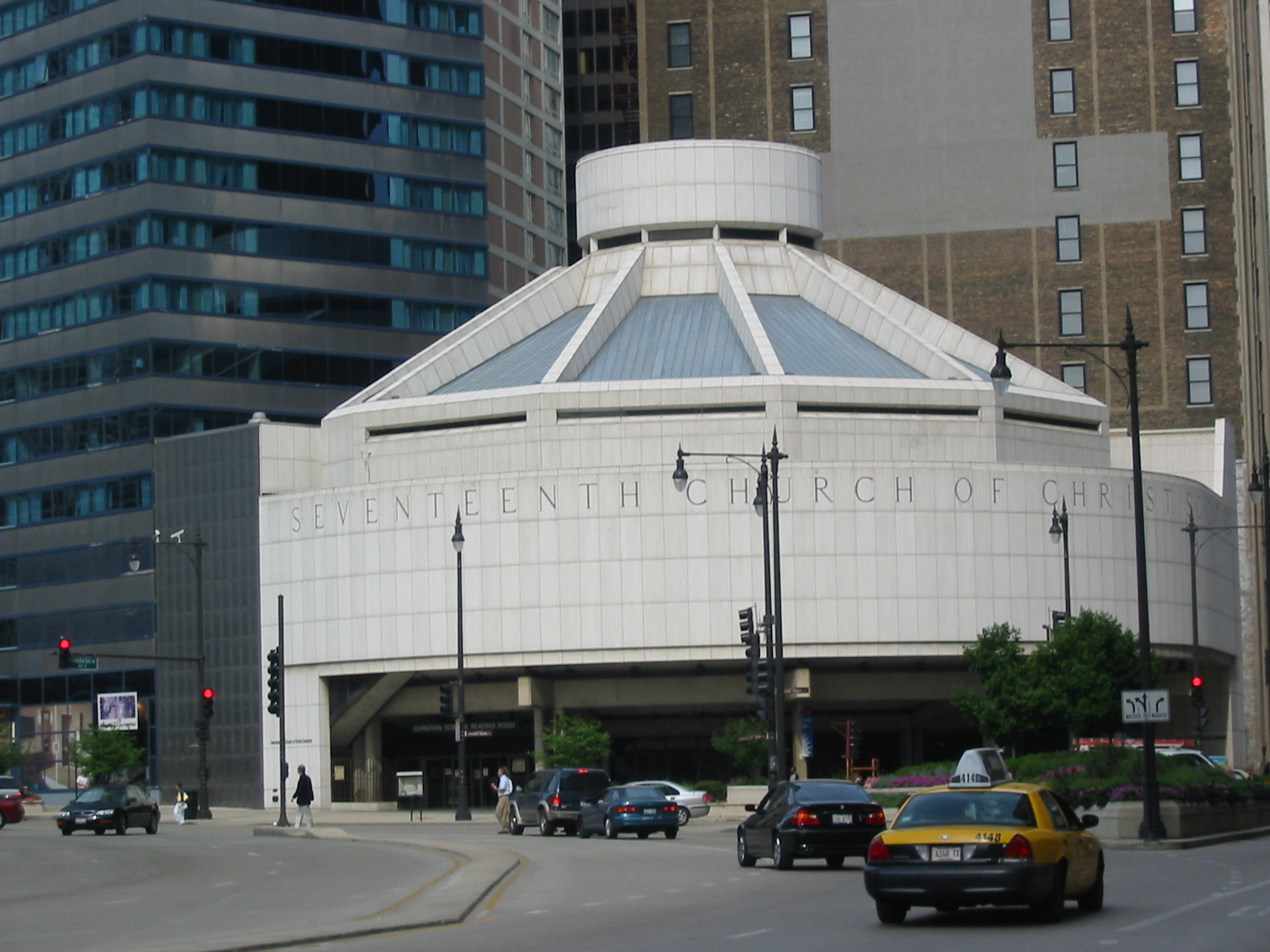
- Seventeenth Church of Christ, Scientist
- 41.887065°N 87.625876°W
- Location: Chicago, Illinois
- Country: United States
- Denomination: Christian Science

Architecture
- Architect: Harry Weese
- Architectural type: Modern
- Completed: 1968

Specifications
- Capacity: 764

Seventeenth Church of Christ, Scientist, built in 1968, is a modern style Christian Science church building located in The Loop at 55 East Wacker Drive, (at Wabash Avenue) in Chicago, Illinois in the United States. It was designed by noted Chicago-based architect Harry Weese, whose most famous work is the Washington Metro but who is remembered best as the architect who "shaped Chicago’s skyline and the way the city thought about everything from the lakefront to its treasure-trove of historical buildings."

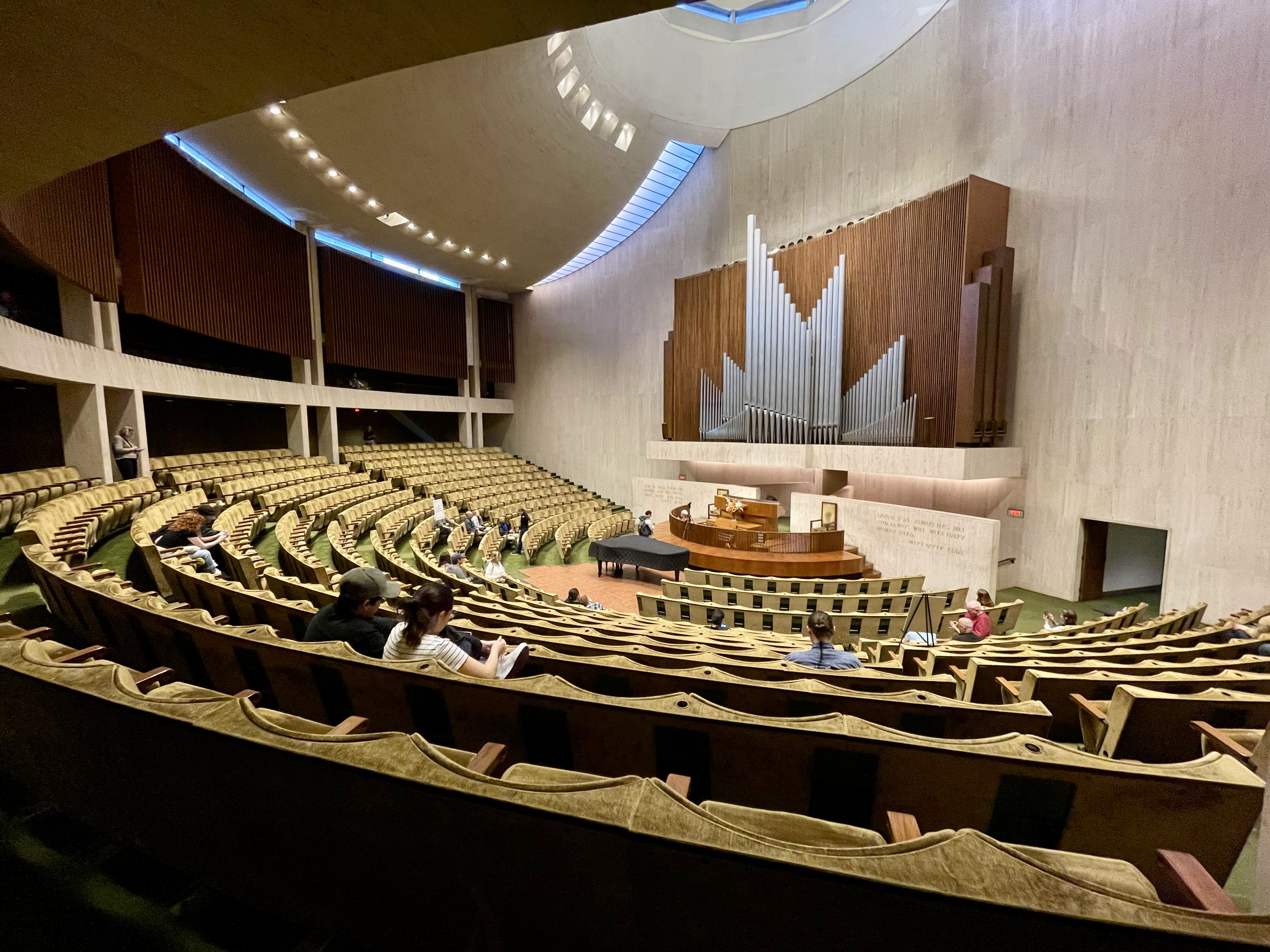
The semicircular, two-tiered sanctuary of the church.

Built by Sumner Sollitt Construction Company of concrete in a circular design, the building has no traditional windows in the interior amphitheater. Outside light comes through a skylight at the top of the oculus in the center of the conical roof. Pedestrian entrance to the building is via a bridge over a sunken garden, which Weese said "was for the benefit of the [subterranean] Sunday School, which didn't have any traditional windows" but is lit through the garden by the light from the street level above. The semicircular auditorium which seats 764 is designed so that no seat is more than 54 feet from the Readers' Platform, which is the focal point of all Christian Science church auditoriums. An invisible sound reinforcement system with 350 hidden microphones allows those in attendance at the Wednesday evening testimonial meetings to give testimonies without having to leave their seats. Off street parking is provided by a subterranean parking garage. A feature of the lower lobby is an acrylic painting on canvas entitled "Millenium Garden: Psalm 23,” completed by Chicago artist Anne Farley Gaines in 2001. In 1996, Seventeenth Church received the 25 Year Award of the Chicago Chapter of the American Institute of Architects. In celebration of the 2018 Illinois Bicentennial, the Seventeenth Church of Christ, Scientist was selected as one of the Illinois 200 Great Places by the American Institute of Architects Illinois component (AIA Illinois).

== In film and television ==
The church's exterior was shown in the 2011 film Transformers: Dark of the Moon and the 2021 film Candyman.

The church's interior amphitheater was the set for the Choosing Ceremony scene in the 2014 film Divergent.
