= Charles N. Ramsey and Harry E. Weese House =

Historic house in Illinois, United States

- Ramsey, Charles N., and Herry E. Weese House
- U.S. National Register of Historic Places
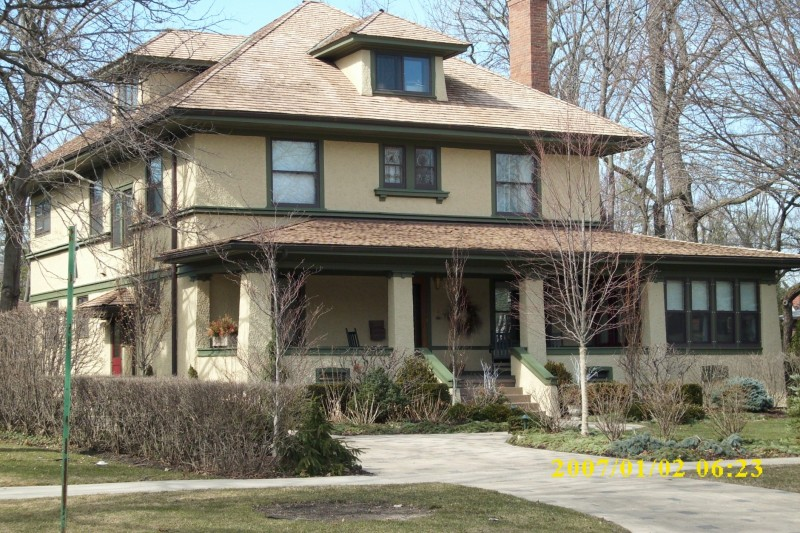
- Weese House in 2012

- Location within Illinois Location within the United States
- Location: 141 Kenilworth Ave., Kenilworth, Illinois
- Coordinates: 42°5′30″N 87°42′39″W
- Area: 0.4 acres (0.16 ha)
- Built: 1908
- Architectural style: American Craftsman Bungalow, American Foursquare
- NRHP reference No.: 09000167
- Added to NRHP: April 1, 2009

The Charles N. Ramsey and Harry E. Weese House is a historic residence in Kenilworth, Illinois. Considered an excellent local example of an American Foursquare design, it is also the childhood home of architect Harry M. Weese.

== History ==
Charles Nance and Katherine A. Ramsey purchased the Kenilworth, Illinois property in January 1909. It is believed that the house already stood, recently constructed, at this point. Charles was a Sales Manager with the Industry of Window/Glass in nearby Evanston. In 1912, the Ramsays sold the house; however, it appears that they continued to live there for at least two more years. In 1919, the property was sold to Harry Ernest and Marjorie (Mohr) Weese.

Harry E. Weese had been born in Bull Creek, Indiana in 1876. In the 1890s, he found work with the United States Railway Mail Service, operating routes between Toledo and St. Louis. Weese moved to the Chicago North Shore area in 1902 when he enrolled at Northwestern University. He joined N. W. Harris & Co., later known as the Harris Trust & Savings Bank, as a General Bookkeeper and Auditor in 1903. He worked at Harris until his retirement in 1942, holding the rank of Treasurer since 1927. Harry Weese was elected Village Clerk of Kenilworth in 1922, serving until he was elected as village Treasurer in 1925. He held this latter position until his 1942 relocation to Barrington. Weese greatly struggled through the Great Depression; he himself became depressed because of all of the workers he was forced to lay off.

Weese married Marjorie Moore in September 1914. They rented apartments in Evanston until they purchased this house. Both Harry and Marjorie were involved with the activities and operations of the Kenilworth Club. Harry Weese died in 1956 in Fort Lauderdale, Florida.

The couple's eldest son, Harry Mohr Weese, was born in 1915 while they lived in Evanston. Weese was enrolled in the progressive Joseph Sears School in 1919. By age ten, Weese had determined that he wanted to be an artist or architect. Weese moved out in 1933 when he enrolled at the Massachusetts Institute of Technology to pursue a Bachelor in Architecture. Weese's father provided him with his first commission, for a lake cottage on a family property. Weese would go on to become one of the most prominent architects of the modern movement. On April 1, 2009, the house was recognized by the National Park Service with a listing on the National Register of Historic Places.
