= St Thomas' Episcopal Church (Menasha, Wisconsin) =

Coordinates: 44°11′39.3″N 88°27′18.0″W

St. Thomas' Episcopal Church is a congregation of the Episcopal Diocese of Wisconsin, located in Menasha, Wisconsin. It is part of the Lake Winnebago Deanery. It was formerly part of the Episcopal Diocese of Fond du Lac.

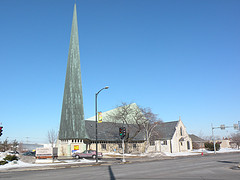
St. Thomas from the southeast.

The church's 1963 building was designed by Harry Weese.

In 2019, the church reported 853 members; in 2023, it reported 668 members. No membership statistics were reported in 2024 national parochial reports. Plate and pledge financial support reported by the church in 2024 was $471,858. Average Sunday Attendance ASA reported in 2024 was 86 persons. This was a relative decrease on ASA of 189 in 2015.

== History ==
The congregation began in 1853 with services held in the Menasha area. In 1859, St. Stephen's was organized. In 1866, the roots of a new congregation were planted and in 1868, Trinity Church was organized in Neenah.

Over the next 50 years, these congregations in the "Twin Cities" were usually served by the same priest. Often when one congregation was healthy and vital, the other would struggle. This position reversed many times over five decades. In early 1914 discussion about uniting these two congregations into one began in earnest.

On Christmas Day, 1914, the first union service was held and on Easter Day, 1915 a new congregation was formally established. Junior Warden Harry Price, who had worshipped in St. Thomas Church Fifth Avenue, New York, persuaded the Vestry to name the new congregation after it because of its beauty. St. Thomas was formally incorporated on September 8, 1915.

Over the next century years, the congregation experienced growth in membership, programs and property. A new church building was occupied in 1916. Boy Scout Troop 3 was founded in 1922. Stained glass windows were installed in the 1930s. By the 1940s, baptized membership exceeded 500 from over 200 families. A new Parish Hall replaced the Parish House and Gymnasium in the 1950s.

The 1970s saw development of strong lay leadership in the congregation and community. The 1980s experienced personal and corporate spiritual renewal and a strong healing ministry. The 1990s and 2000s saw development of team ministries and outreach programs.

== Architecture ==
In 1961, fire destroyed the west 1/3 of the church building. By 1963, a new 'addition' by Chicago architect Harry Weese was dedicated which integrated the old sanctuary and nave as a chapel to a modern sanctuary and nave of concrete, wood and copper. it is regarded as among Weese's most "noteworthy" buildings. Architecture critic Ian Baldwin calls St. Thomas Episcopal, an example of "Weese’s most poetic work," writing that "It seems to match the best work of Marcel Breuer, who at the same time was also building spare, dramatic Béton brut churches in the upper Midwest."

== Ministries ==
Formation and children's ministries have always been a vital part of the congregation. Double Portion, a feeding program, is a part of St. Thomas serving 100 guests a lunch each week. There is also a food pantry.

== Clergy ==
The current Interim Rector is Fr. Andy C. Lilegard, who has served as rector since 2024.

Rectors:

1. Hebert A. Wilson 1915–1917
2. William G. Studwell 1917–1920
3. Raymond A. Heron 1920–1925
4. Gordon A. Fowles 1926–1932
5. Malcom VanZandt 1932–1936
6. Leonard Mitchell (Interim) 1936
7. Albert A. Chambers [became Bishop of Springfield] 1936–1942
8. Herman A. Berngen 1942–1944
9. Crawford W. Brown (Interim) 1944
10. John Bartel Reinheimer 1945–1955
11. Thomas K. Chafee 1956–1975
12. William Johnston 1976–1997
13. Ian Montgomery 1997–2009
14. Ed Smith (Interim) 2009–2010
15. Ralph Oshborne 2010–2023
16. Chris Arnold (Interim) 2023-2024
17. Andy Cruz Lilegard 2024-

== Sources ==
Curtiss, A. Parker (1925). History of the Diocese of Fond du Lac and Its Several Congregations. Fond du Lac, Wisconsin: P.B. Haber Printing. "Compiled Under The Direction of The Bishop, in Commemoration of its FIFTIETH ANNIVERSARY"

Church Committee, St. Thomas (1940). History of St. Thomas Episcopal Church, Neenah-Menasha, Wisconsin: 1915-1940 (PDF). Neenah, Wisconsin.
