= 227 East Walton Place Apartment Building =

Condominium building in Chicago, Illinois

- Interactive map of the 227 East Walton Place; Apartment Building area

General information
- Status: Completed
- Type: Apartment Building
- Architectural style: Chicago School
- Location: 227 E. Walton Place, Chicago, Illinois, United States
- Coordinates: 41°54′0.2″N 87°37′14.7″W
- Year built: 1956

Technical details
- Floor count: 13

Design and construction
- Architect: Harry Weese
- Main contractor: A. L. Jackson Company

Chicago Landmark
- Designated: June 6, 2012

The 227 East Walton Place Apartment Building is a historic apartment building located in the Near North Side community area of Chicago, Illinois, United States.

Designed by Chicago architect Harry Weese and constructed in 1956, the building is situated two blocks east of Chicago's fashionable Magnificent Mile and one block west of DuSable Lake Shore Drive in the Streeterville neighborhood.

It was designated as a Chicago Landmark on December 8, 2004.

== Architecture ==
In the context of high-rise architecture in 1950s Chicago, the design of 227 East Walton Place stood out as highly innovative and unconventional. At the time, Ludwig Mies van der Rohe and his followers were championing the International Style and modernism. Weese deviated from the trend and opted to honor the past, as evidenced by many design elements, including the use of the humble red brick of the city's vernacular buildings and the building's stacked projecting window bays, a design element derived from late-nineteenth century Chicago School buildings and paying homage to Chicago's architectural history.

As such, the building embodies Weese's strong interest in creating more humane modern architecture that would reflect historic architectural traditions and local urban context – an approach that set him apart from the American architectural mainstream of the 1950s.

== Description ==
Roughly square in plan, the thirteen-story, 24-unit apartment building measures 50' (15 m) across its front elevation on Walton Place. On the first floor's east side, there is a compact lobby that features floor-to-ceiling windows and modernist exterior door hardware that is visually distinctive.

Above the first floor, the walls are clad in vertical bands of visually-warm red brick alternating with vertical bands of stacked window openings, giving the building a striped appearance. The unornamented flat planes of brick are relieved by the three-sided, projecting bay windows arranged in two vertical stacks, giving the front façade an undulating quality while providing improved lighting and ventilation.

Each floor contains only two apartments which are accessed by a small, semi-private elevator lobby, reflecting Weese's distaste for long corridors in apartment buildings.

== Historical context ==
227 East Walton Place was constructed in 1956, at a time when the suburbs were luring people away from Chicago's urban center. Weese and others believed that well-designed buildings could keep residents in the city by offering easy access to the city's cultural and recreational pursuits, in addition to proximity to the workplace. During the 1950s and 1960s, they rapidly developed lakefront neighborhoods such as Streeterville, where the building is located.

For 41-year-old Harry Weese, 227 East Walton Place was an important commission that accelerated his career, which up to that point had consisted mostly of designing suburban houses.

After the Walton Place building was completed, it was immediately recognized as an exceptional architectural project. Architectural historian Carl Condit highlighted the design in Chicago, 1930-1960, and the design was featured in numerous architectural journals, as well as being referenced in articles about Harry Weese throughout his career.

== Development and construction ==
While it was then generally discouraged by the architectural profession for one person to act as both designer and speculative developer of a building, Harry Weese took on both roles for this project, partnering with John Baird, who was then a vice president at the real estate brokerage firm of Baird & Warner, to develop the building.

Harry Weese and Baird & Warner initially marketed the building as cooperative apartments, but they were unable to sell them, and the building instead operated as a rental property for several years. In the mid-1960s, Weese and John Baird sold the building, and it was eventually converted into condominiums in 1969, a status it has maintained until today.
