= Oak Park Village Hall =

- U.S. National Register of Historic Places
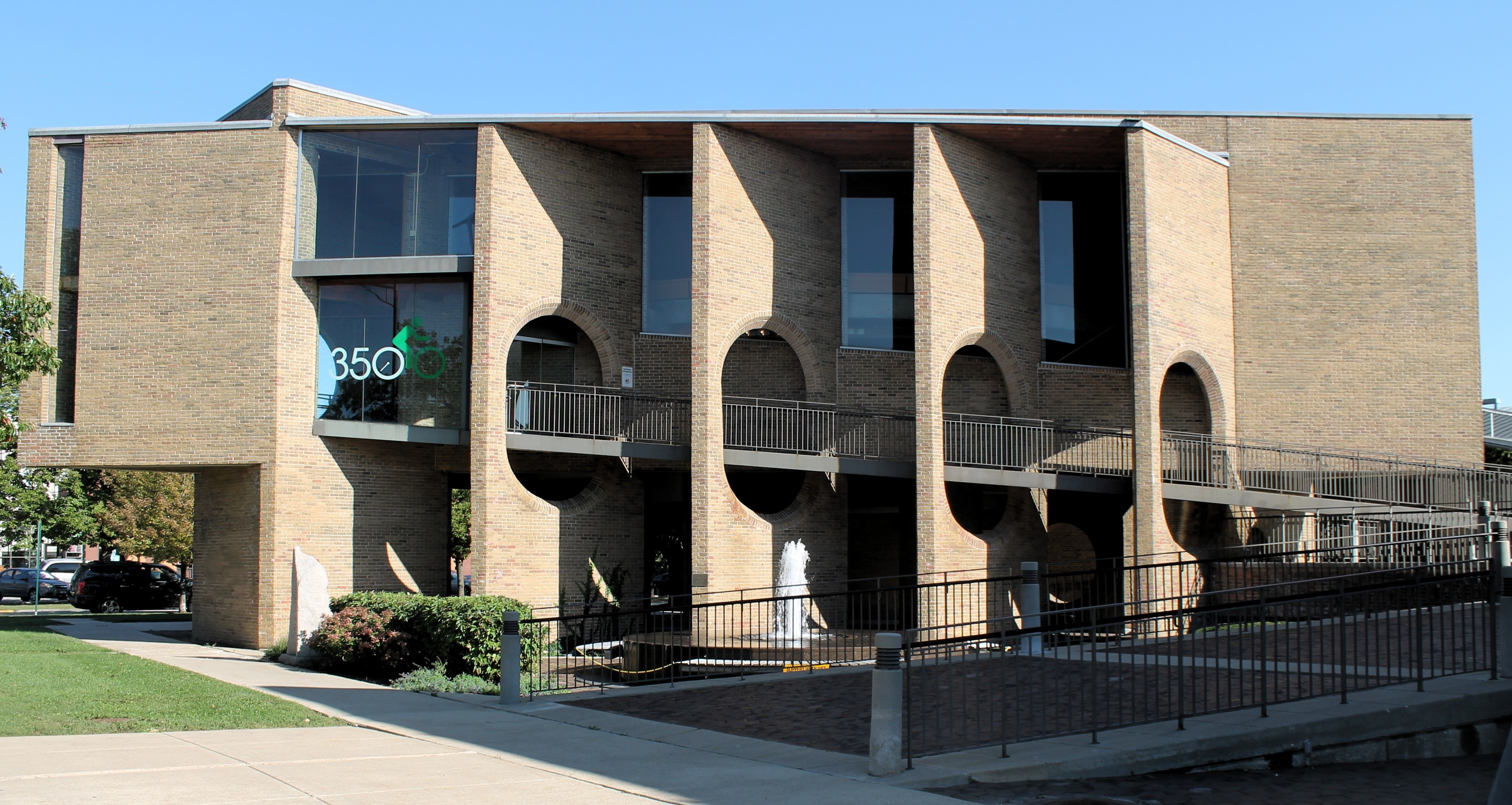

- Location within Chicago metropolitan area Location within Illinois Location within the United States
- Location: 123 Madison St., Oak Park, Illinois
- Coordinates: 41°52′46″N 87°46′44″W
- Built: 1975
- Architect: Harry Weese
- Architectural style: Modern Movement
- NRHP reference No.: 14000505
- Added to NRHP: August 25, 2014

The Oak Park Village Hall at 123 Madison Street is the center of village government in Oak Park, Illinois. The village hall was built in 1975 as part of a series of public infrastructure improvements intended to prevent white flight from the village. In the late 1960s, as more black residents moved to the east side of Oak Park, preexisting white residents began deinvesting in the neighborhood and moving away. The village responded by investing heavily in the east side and adopting housing policies which discouraged blockbusting and resegregation, ultimately causing the village to become diverse and integrated. The new village hall was a key piece of this plan, as it brought a landmark building to a vulnerable section of the east side. Harry Weese, a nationally prominent Chicago architect, designed the Modernist building. The building's design includes a brick exterior with a ribbon window along the roof line, an enclosed central courtyard, and a triangular council chamber section with a long front ramp threaded through several brick pylons.

The building was added to the National Register of Historic Places on August 25, 2014.
