= Studio Art Building =

Building at Reed College, Portland, Oregon, U.S.

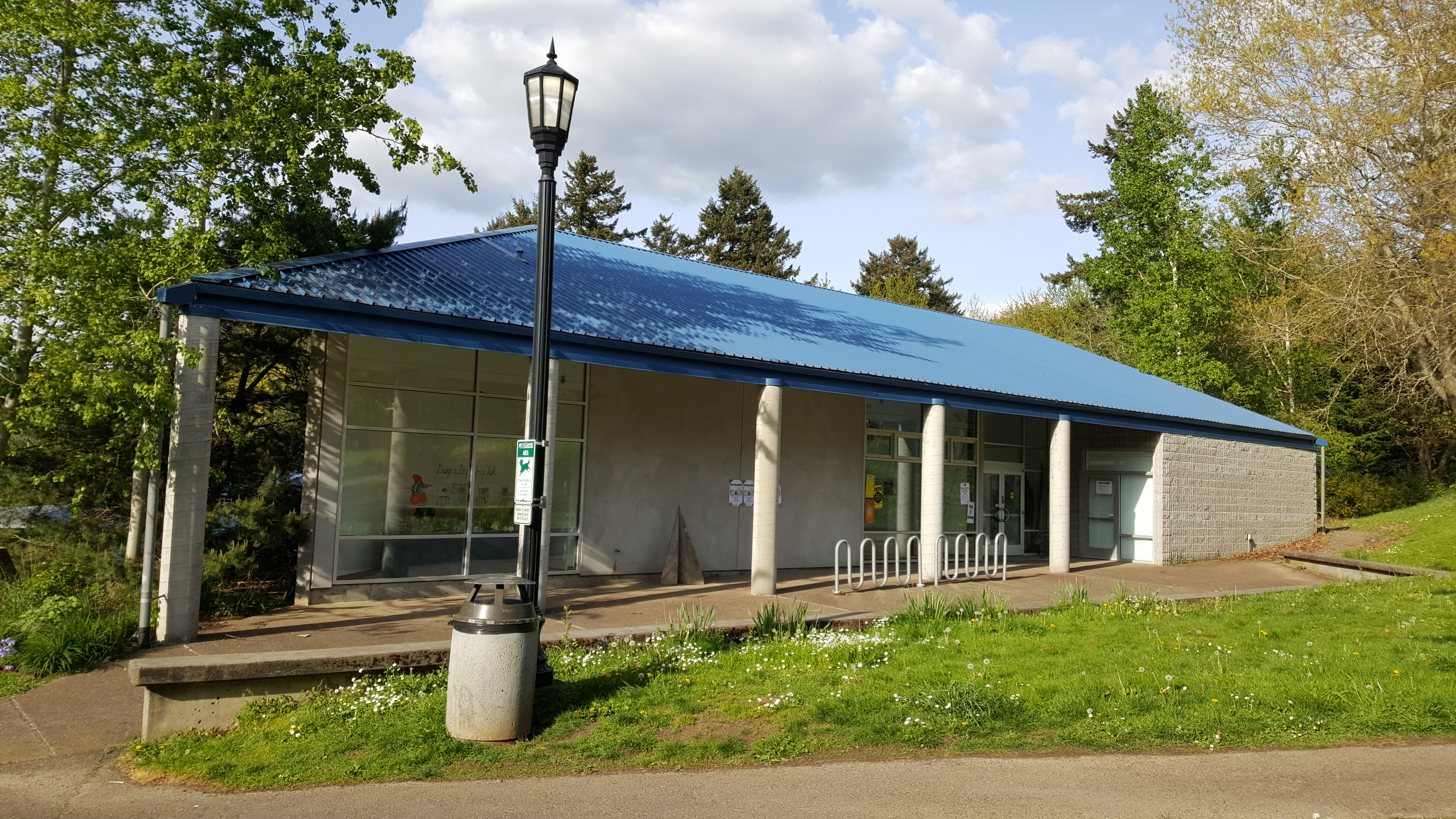
- The building's exterior in 2016

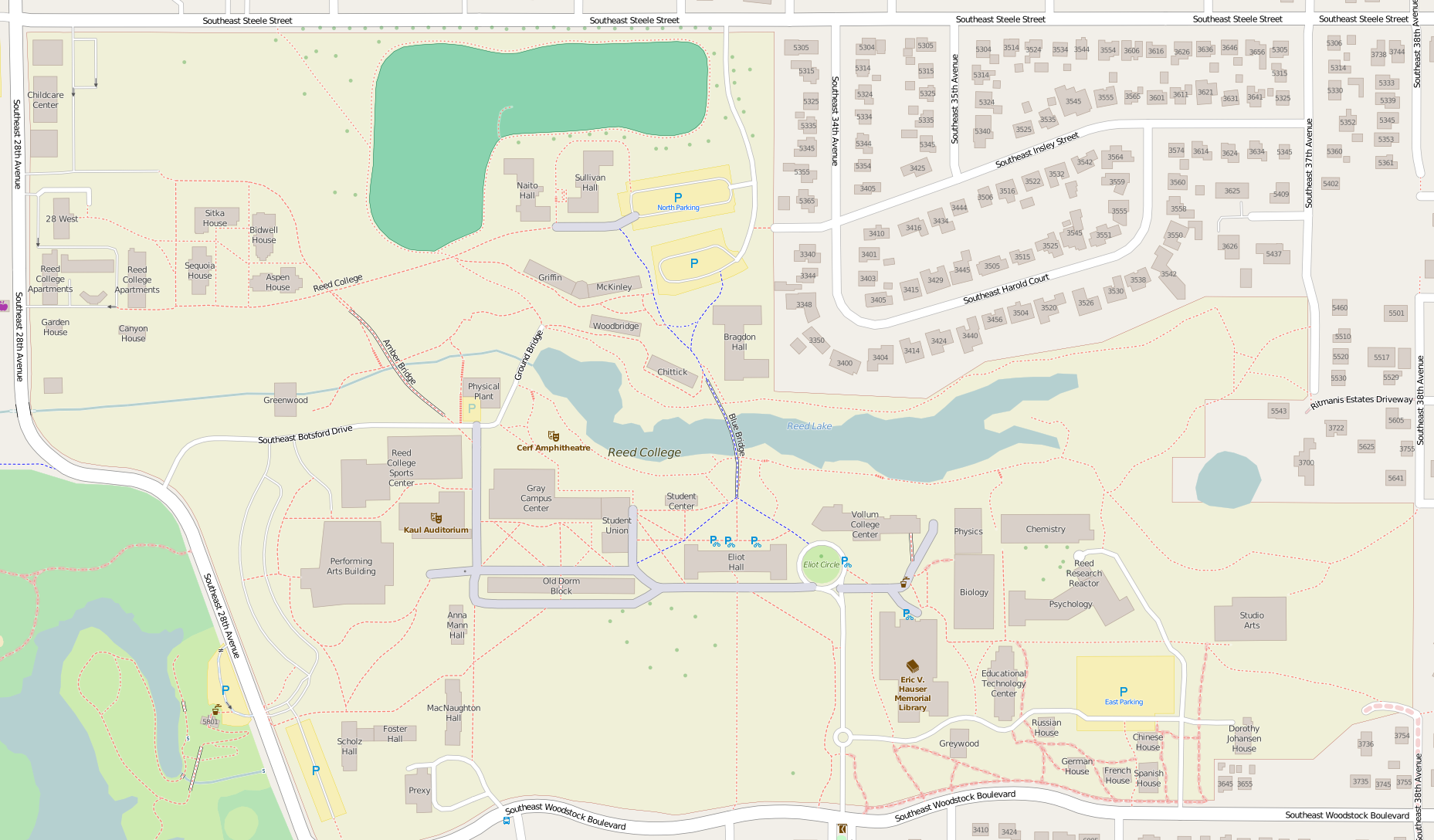
- Location within Reed College Portland OR

General information
- Location: Reed College, Portland, Oregon, United States
- Coordinates: 45.48062°N 122.62535°W
- Completed: 1980
- Renovated: 2001

The Studio Art Building is a building on the Reed College campus in Portland, Oregon, in the United States. Its lower level was built in 1980, and renovations in 2001 increased the building's size by 4,800 square feet.

== See also ==
- List of Reed College buildings
