= First Baptist Church (Columbus, Indiana) =

Historic church in Indiana, United States

- U.S. National Register of Historic Places
- U.S. National Historic Landmark
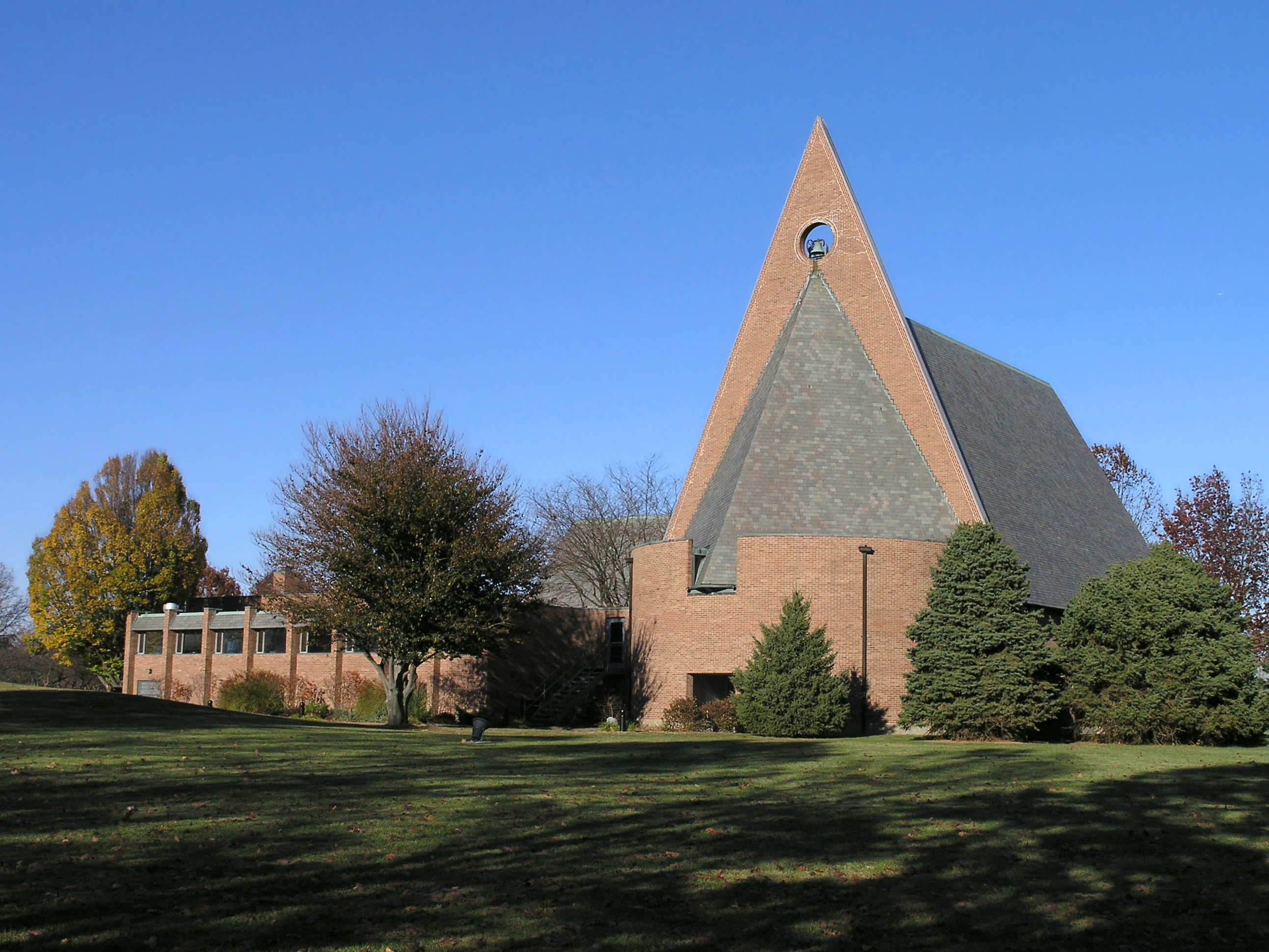
- First Baptist Church, Columbus, Indiana

- Location within Bartholomew County, Indiana Location within Indiana Location within the United States
- Location: 3300 Fairlawn Dr., Columbus, Indiana
- Coordinates: 39°14′1″N 85°52′20″W
- Architect: Harry Weese
- Architectural style: Modern
- MPS: Modernism in Architecture, Landscape Architecture, Design, and Art in Bartholomew County, 1942-1965 MPS
- NRHP reference No.: 00000707

Significant dates
- Added to NRHP: May 16, 2000
- Designated NHL: May 16, 2000

The First Baptist Church is one of seven National Historic Landmarks in Columbus, Indiana, United States. It was designed by distinguished architect Harry Weese and completed in 1965. Since completion, few alterations have been made and the building has retained its integrity. It was one of the first church designs to integrate Modern movement architecture and a non-traditional church plan.

== Location ==
The First Baptist Church of Columbus is located at 3300 Fairlawn Drive in Columbus, Indiana. It occupies one-third of an open area in a suburban neighborhood of single-family homes developed in the 1960s and 1970s. Richards Elementary School (designed by Edward Larrabee Barnes and built in 1965) and Par 3 Golf Course and Clubhouse (designed by Bruce Adams and built in 1972) comprise the other two-thirds of the "town square". These structures are easily visible as they create the skyline of this residential subdivision.

== Description ==
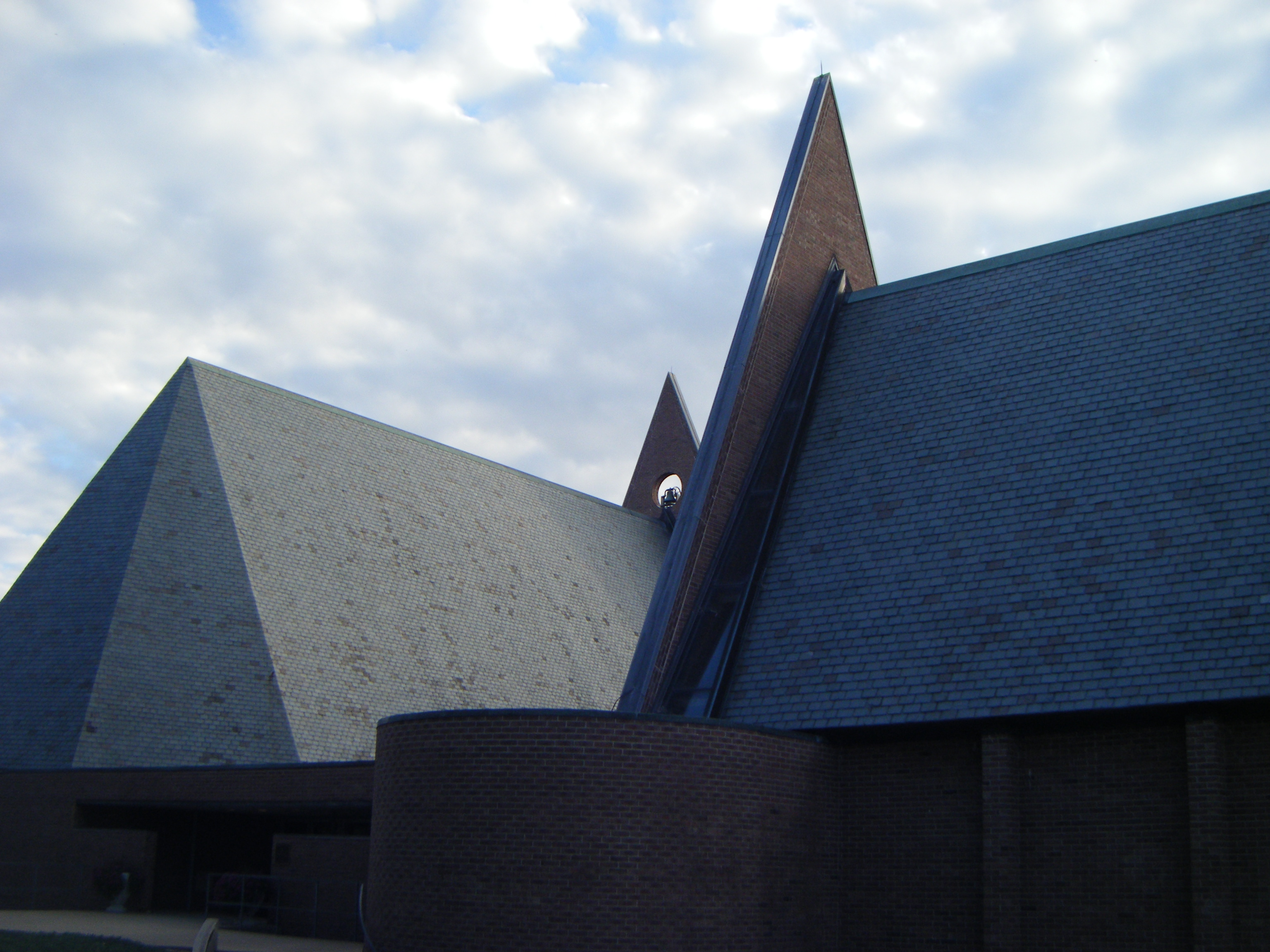
First Baptist Church

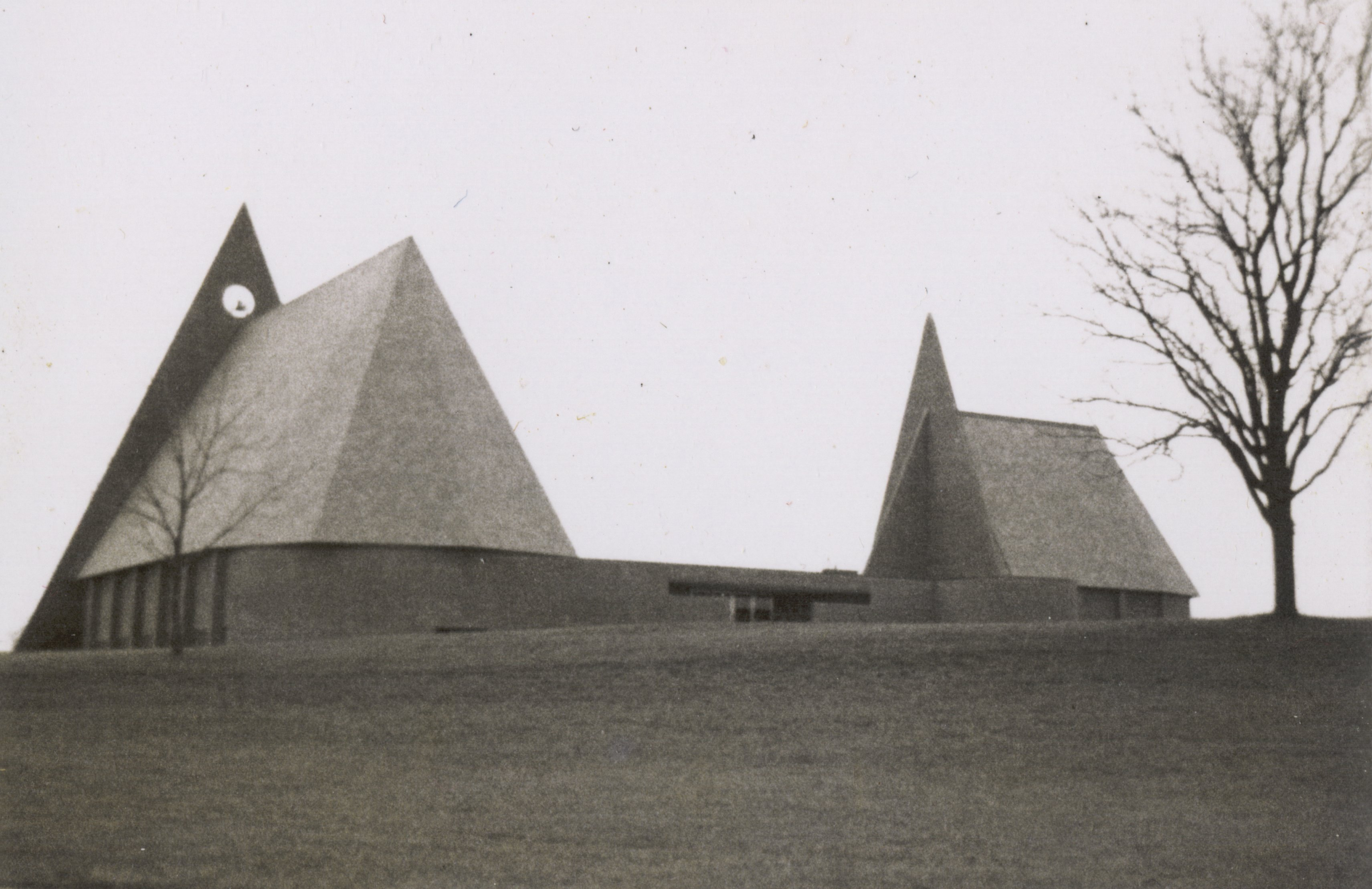
First Baptist Church in the mid-1960s

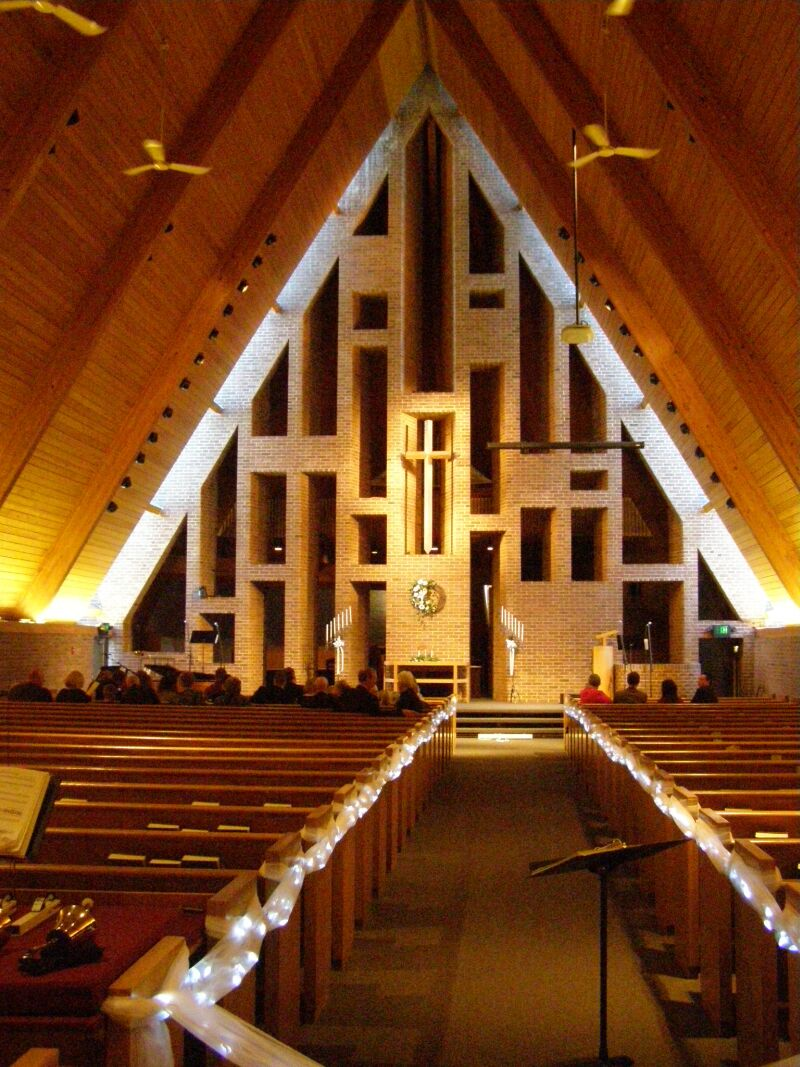
Sanctuary

The First Baptist Church was one of Columbus's early congregations. It occupied a previous site (which has not been preserved) before moving to Fairlawn Drive in 1965. The facility occupies a 7.1-acre (2.9 ha) site at the base of a gently sloping hill which the group chose because the site allowed room for growth and parking. The parcel originally contained a row of walnut trees along its southern boundary, however other trees have been planted on the grounds.

The red brick building has five distinct sections (narthex, sanctuary, office wing, fellowship hall, and chapel) built around a central courtyard. The windows are tall and narrow.

The sanctuary is the principal interior space of the building. It is a windowless room, made up of simple elements that combine to create a space that is at the same time dramatic and serene. Each element is a simple object—a brick wall, a beam, an opening, a skylight—but all exaggerated slightly in size, proportion, or height.

== See also ==
- List of National Historic Landmarks in Indiana
- National Register of Historic Places listings in Bartholomew County, Indiana
