= Harry Weese =

American modernist architect (1915–1998)

- Born: June 30, 1915; Evanston, Illinois, US
- Died: October 29, 1998 (aged 83); Manteno, Illinois, US
- Education: Massachusetts Institute of Technology (SB 1938)
- Occupation: Architect
- Buildings: Arena Stage; Time-Life Building; The United States embassy in Accra, Ghana
- Projects: Washington Metro

Harry Mohr Weese (June 30, 1915 – October 29, 1998) was an American architect who had an important role in 20th-century modernism and historic preservation. His brother, Ben Weese, was also a renowned architect.

== Early life and education ==
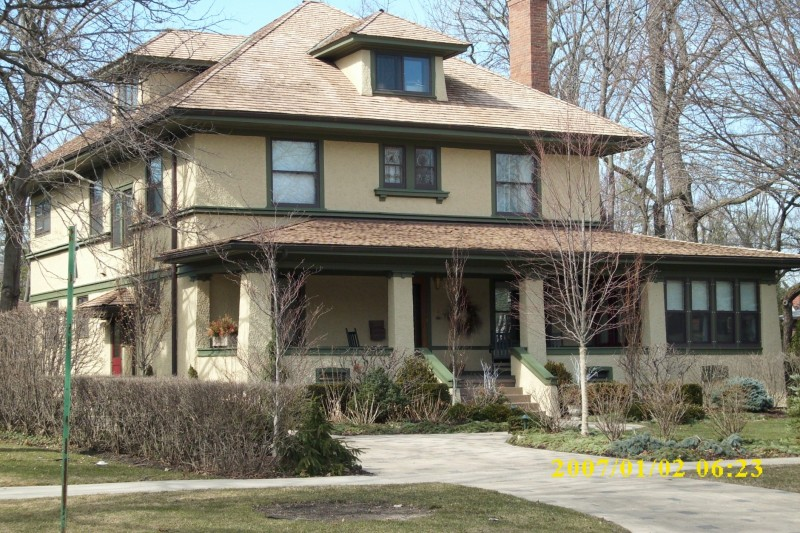
Weese grew up in this house in Kenilworth, Illinois.

Weese was born on June 30, 1915, in Evanston, Illinois, the first son of Harry E. and Marjorie Weese. His father was an Episcopalian, and his mother was a Presbyterian. In 1919, the family moved to a house in Kenilworth, Illinois, where Harry was raised. Weese was enrolled in the progressive Joseph Sears School in 1919. By 1925, Weese decided that he wanted to be either an artist or an architect.

After graduating from New Trier High School, Weese enrolled at the Massachusetts Institute of Technology in 1933 to earn a Bachelor in Architecture degree. Weese also took architecture classes at Yale University starting in 1936. Weese studied under Alvar Aalto at MIT, and fraternized with classmates I.M. Pei and Eero Saarinen. As his schooling was at the height of the Great Depression, Weese avoided studying expensive historical revival styles in favor of more-affordable modern styles. In summer 1937, Weese toured northern Europe on a bicycle, fostering his appreciation for the Modernist movement.

Upon his return to the United States, Weese was offered a fellowship at the Cranbrook Academy of Art through Saarinen, whose father Eliel oversaw the school. At Cranbrook, he studied city planning, pottery, and textiles while learning more about Modernist principles. He worked alongside other emerging Modernist designers such as Ralph Rapson, Florence Knoll, and Charles Eames.

== Career ==
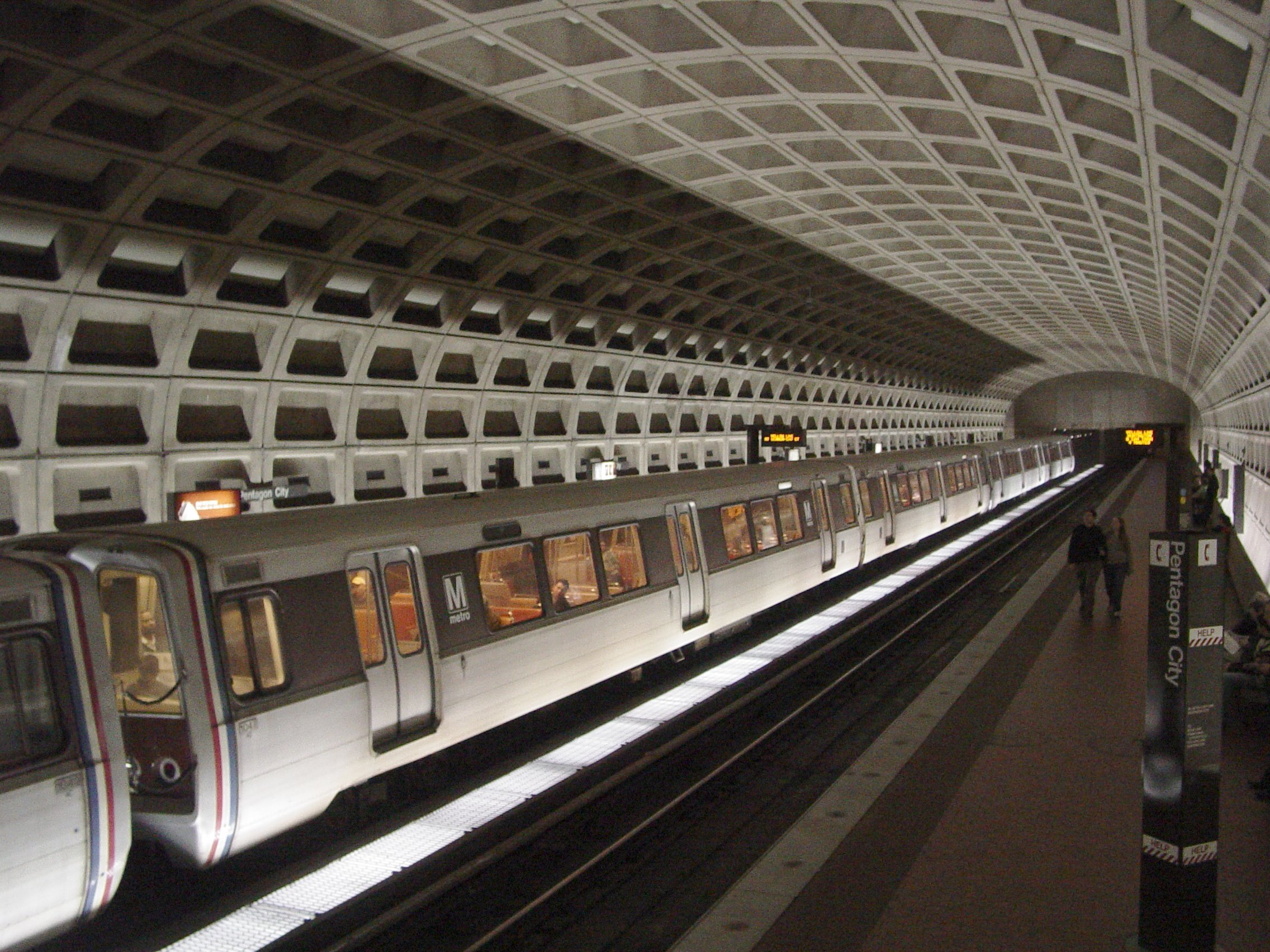
Pentagon City Station, a typical stop on the Washington Metro, considered one of the best examples of brutalist architecture.

After graduating in 1940, Weese formed a short-lived architectural partnership in Chicago with classmate Benjamin Baldwin, whose sister Kitty he would later marry. He soon left to join the firm of Skidmore, Owings and Merrill (SOM), and soon after that took a commission as an engineering officer in the United States Navy for World War II. After the war ended in 1945, Weese moved back to Chicago and rejoined SOM.

In 1947, Weese started his independent design firm, Harry Weese Associates. His first commissions, such as the Robert and Suzanne Drucker House in Wilmette, Illinois, were houses for family members and close associates. By the late 1950s, Weese began to receive major commissions. Although he continued to plan houses, Weese also built civic projects such as the Metropolitan Correctional Center in Chicago.

The Washington Metro in the Washington metropolitan area helped Weese become the foremost designer of rail systems during the peak of his career. He subsequently was commissioned to oversee rail projects in Miami, Los Angeles, Dallas, and Buffalo. He was named a Fellow of the American Institute of Architects in 1961 and received the Arnold W. Brunner Memorial Prize from the National Institute of Arts and Letters in 1964. Weese also designed the First Baptist Church in Columbus, Indiana.

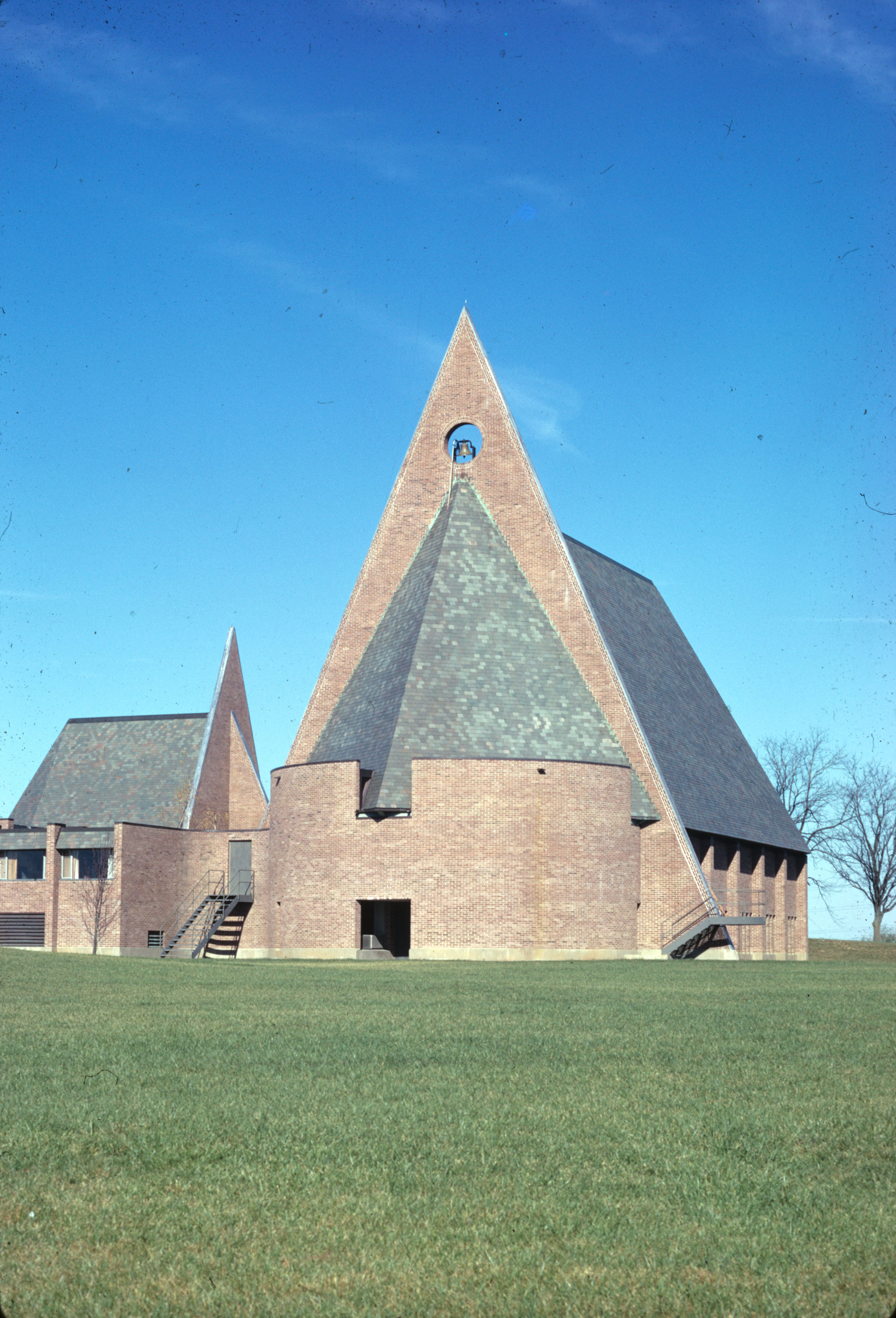
First Baptist Church in Columbus, Indiana, built in 1965

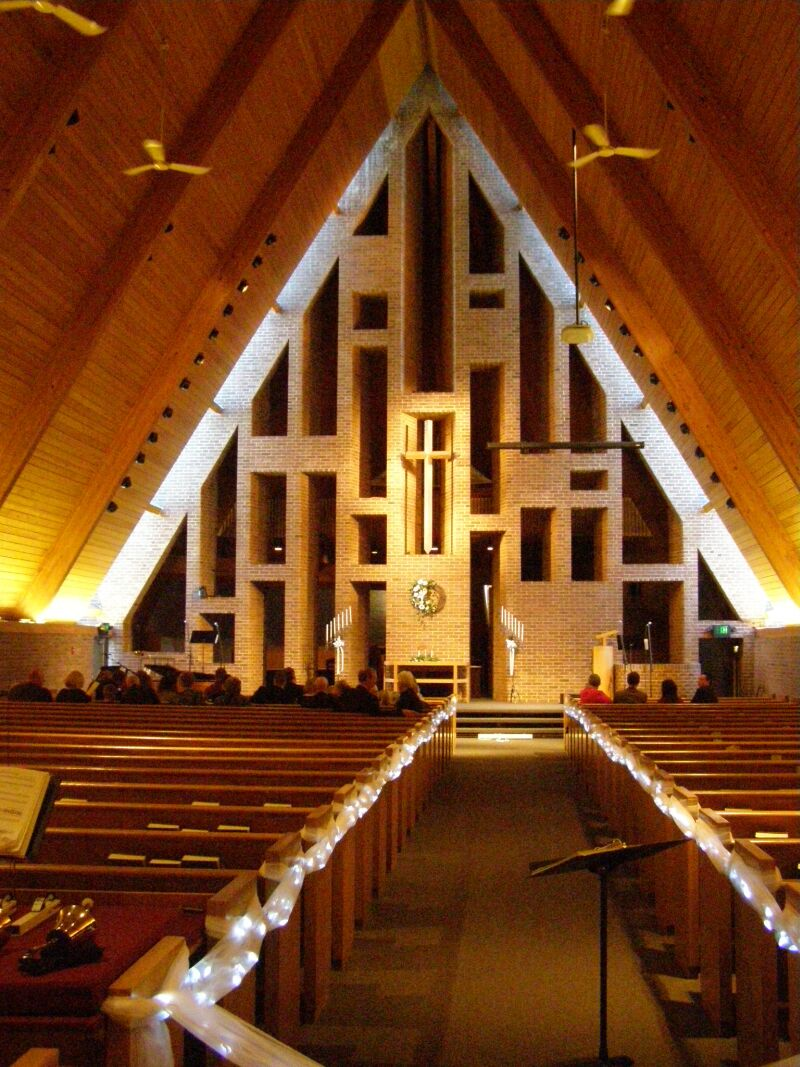
First Baptist Church, interior sanctuary

Weese was also known for his advocacy of historic preservation; he would be remembered as the architect who "shaped Chicago’s skyline and the way the city thought about everything from the lakefront to its treasure-trove of historical buildings". He led the restoration of Adler & Sullivan's Auditorium Building, and Daniel Burnham's Field Museum of Natural History and Orchestra Hall. In 1978, Harry Weese & Associates received the Architecture Firm Award from the American Institute of Architects (AIA). Weese also served as a judge for the Vietnam Veterans Memorial design competition, and defended fledgling architect Maya Lin's unconventional design.

In the late 1970s, Weese helped plan a 1992 World's Fair in Chicago. He was also the prime mover in the preservation, rehabilitation and adaptive reuse of Chicago's Printer's Row neighborhood, converting loft buildings that had housed printing-industry firms into apartments and offices, thus proving the economic viability of repurposing historic urban buildings.

From the mid-1980s, Weese drank heavily and his reputation faded; he died after years of going in and out of alcohol rehabilitation and a series of disabling strokes.

== Personal life ==
Weese's parents were Protestant Christians, but he himself was non-religious. While being interviewed by the building committee of the Seventeenth Church of Christ, Scientist in Chicago, when asked of his religious views, he said, "My father was Episcopalian, my mother Presbyterian, and I’m an architect".

== Legacy ==
In a 1998 obituary, architectural critic Herbert Muschamp wrote that "Mr. Weese designed a systemwide network of stations that rank among the greatest public works of this century", referring to his design of the Washington Metro system. Muschamp noted that the vaulted ceilings at the crossings of subway lines "induce an almost religious sense of awe".

In 2007, the design of the Washington Metro's vaulted-ceiling stations was voted number 106 on the "America's Favorite Architecture" list compiled by the American Institute of Architects (AIA), and was the only brutalist design to win a place among the 150 selected by this public survey. In January 2014, the AIA announced that it would present its Twenty-five Year Award to the Washington Metro system for "an architectural design of enduring significance" that "has stood the test of time by embodying architectural excellence for 25 to 35 years". The announcement cited the key role of Harry Weese, who conceived and implemented a "common design kit-of-parts" which continues to guide the construction of new Metro stations over a quarter-century later.

== Works ==
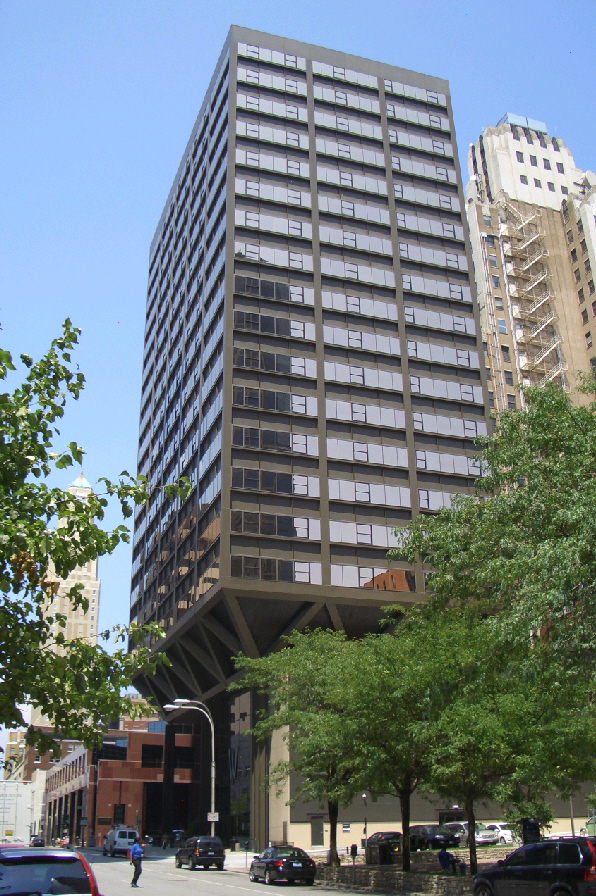
Mercantile Bank in Kansas City, Missouri, a 20-story office tower on a pedestal base of steel columns with striking exposed triangular trusses

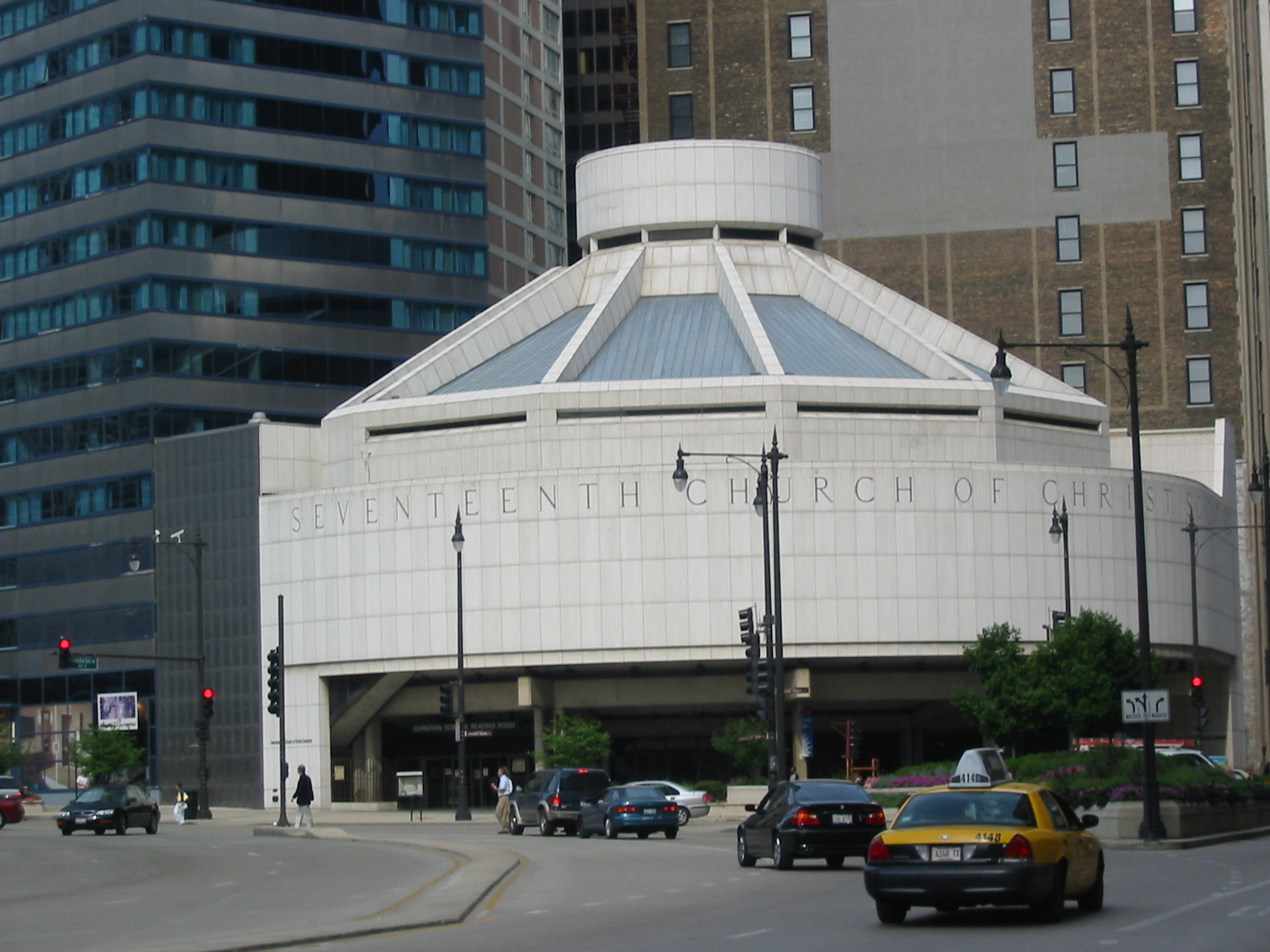
Seventeenth Church of Christ, Scientist, Chicago, Illinois

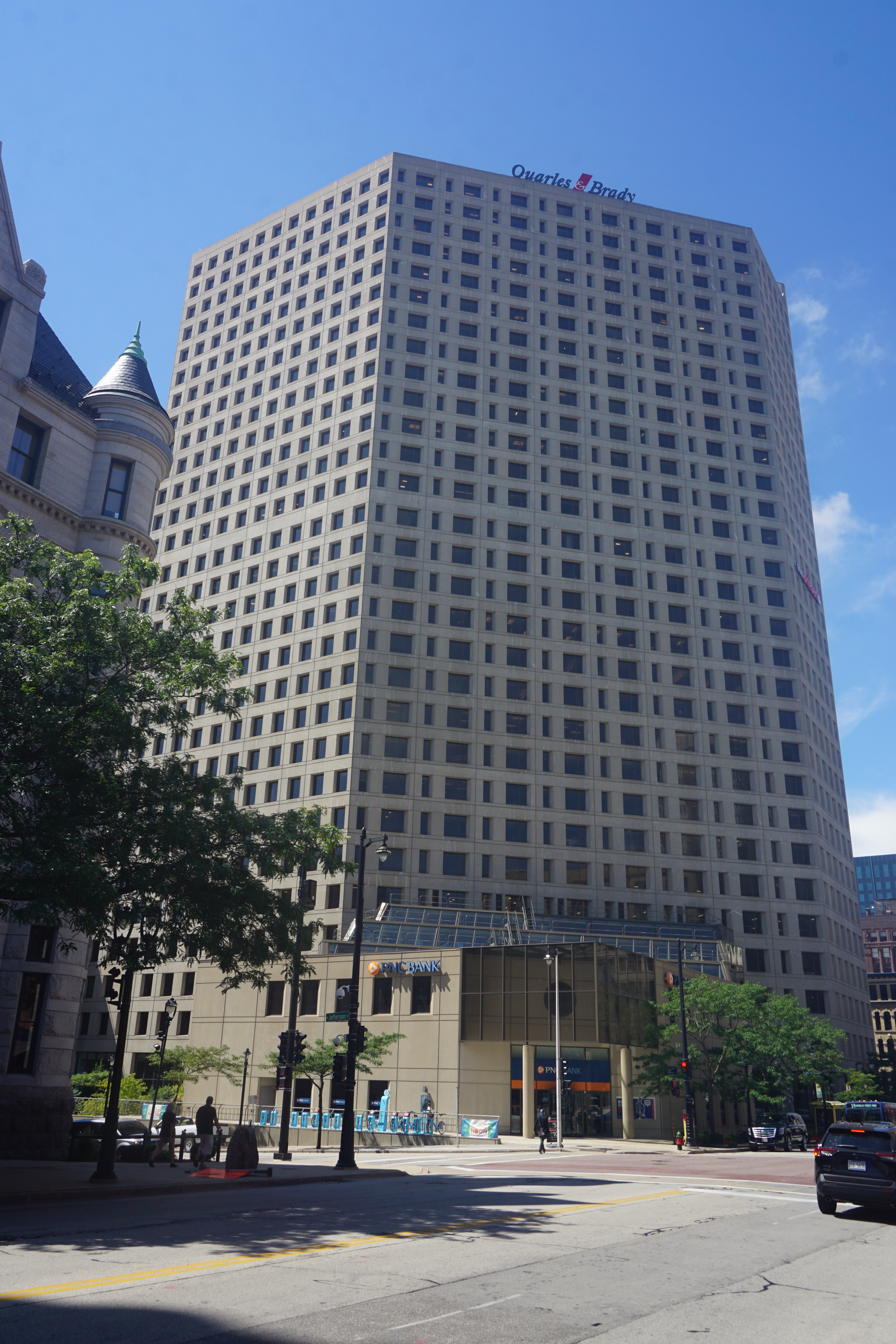
411 East Wisconsin Center in Milwaukee, Wisconsin

Weese is best known as the designer and architect of the first group of stations in the Washington Metro system. Other well known works include:

- 1952 - Davis Clinic, Marion, Indiana - a new model for delivering healthcare.
- 1954 - Robert and Suzanne Drucker House in Wilmette, Illinois
- 1956 - 227 East Walton Place Apartment Building in Chicago, now a Chicago Landmark building
- Alpha Sigma Phi, Alpha Xi chapter House at Illinois Institute of Technology in Chicago
- The United States Embassy Building, Accra, Ghana, closed in 1998
- 1960 - Arena Stage, Washington DC (remodeled in 2010 by Bing Thom Architects)
- 1960 - Pierce Tower, undergraduate residence hall at the University of Chicago (demolished 2013)
- 1963 - St Thomas' Episcopal Church, (Menasha, Wisconsin) Similar to the First Baptist Church, Columbus, Indiana, but with a more sweeping roof design and towering steeple.
- 1963 - Sterling Morton Library, The Morton Arboretum
- 1965 - Gray Campus Center at Reed College in Portland, OR
- 1965 - Aubrey R. Watzek Sports Center at Reed College. Renovated in 2016 after the roof collapsed during an unusually severe winter storm.
- 1965 - First Baptist Church, in Columbus, Indiana
- 1966 - Fewkes Tower at 55 W. Chestnut Street (formerly 838 N. Dearborn Street), Chicago
- 1968 - Seventeenth Church of Christ, Scientist, Chicago
- 1969 - Time-Life Building, Chicago
- 1969 - Marcus Center for the Performing Arts, Milwaukee
- 1969 - Humanities Building at the University of Wisconsin–Madison, widely considered one the Midwest's best examples of brutalist architecture but slated for demolition by 2030.
- 1969 - The Upper School (high school) building of The Latin School of Chicago, Chicago
- 1970 - Formica Building, Cincinnati
- 1972 - The Given Institute, Aspen Colorado (demolished 2011)
- 1973 - Westin Crown Center Hotel, Kansas City, Missouri
- 1975 - Mercantile Bank, Kansas City, Missouri
- 1975 - Oak Park Village Hall, Oak Park, Illinois
- 1975 - William J. Campbell United States Courthouse Annex in downtown Chicago (formerly known as the Metropolitan Correctional Center, Chicago.) Federal temporary holding prison which has no window bars, instead each cell is provided with a vertical 5" slot window. Weese was mandated to follow then new federal prison architectural guidelines, like cells having no bars and by original design each prisoner was housed separately.
- 1977 - O'Brian Hall at the State University of New York at Buffalo
- 1979 - Middletown City Building, Middletown, Ohio
- 1981 - Fulton House, 345 N. Canal Street, Chicago. Converted 19th century 16-story cold-storage warehouse building to condominium building.
- 1985 - 411 East Wisconsin Center, Milwaukee
- Chazen Museum of Art at the University of Wisconsin–Madison, formerly known as the Elvehjem Museum of Art
- River Cottages at 357-365 N. Canal Street, Chicago. Sloped, structurally expressive facade responds to the angle and cross bracing of the railroad bridge directly across the river.
- The Healey Library, University of Massachusetts Boston
- Swissôtel, Chicago. The cross-section is an equilateral triangle, so that two-thirds of the rooms have a view of the main stem of the Chicago River.

Weese also led numerous restoration projects including:

- 1967 - Louis Sullivan's Auditorium Building in Chicago (1967)
- Field Museum of Natural History, Chicago
- Orchestra Hall, Chicago
- Union Station, Washington, D.C.

Weese designed over 80 single home and residential buildings, including:

- His primary residence in Barrington, Illinois
- "Shadowcliff", Ellison Bay, Wisconsin
- Evanston, Illinois
- Glen Lake, Michigan
- Muskoka Lakes, Ontario, Canada
- Red House, Barrington, Illinois
- Tangeman House, Ontario, home of Clementine Tangeman and Robert Stone Tangeman
- Wayne, Illinois
