= Old Dorm Block =

Building at Reed College, Portland, Oregon, U.S.

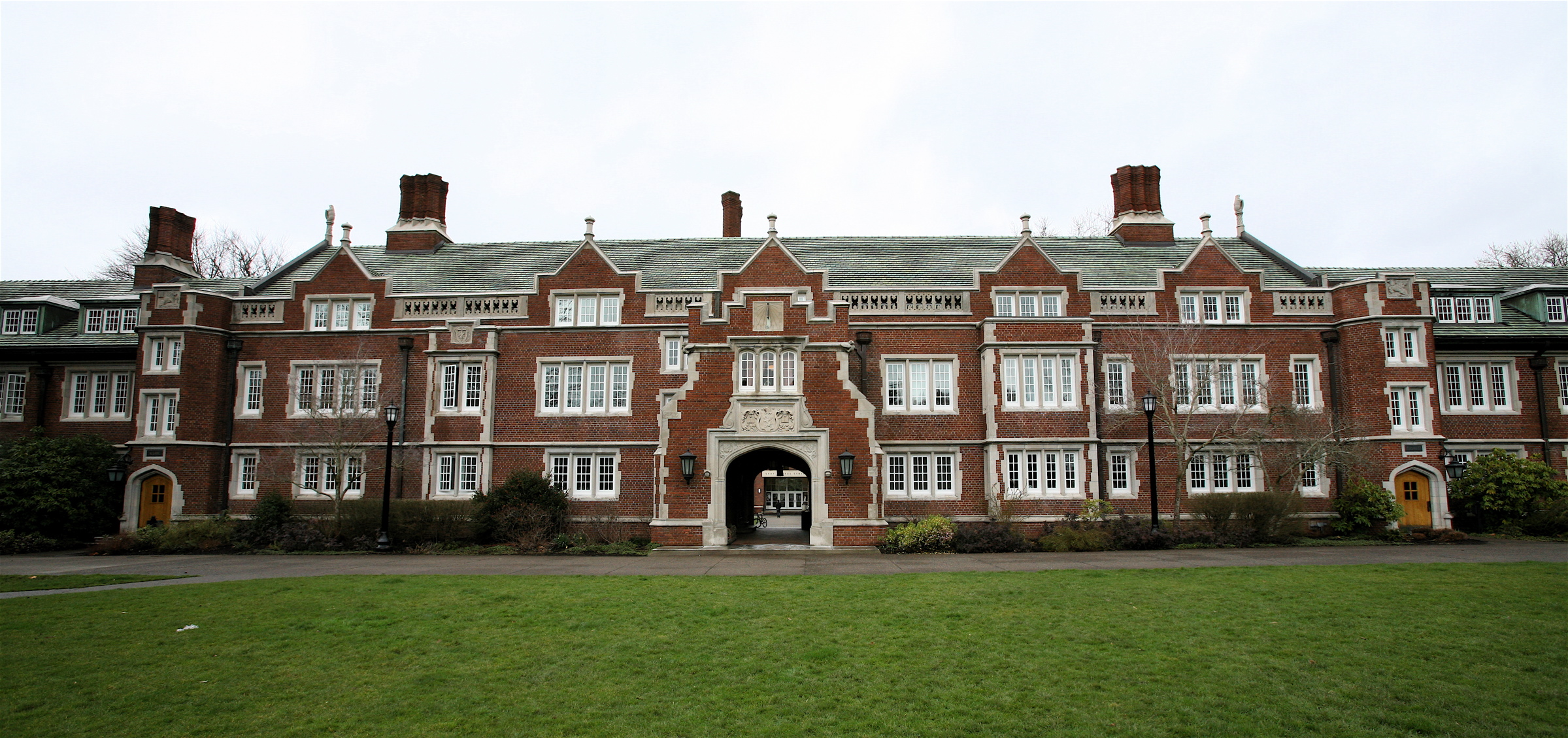
- The building's exterior in 2007

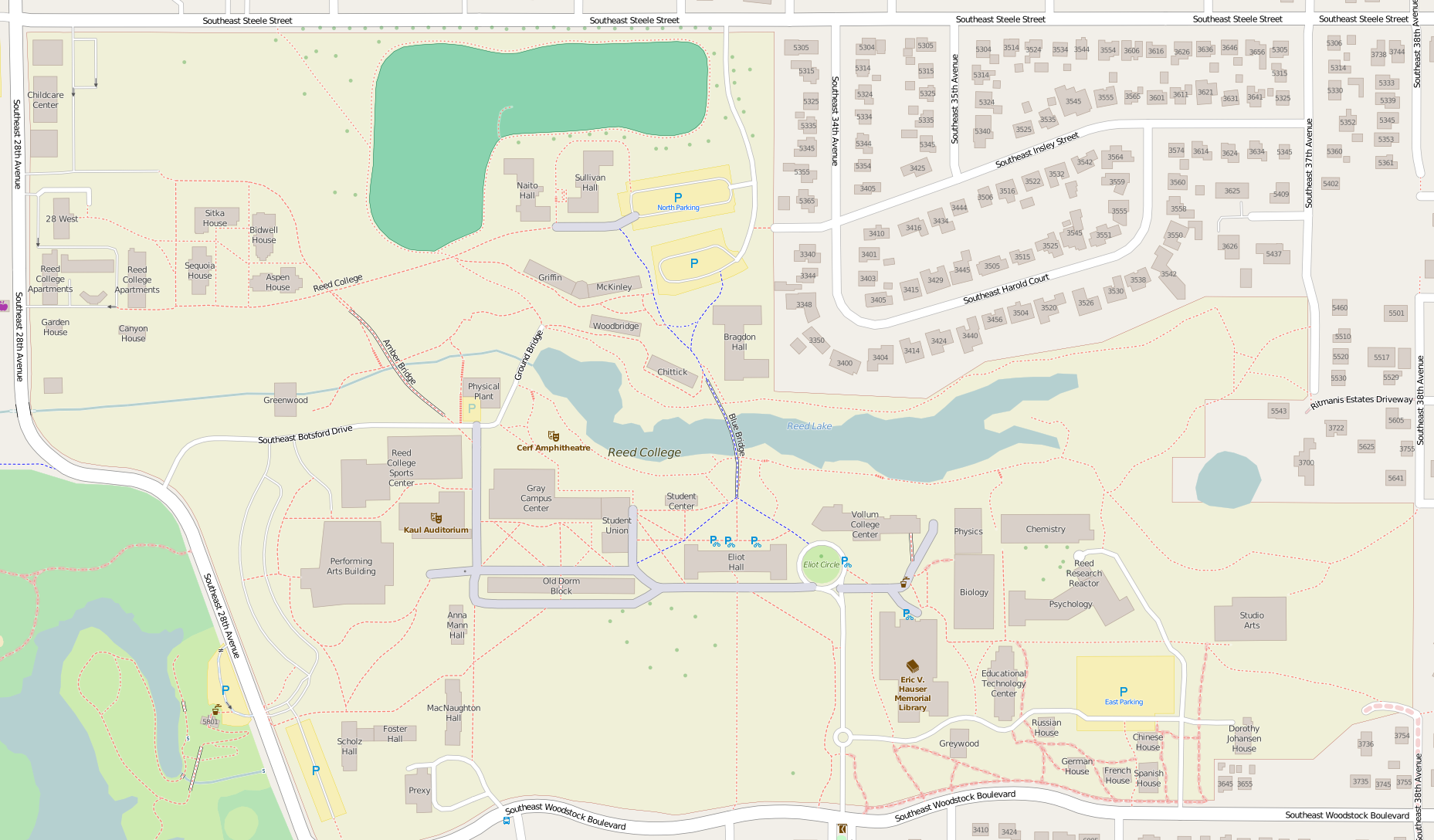
- Location on the Reed College campus

General information
- Location: Reed College, Portland, Oregon, United States
- Coordinates: 45.48079°N 122.63209°W

Old Dorm Block is a building on the Reed College campus in Portland, Oregon, in the United States. It was built in 1912 and remodeled in 1992.
