= Performing Arts Building =

Building at Reed College, Portland, Oregon, U.S.

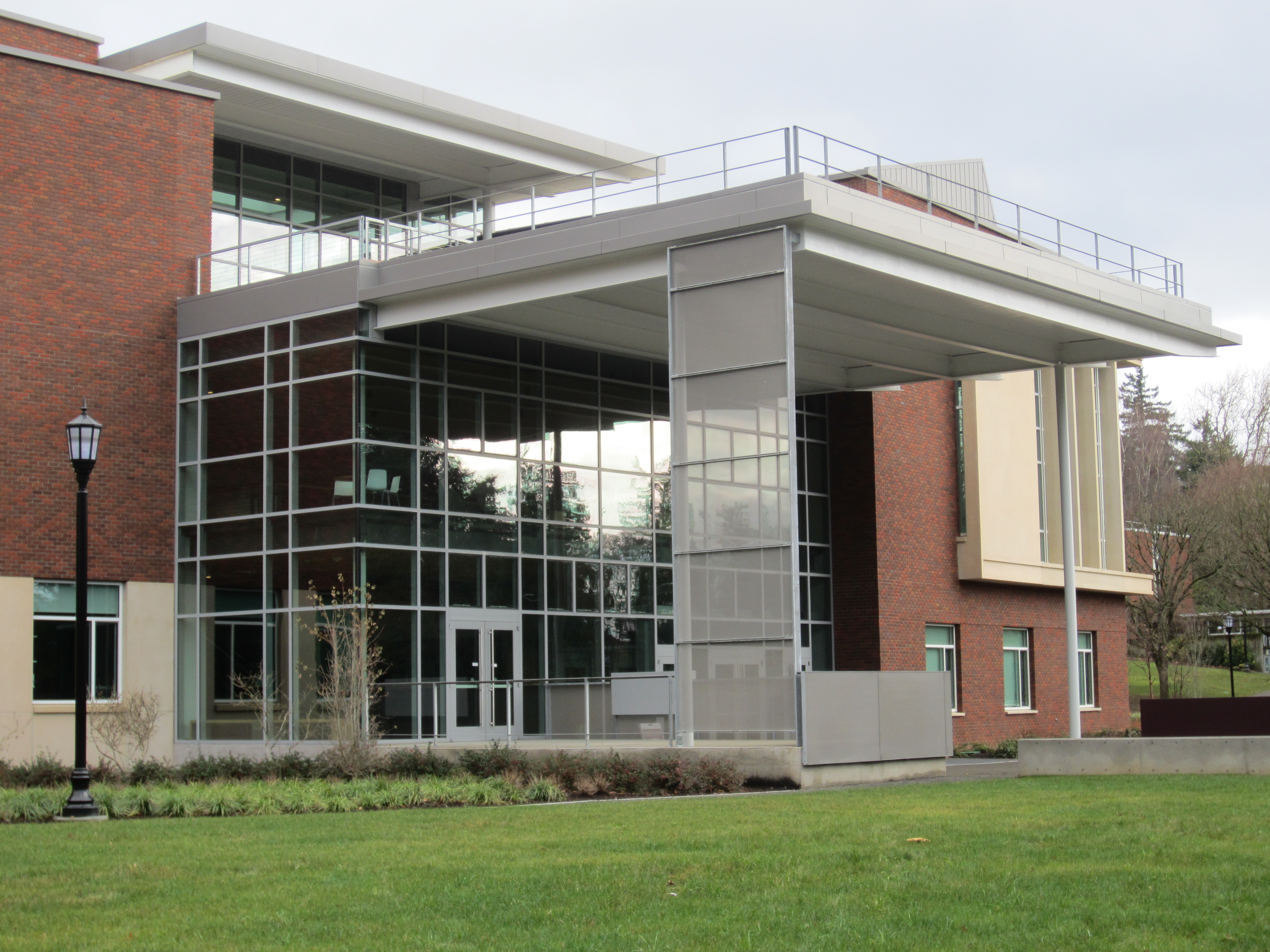
- The building's exterior in 2013

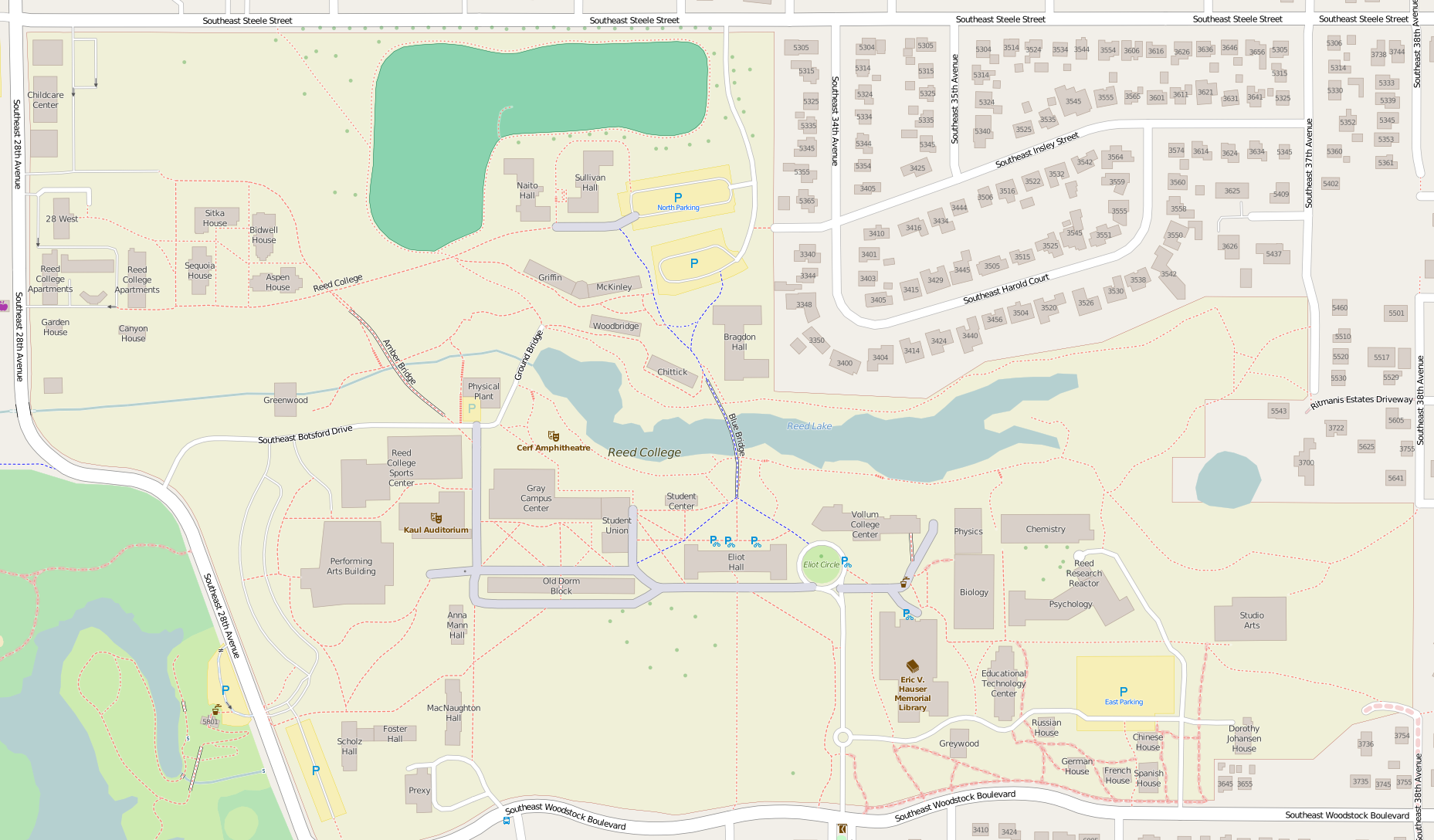
- Location within Reed College Portland OR

General information
- Location: Reed College, Portland, Oregon, United States
- Coordinates: 45.48093°N 122.63418°W

The Performing Arts Building is located on the Reed College campus in southeast Portland, Oregon, in the United States. The three-story, 78,000 square foot building cost $28 million.

== History ==
A groundbreaking was slated for mid 2011. The building opened with a ribbon-cutting ceremony on September 20, 2013.

The building was designed by Opsis Architecture. The firm was recognized at the 2014 U.S. Wood Design Awards. The building's design has also been recognized by the AIA Education Facility Design Awards.
