= Weese, Webster County, West Virginia =

Weese
- Unincorporated community
- Location within the state of West Virginia Weese (the United States)
- Coordinates: 38°28′55″N 80°33′21″W
- Country: United States
- State: West Virginia
- County: Webster
- Elevation: 1,709 ft (521 m)
- Time zone: UTC-5 (Eastern (EST))
  - Summer (DST): UTC-4 (EDT)
- GNIS ID: 1553399

Weese is an unincorporated community in Webster County, West Virginia, United States.
