= Weese, Randolph County, West Virginia =

Weese
- Unincorporated community
- Location within the state of West Virginia Weese (the United States)
- Coordinates: 38°53′5″N 79°42′37″W
- Country: United States
- State: West Virginia
- County: Randolph
- Elevation: 2,316 ft (706 m)
- Time zone: UTC-5 (Eastern (EST))
  - Summer (DST): UTC-4 (EDT)
- GNIS ID: 1553400

Weese is an unincorporated community in Randolph County, West Virginia, United States. The 1916 history of Randolph County identifies Jacob Weese as the progenitor of the Weese family in the county and records that he settled there during its early years.
