= Ben Weese =

American architect (1929–2024)

- Born: Benjamin Horace Weese; 1929; Evanston, Illinois, U.S.
- Died: April 29, 2024 (aged 94); Chicago, Illinois, U.S.
- Education: Harvard University
- Occupation: Architect
- Spouse: Cynthia Weese (m. 1964)

Benjamin Horace Weese (1929 – April 29, 2024) was an American architect hailing from Chicago, and a member of the architects group, the Chicago Seven. Weese was the younger brother of Chicago architect Harry Weese.

== Life and career ==
Born in Evanston, Illinois, Weese received BArch and MArch degrees from Harvard University, and a certificate from the École des Beaux-Arts in Fontainebleau, France. He returned to Chicago in 1957 into his older brother's firm, Harry Weese Associates, which specialized in urban renewal and subsidized housing projects. In the late 1970s, he was a member of the Chicago Seven, a group which emerged in opposition to the doctrinal application of modernism, as represented particularly in Chicago by the followers of Ludwig Mies van der Rohe.

In 1977, Weese opened his own firm, Weese Seegers Hickey Weese, with his wife, Cynthia Weese. This turned out to be an award-winning firm, later becoming Weese Langley Weese, and is known for non-profit and educational projects with an emphasis on historical appreciation and preservation.

Weese died from complications of Alzheimer's disease in Chicago, on April 29, 2024, at the age of 94.

== See also ==
- Chicago Seven (architects)
