= Dowker =

Dowker is a surname. Notable people with the surname include:

- Clifford Hugh Dowker (1912–1982), Canadian mathematician
- Fay Dowker (born 1965), British physicist
- Felicity Dowker (born 1980), Australian fantasy writer
- Hasted Dowker (1900–1986), Canadian Anglican priest
- Ray Dowker (1919–2004), New Zealand cricketer
- Yael Dowker (1919–2016), Israeli-English mathematician

== See also ==
- Dowker Island, is an uninhabited island in Lake Saint Louis, a widening of the Saint Lawrence River south of Montreal Island, Quebec
- Dowker notation, is mathematical notation
- Dowker space, is mathematical field of general topology
- The Haunting of Hewie Dowker, is an Australian film
