= A. H. Bulbulian Residence =

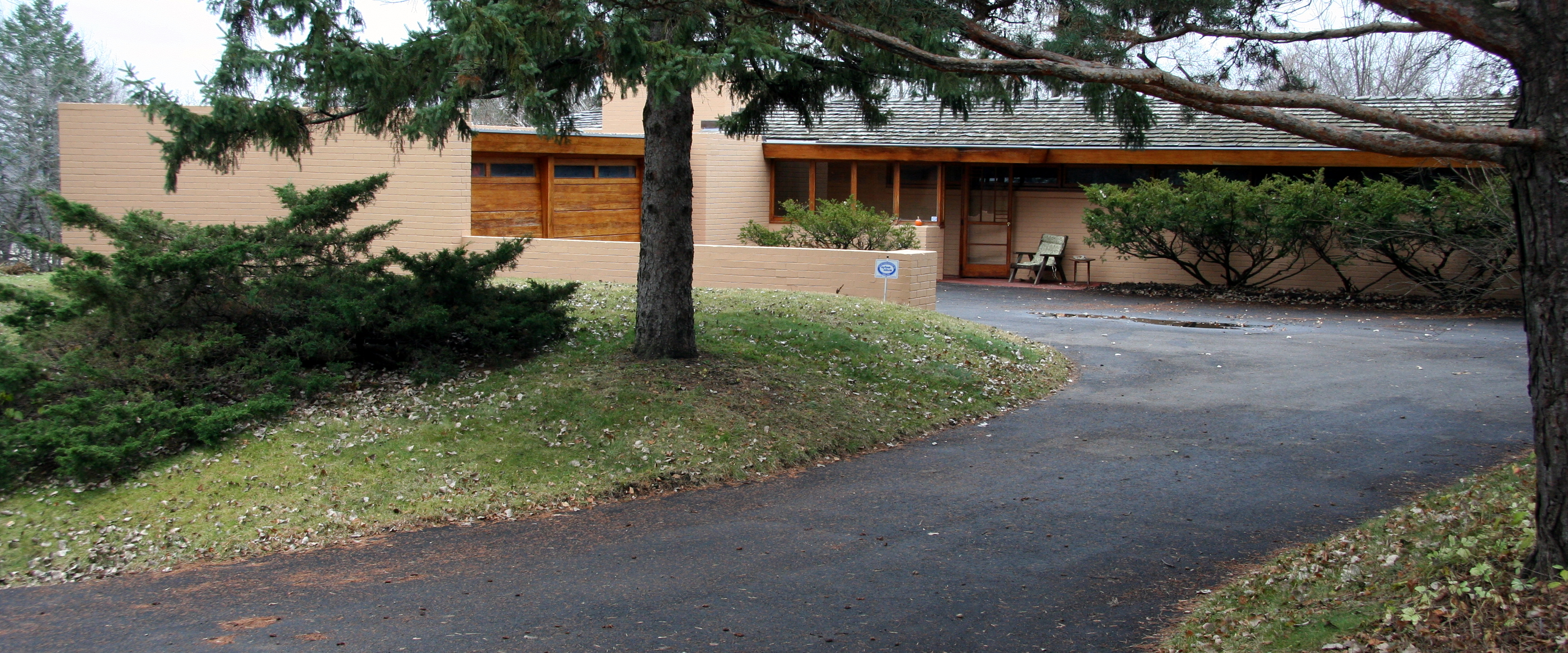
- The Bulbulian House as seen from Skyline Drive, Rochester, Minnesota

- Location within Minnesota
- Interactive map showing Bulbulian House’s location

General information
- Type: House
- Architectural style: Usonian
- Location: 1229 Skyline Drive; Rochester, Minnesota; United States
- Coordinates: 44°00′27″N 92°29′10″W
- Construction started: 1947

Design and construction
- Architect: Frank Lloyd Wright

The A. H. Bulbulian Residence is a house located at 1229 Skyline Drive in Rochester, Minnesota, United States. Designed by noted architect Frank Lloyd Wright it was completed in 1947 for Arthur H. Bulbulian, a pioneer in the field of facial prosthetics. It is down the street from the Thomas Keys House and not far from the James McBean Residence, all three examples of Wright's Usonian genre of architecture. The Bulbulian Residence is a one-story house built with one 120-degree angle, and is constructed of cement brick and cypress. The house has recently been restored to near-original condition.

== See also ==
- List of Frank Lloyd Wright works
