= University Hill Farms Historic District =

Historic district in Wisconsin, United States

- U.S. National Register of Historic Places
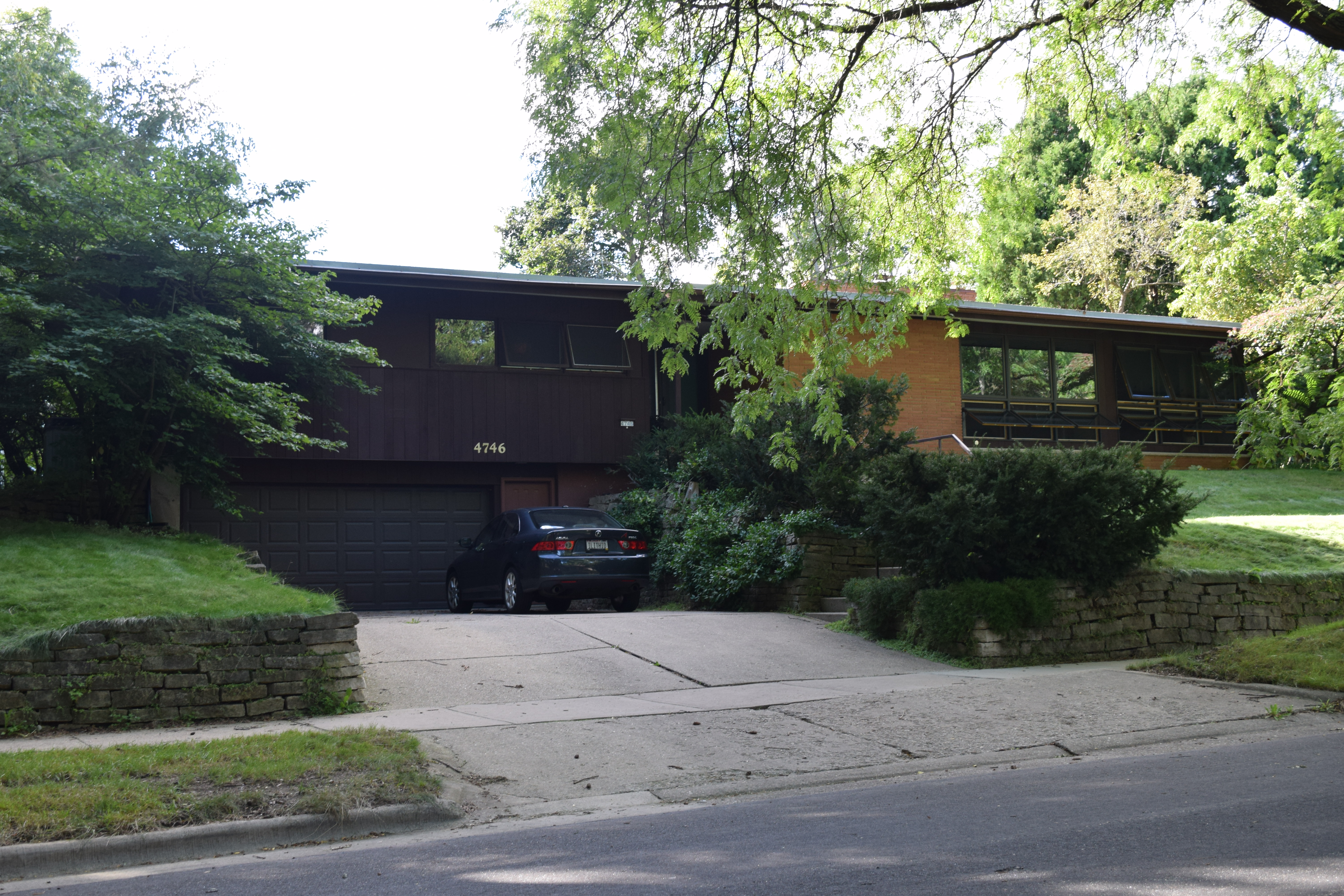
- A raised Ranch house within the district
- Location: Madison, Wisconsin
- Coordinates: 43.065°N 89.46385°W
- NRHP reference No.: 15000402
- Added to NRHP: August 11, 2015

The University Hill Farms Historic District is part of a subdivision on the west side of Madison, Wisconsin, built on land which was once an experimental farm of the University of Wisconsin. Starting in the 1950s the UW subdivided most of its 600-acre farm into residential lots and worked with the city of Madison to provide city services and develop a planned suburb. In 2015 the district was added to the National Register of Historic Places.

== History ==
In 1836 Josiah A. Noonan bought the 156-acre piece of land that would become the core of University Hill Farms, around the time he was helping with the original plat of Madison. Around 1845 Noonan's sister Clarissa and her husband Harmon J. Hill began to run Noonan's farm, and in 1849 they bought it. The Hills were apparently successful farmers, building a "very fine Italianate style Gabled Ell farmhouse" in 1857. They ran the farm for almost fifty years, retiring in 1893.

The University of Wisconsin was founded in 1848, with its early curriculum focused on geography, English grammar, Latin and Greek. But interest grew in more practical subjects, and with the Morrill Act of 1862, the UW began offering instruction in agriculture. In 1866 a department of agriculture was established and the university bought a 196-acre farm west of campus. In 1897, with campus growth eating away at the old farm, and with the emergence of mechanized agriculture, the UW needed a larger experimental farm, so bought the Hill farm further west. In following years, the UW bought adjacent farms until in 1947 the University's experimental "Hill Farms" totalled 613 acres.

By the 1950s, Madison had grown itself into a housing shortage. Residential subdivisions had grown around all sides of the UW's experimental farm, leaving it no space to expand, and the farm's land had become valuable. The Board of Regents decided to sell the farm to be subdivided into lots, and use the profits to create a much larger experimental farm outside the city. The initial thought was to simply sell the whole parcel to a developer, but the Madison Board of Realtors advised that the UW could raise more money by developing the land itself.

Working with the UW, the city of Madison annexed the new land and had its planning engineer Walter Johnson draw up a preliminary plan for the new subdivision, with curvilinear streets, many cul-de-sacs, and areas reserved for parks, schools, and churches. The surrounding subdivisions lacked any commercial properties other than the seven-store Shorewood Shopping Center, so Johnson added retail areas in the new subdivision. The Shorewood Shopping Center was demolished in 1979. Along with the parks, this should make the area a complete community, sparing residents from frequent drives to other parts of the city. The retail areas were ringed with apartments and parks as a buffer for the single-family residential areas. Johnson followed leading urban planning ideas of the day which had been used in places like Radburn, New Jersey. The city agreed to buy 85 acres of the subdivision for schools and parks. In 1955 the regents hired Chicago-based but nationally-known land planner Carl L. Gardner & Associates to create a master plan. Working with Professor Richard Ratcliff of the UW's Commerce School, Gardner kept many aspects of Johnson's plan, but replaced the cul-de-sacs with long blocks, allowed for more residential lots, and added space for a school and an area for state office buildings.

Development occurred in phases. In 1955 the first 100-acre section was platted around Waukesha Street. Storm sewers, water lines and gas lines were laid under the streets and sidewalks and curbing were installed. The phased development approach avoided swamping the real estate market with 500 acres of new lots. The UW borrowed money to finance the first phase, then used proceeds from selling first-phase lots to finance the second phase, etc. Most of the lots in the first plat were sold by the end of 1956, so the second phase was begun with platting in 1957.

The UW also decided to attach covenants to the deeds when lots were sold, to guarantee a neighborhood character that would appeal to young middle class and professional families. Most of the residential lots were restricted to single-family homes no taller than two stories, with attached garages and no outbuildings. An Architectural Control Committee reviewed and approved building plans. Minimum square-foot buildings were required for different lot sizes. As a result of these constraints, most of the houses are of moderate size.

The house designs are styles popular from the 1950s to 1980s. 613 are Ranch Style, including split-level and bi-level layouts. Eighty-nine are Contemporary or Wrightian styles. 114 are Colonial Revival style. These are some good examples of the styles:

- The McMillen house at 4809 Bayfield Terrace is a classic Ranch style house built in 1959 by Keith Anderson, general contractor. John McMillen was a timber physicist with the Forest Products Lab. Ranches are one-story structures with strong horizontal lines, low-pitched roofs, overhanging eaves, picture windows, and often basement rec rooms and outside patios. They were typically relatively low-cost builders' houses not designed by architects. 613 of the 820 buildings in the district are Ranch style.
- The Vergeront house at 5010 La Crosse Lane is a split-level Ranch house built in 1958. Robert Vergeront was an attorney and Assistant State Attorney General. Split-levels are a type of Ranch house where a one-story wing intersects a two story wing at mid level. The rationale was to separate noisy areas from quiet areas, with the garage and noisy family room typically on the lowest level, quieter eating and living room on the middle level, and quiet bedrooms on the upper level. Of the 613 Ranch houses in the district 116 are Split-levels.
- The Walstad house at 3 Ashland Court is a Raised Ranch or bi-level house built in 1957 by Fisher and Fisher. Jud Walstad was a chemical engineer for Ray-o-Vac. This is a type of Ranch house designed for sloping sites, in which the living quarters are on one story and the garage and possibly a rec room are nestled beneath. Of the 613 Ranch houses in the district, 76 houses are raised Ranches.
- The Silvestro house at 4814 Bayfield Terrace is a Colonial Revival-style house built in 1959. Hallmarks of the style present in this house are the symmetry and the sidelights and fanlight around the main entrance. Clement Silvestro directed the American Association of State & Local History.

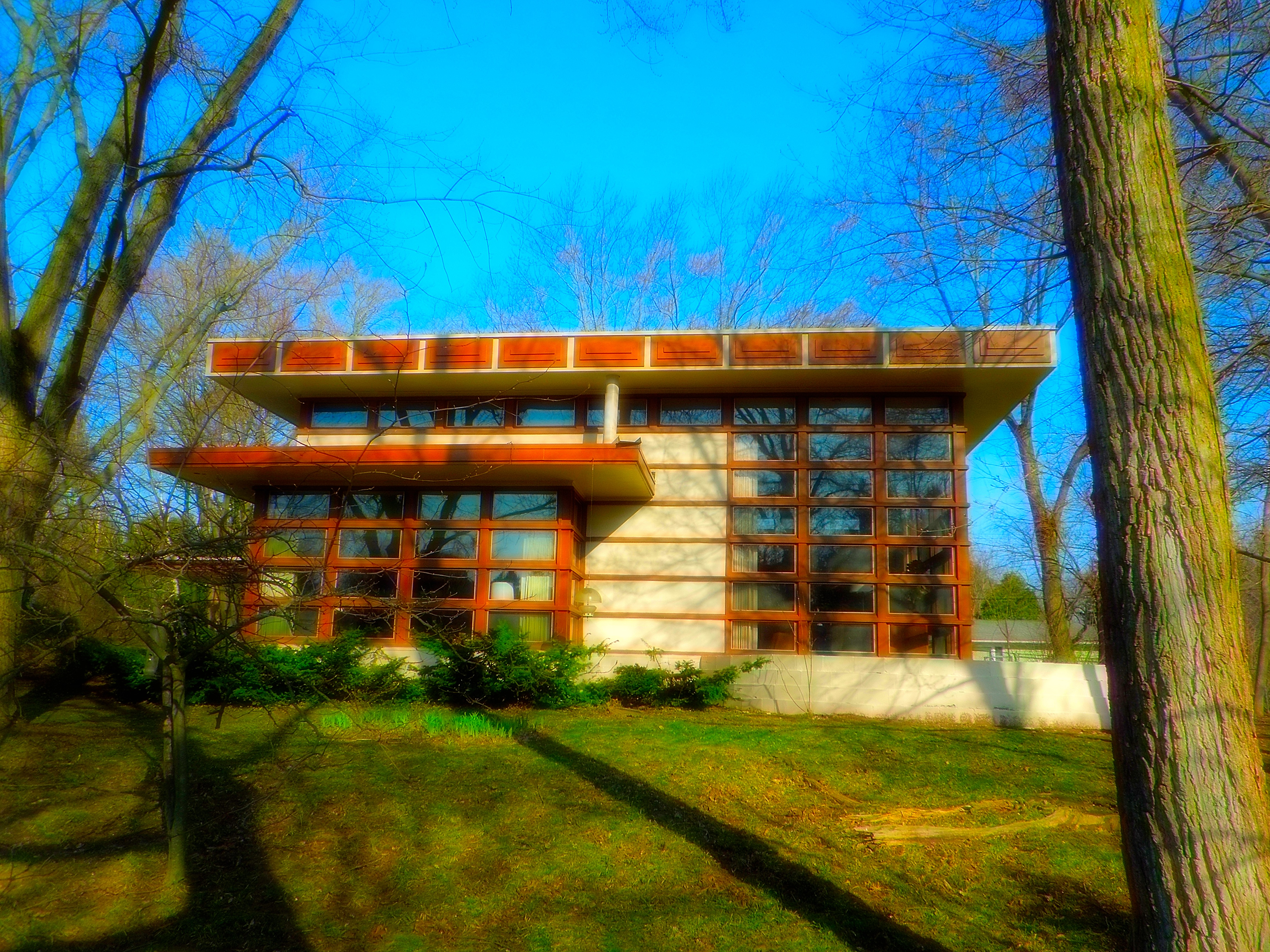
Rudin house, Usonian style, 1959

- The Professor Walter & Ellen Rudin house at 110 Marinette Trail is a prefabricated Usonian-style house designed by Frank Lloyd Wright and built by contractor Marshall Erdman in 1959. The house is two stories, clad in glass and stucco, with a two-story living room facing the windows and moveable bedroom walls. Walter and Mary Ellen Rudin were mathematicians at the UW.
- The Sachtjen house at 5001 Bayfield Terrace is a Contemporary-style house designed by Krueger, Kraft & Associates and built in 1962. Dr. Ken Sachten was an orthopedic surgeon. Contemporary-style architecture is a catch-all category for designs from after WWII which don't draw from historic examples. This particular house has canted brick walls and a flat roof.
- The Chapman house at 4825 Regent Street is another Contemporary-style house - this one designed by Herb Fritz and built in 1963. It has the strong horizontal lines of Prairie School, but with an angled two-story section.
- The Ramirez house at 1 Waushara Circle another Contemporary-style house, built in 1985 by Don Sampson. This house is different from the other Contemporary examples - a full two stories with hints of Japanese pagoda - and demonstrates the breadth of the Contemporary classification. Lincoln and Carolyn Ramirez are physicians.

New additions were platted about one per year until 1960. By that time 510 houses had been built and most of the residential lots were sold. An assessment at that time stated: "A general survey of the families living in the Hill Farms reveals that they are, for the most part, professional people - this list includes a large number of doctors, engineers, attorneys, University faculty members and employees, businessmen, state and city employees, and a few members of the armed forces. Most of these people are in the middle to above middle income groups."

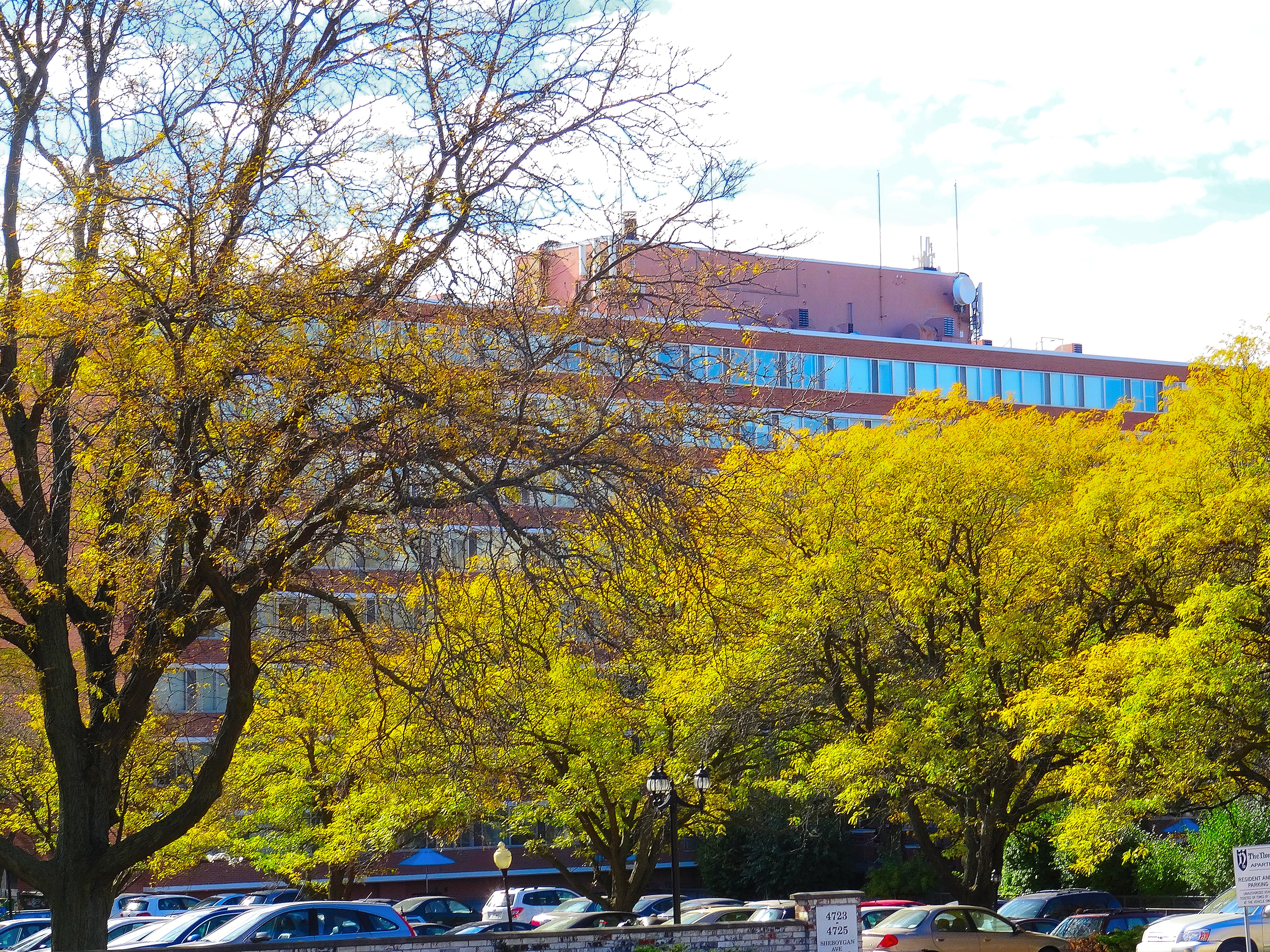
Park Tower Apartments, the one apartment high-rise built in the state office complex, was designed by Flad & Associates and completed in 1962.

Around 1960 the focus shifted to non-residential construction. The Hill Farm Swim Club was completed that year. Construction of Rennebohm Park began in 1961. The state office complex was planned in the subdivision near where Whole Foods now is, and across Sheboygan Avenue the first 140-unit apartment high-rise was begun, aiming to house workers at the state office buildings. Other offices were built around the future Hilldale Shopping Center, including the Wisconsin Life Insurance Company. Construction of Hilldale began the following year, again directed by the UW itself.

The intent had been to concentrate all state offices in the state office complex, but after the first building, the state legislature decided instead to locate future offices near the capitol. The remaining area around the first state office building was filled by other organizations like the American Red Cross and eventually elderly apartments.

The last portion of the subdivision was used as experimental farm by the UW until 1983, when it was finally platted, subdivided, and sold off. In the end, by developing the land itself the UW raised $3,000,000 - six times more than estimated if the UW had sold the whole 600 acres to a private developer. These proceeds were used to establish a new 2300-acre experimental farm near Arlington, Wisconsin and ag buildings on the main campus. The development added $24,000,000 to the City of Madison's tax base by the 1960s.

In 2015 the University Hill Farms Historic District was added to the National Register of Historic Places. The district includes most of the University Hill Farms subdivision, excluding an area around Hilldale Shopping Center because remodeling/rebuilding there had changed its historical appearance. The NRHP judged the district locally significant for its architecture - mostly intact buildings in styles popular in the 1950s to 1970s. It also judged the district significant as a "complete planned suburban community whose creation had a lasting effect on the city of Madison" - an unusual real estate development project run by the UW cooperating with the city of Madison, which succeeded.
