= Arthur H. Bulbulian =

Facial prosthetic doctor of Armenian descent (born 1900)

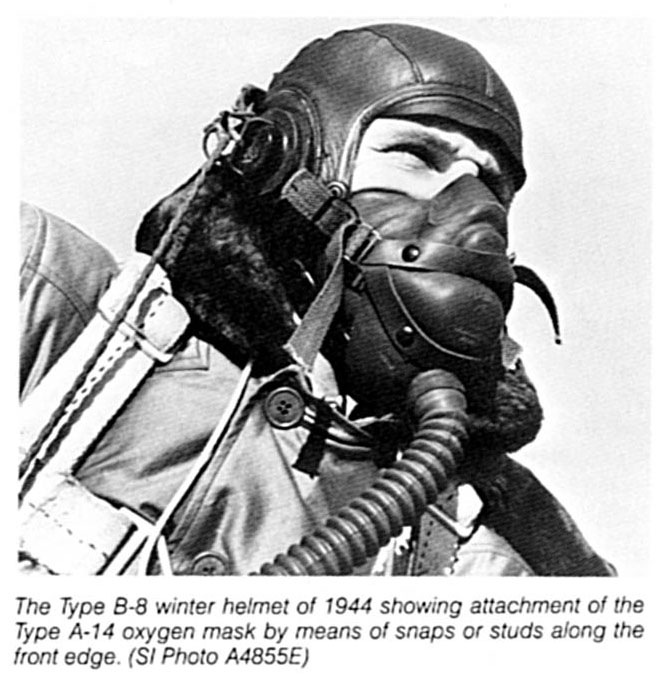
World War II era flying helmet and oxygen mask

Arthur H. Bulbulian (Armenian: Արթուր Բուլբուլյան Art'ur Bulbulyan; December 20, 1900 – June 23, 1996) was a pioneer of Armenian descent in the field of facial prosthetics.

== Biography ==
Born in 1900 near Caesarea, Ottoman Empire, he moved to the United States in 1920. He attended Middlebury College, where he received a B.S. and M.S. degree in Science. He did additional graduate work at Brown University and the University of Iowa. In 1928, he entered the University of Minnesota School of Dentistry, and received the degree of Doctor of Dental Surgery. In 1931 he was appointed as an instructor in orthodontics at the same school.

His worked as part of the Mayo Clinic Aero Medical Unit, which led to his being credited with the creation of the A-14 oxygen mask for the United States Air Force in 1941. The A-14 fighter pilot's mask was frost proof, included a microphone for radio communication, and allowed the pilot to talk and eat while wearing it.

He was a member of the team that included Drs. W. Randolph Lovelace and Walter M. Boothby, leading to the development of the BLB (Boothby, Lovelace and Bulbulian) nasal and orinasal oxygen mask in 1941, which was useful for clinical settings as well as for aviators at high altitudes. The BLB and A-14 oxygen mask was used in combat during World War II.

Dr. Bulbulian was also the first director of the Mayo Medical Museum, contributing to development of content with staff doctors and construction of exhibits. This was the first medical museum in the United States. He also designed and created the exhibits for the Mayo Clinic's display at the 1933 "A Century of Progress Exposition," at the Chicago Worlds Fair.

Bulbulian authored the 1945 medical text Facial Prosthesis, which detailed techniques for prosthetic restorations.

He retired from Mayo Clinic in 1965 after three decades of service and spent his later years in Rochester, Minnesota, where he died at age 95.

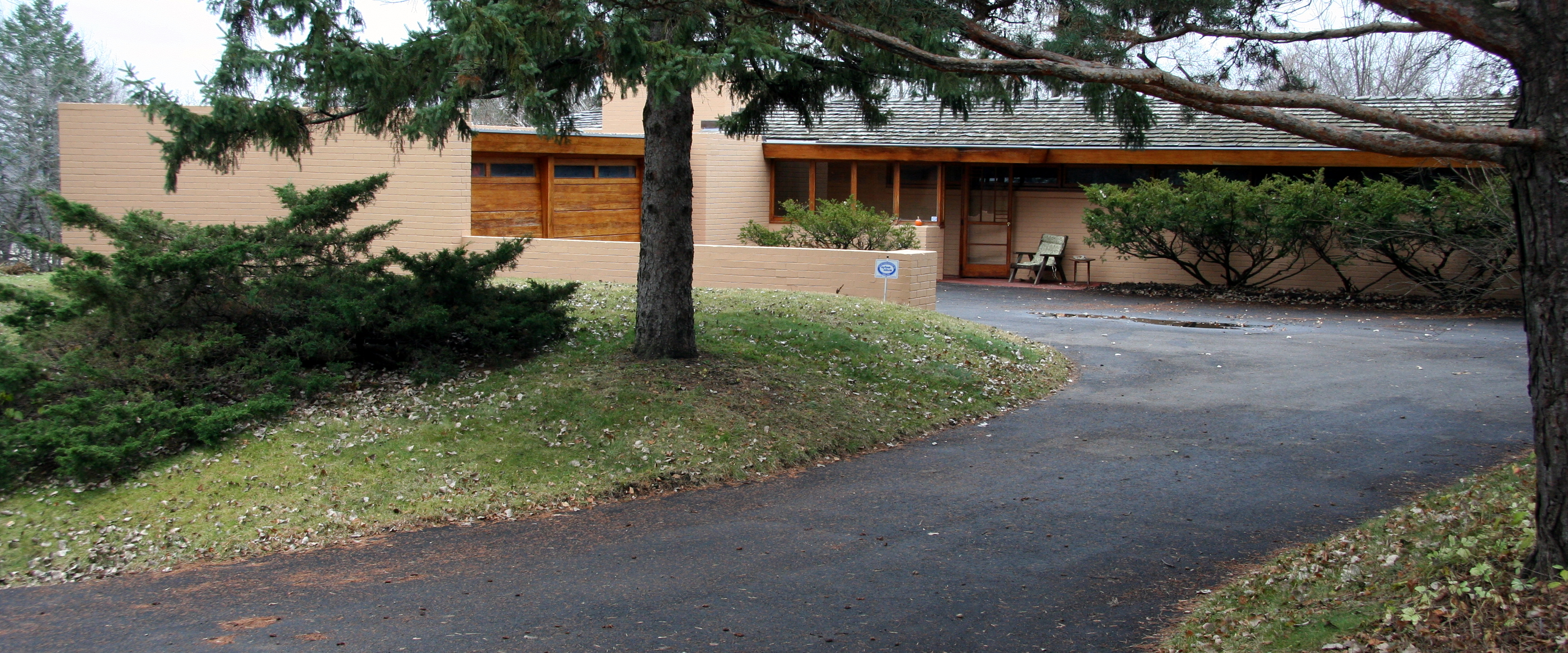
Bulbulian's house in Rochester, Minnesota, designed by Frank Lloyd Wright
