= P-space =

Topological space

In the mathematical field of topology, there are various notions of a P-space and of a p-space.

== Generic use ==
The expression P-space might be used generically to denote a topological space satisfying some given and previously introduced topological invariant P. This might apply also to spaces of a different kind, i.e. non-topological spaces with additional structure.

== P-spaces in the sense of Gillman–Henriksen ==
A P-space in the sense of Gillman–Henriksen is a topological space in which every countable intersection of open sets is open. An equivalent condition is that countable unions of closed sets are closed. In other words, G_{δ} sets are open and F_{σ} sets are closed. The letter P stands for both pseudo-discrete and prime. Gillman and Henriksen also define a P-point as a point at which any prime ideal of the ring of real-valued continuous functions is maximal, and a P-space is a space in which every point is a P-point.

Different authors restrict their attention to topological spaces that satisfy various separation axioms. With the right axioms, one may characterize P-spaces in terms of their rings of continuous real-valued functions.

Special kinds of P-spaces include Alexandrov-discrete spaces, in which arbitrary intersections of open sets are open. These in turn include locally finite spaces, which include finite spaces and discrete spaces.

== P-spaces in the sense of Morita ==
A different notion of a P-space has been introduced by Kiiti Morita in 1964, in connection with his (now solved) conjectures (see the relevant entry for more information). Spaces satisfying the covering property introduced by Morita are sometimes also called Morita P-spaces or normal P-spaces.

== p-spaces ==
A notion of a p-space has been introduced by Alexander Arhangelskii.
