= Flight 30 =

Flight 30 may refer to:

- World Airways Flight 30, crashed on 23 January 1982
- Qantas Flight 30, suffered damage on 25 July 2008
