= Thomas Keys Residence =

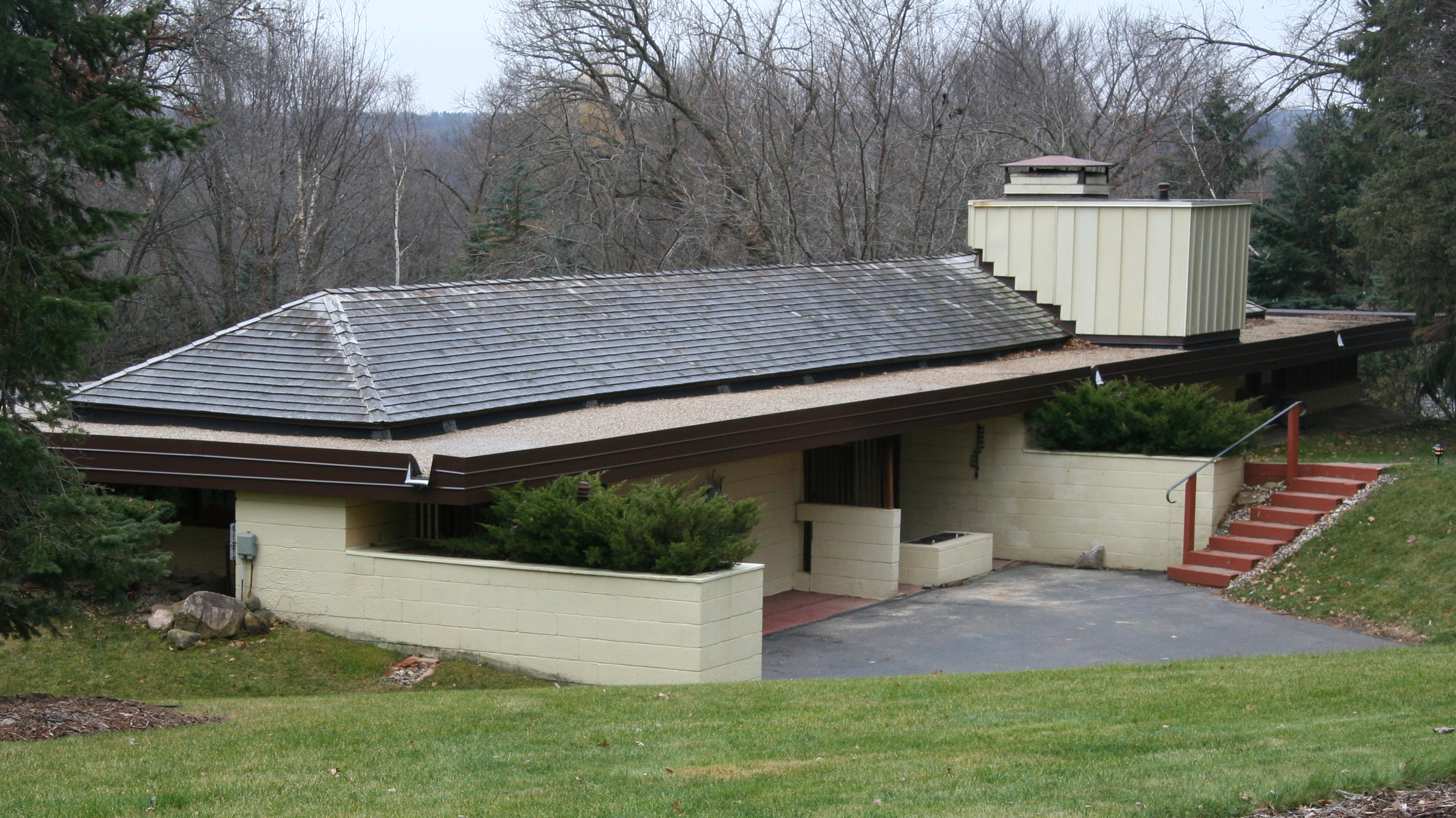

- Location within Minnesota
- Interactive map showing Keys’ Residence location

General information
- Type: House
- Architectural style: Usonian
- Location: Rochester, Minnesota
- Coordinates: 44.00755°N 92.48758°W
- Construction started: 1950

Design and construction
- Architect: Frank Lloyd Wright

The Thomas E. Keys Residence is a house in Rochester, Minnesota designed by Frank Lloyd Wright and built with earth berms in 1950. The design is based on a previous Wright design for a cooperative in Detroit, Michigan, which never materialized due to the onset of World War II. The house is an example of Wright's Usonian genre of architecture, a style he envisioned to meet the needs of middle-class families desiring a more refined architecture for their homes. The home had three bedrooms and one bathroom, and is constructed with concrete block. It is based on a square module of four feet on a side. Architect (and former Wright apprentice) John H. "Jack" Howe converted the home's carport into a guest bedroom and bath in 1970.

The house is located at 1217 Skyline Dr SW, a short distance from two other Wright designs, the A. H. Bulbulian Residence and the James McBean Residence.

== See also ==
- List of Frank Lloyd Wright works
