= Qantas Flight 30 =

2008 aviation accident over the South China Sea

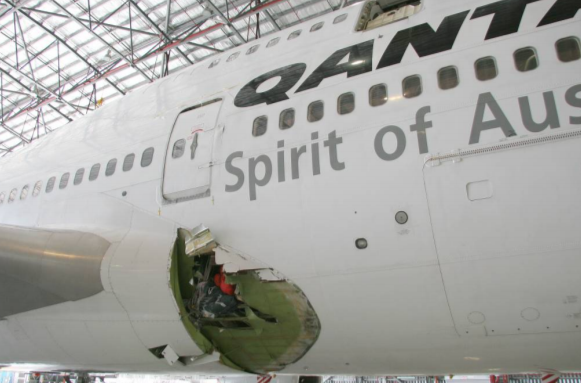
- The damage to the aircraft

Accident
- Date: 25 July 2008
- Summary: In-flight explosion leading to structural damage Rapid decompression
- Site: South China Sea west of Luzon, Philippines; 14.510°N 121.022°E

Aircraft
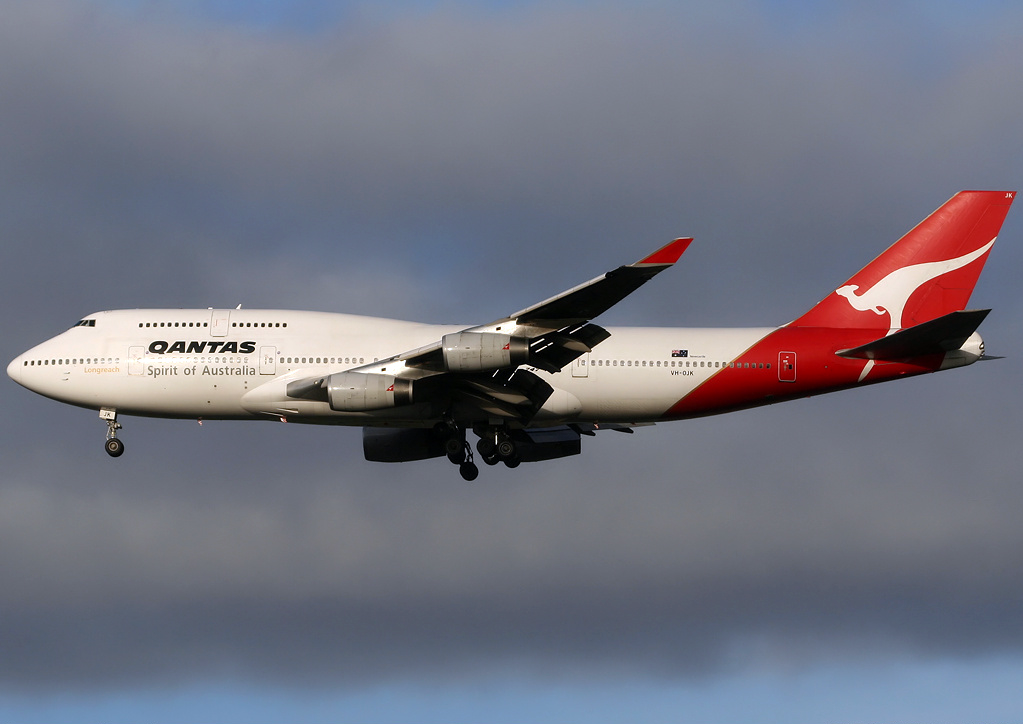
- VH-OJK, the aircraft involved in the accident, pictured in 2007
- Aircraft type: Boeing 747-438
- Aircraft name: City of Newcastle
- Operator: Qantas
- IATA flight No.: QF30
- ICAO flight No.: QFA30
- Call sign: QANTAS 30
- Registration: VH-OJK
- Flight origin: London Heathrow Airport
- Stopover: Hong Kong International Airport
- Destination: Melbourne Airport
- Occupants: 365
- Passengers: 346
- Crew: 19
- Fatalities: 0
- Injuries: 0
- Survivors: 365

Qantas Flight 30 was a scheduled flight from London Heathrow to Melbourne with a stopover in Hong Kong on 25 July 2008, operated by Qantas on a Boeing 747-400. The flight was interrupted on the Hong Kong to Melbourne leg by an exploding oxygen tank that ruptured the fuselage just forward of the starboard wing root. 53-year-old Captain John Bartels (who had flown for Qantas for 25 years and the Royal Australian Navy for 7 years) and his co-pilots, Bernd Werninghaus and Paul Tabac, made an emergency descent to a breathable altitude of about 10,000 feet (3,048 m) and diverted to Ninoy Aquino International Airport, Metro Manila, Philippines. There were no injuries.

== Aircraft ==
The aircraft involved was a Boeing 747-438, MSN 25067, registered as VH-OJK. It was delivered to Qantas in June 1991 and was equipped with four Rolls-Royce RB211-524G2 engines.

== In-flight accident ==
The flight left Hong Kong on 25 July 2008 shortly after 9:00 am HKT (0100 UTC). At 10:17 HKT (0217 UTC), passengers and crew heard a loud bang; the cabin depressurised and a hole in the floor of the passenger deck appeared, as well as a hole in the outside wall of the cargo deck. During the emergency, parts of the aircraft's floor and ceiling collapsed. Passengers reported that, despite the noise and the deployment of the oxygen masks, there was very little panic. The pilots conducted an emergency descent from 29,000 feet (8,839 m) to ensure adequate oxygen supply for the passengers, reaching 10,000 feet (3,048 m) by 10:24 HKT (02:24 UTC).

After the accident, four passengers said that their oxygen masks did not deploy, whilst others had deteriorated elastic. It was stated that these passengers were deprived of oxygen until the plane had descended to a breathable altitude. The Australian Transport Safety Bureau interviewed passengers who reported problems with the oxygen masks as part of their investigation.

The hole in the fuselage – roughly in an inverted T-shape – was up to 2.01 metres (6 ft 7 in) wide and approximately 1.52 metres (5 ft 0 in) high, located on the right side of the fuselage, below cabin floor level and immediately forward of the wing. The wing-fuselage fairing was missing, revealing some palletised cargo in the hold. However, the freight forwarder reported that all items on the manifest were accounted for. Other than some items which were located near the cylinder and resulting hole, no other cargo or baggage on the flight was damaged.

There were no injuries. A few passengers reportedly displayed signs of nausea upon exiting the aircraft.

== Investigation ==
The Australian Transport Safety Bureau (ATSB) led the investigation, sending four investigators to Manila to conduct a detailed inspection of the aircraft, with Qantas, the US Federal Aviation Administration, Boeing, the Australian Civil Aviation Safety Authority and the Philippines Civil Aviation Authority also involved.

Soon after the accident, the ATSB announced that air safety investigators found that an oxygen cylinder which was located in the area of the explosion had not been accounted for, but that it was too early to say that an oxygen cylinder could be the cause of the mid-air explosion on QF30. Regardless, the Civil Aviation Safety Authority ordered Qantas to inspect all of its oxygen cylinders and brackets which hold the cylinders on its Boeing 747 fleet. The valve and mounting brackets were found, but not the bottle, number four of thirteen fitted in that bank. A senior investigator, Neville Blyth, reported that the cylinder valve was found inside the cabin, having punched a hole "at least twenty centimetres in diameter" through the cabin floor.

Blyth said that the flight recorders were to be analysed in the Canberra laboratories of the ATSB. However, because the plane had remained airborne and operational throughout the incident, the cockpit voice recorder does not contain records of the initial event itself; its two-hour memory had been overwritten with recordings taking place after this event, during the diversion and landing. The twenty-four-hour flight data recorder does contain data covering the entire incident.

On 29 August, the ATSB gave an update confirming further aspects of the initial investigation. They stated that these initial investigations had found that the aircraft took about five and a half minutes to descend from the decompression event at 29,000 feet to the altitude of 10,000 feet and that it appeared that part of an oxygen cylinder and its valve had entered the passenger cabin, then impacted with the number 2 right door handle, turning it part way. The ATSB noted that there was no risk of the door being opened by this movement, with the door systems performing as designed. All three of the aircraft's instrument landing systems as well as the anti-skid braking system were unavailable for the landing; the pilots subsequently landed the aircraft without using those systems. Most of the oxygen masks deployed in the incident, with 426 out of the 476 deployed being activated by the 346 passengers, pulling them down to activate the flow of oxygen.

=== Preliminary findings ===
The cause of the accident was an exploding oxygen tank in the cargo area, according to a preliminary finding by the ATSB:

Inspection of the aircraft by the operator's personnel and Australian Transport Safety Bureau (ATSB) investigators, revealed a rupture in the lower right side of the fuselage, immediately beneath the wing leading edge-to-fuselage transition fairing. The rupture extended for approximately 2 metres along the length of the aircraft and 1.5 metres vertically. It was evident that one passenger oxygen cylinder (number-4 from a bank of seven cylinders along the right side of the cargo hold) had sustained a sudden failure and forceful discharge of its pressurised contents, rupturing the fuselage and propelling the cylinder upward, puncturing the cabin floor and entering the cabin adjacent to the second main cabin door. The cylinder had impacted the door frame, door handle and overhead panelling, before presumably falling to the cabin floor and exiting the aircraft through the ruptured fuselage, as the cylinder was not located within the aircraft.

=== Other safety concerns ===
Some oxygen masks that were deployed after the blast failed to function properly. Some passengers were forced to share a mask when the plane depressurised, while others panicked when some masks failed to deploy. The FAA had recently issued airworthiness directives regarding problems with the masks on this and several other Boeing commercial aircraft models.

The ATSB issued two Safety Advisory Notices, advising responsible organisations to review procedures, equipment, techniques and personnel qualifications for maintenance, inspection and handling of aviation oxygen cylinders.

=== ATSB final report ===
Just over two years after the incident, the final report of the event was released on 22 November 2010.

From the summary released by the ATSB:

"On 25 July 2008, a Boeing Company 747-438 aircraft carrying 369 passengers and crew rapidly depressurised following the forceful rupture of one of the aircraft's emergency oxygen cylinders in the forward cargo hold. The aircraft was cruising at 29,000 ft and was 55 minutes into a flight between Hong Kong and Melbourne."

"Following an emergency descent to 10,000 ft, the flight crew diverted the aircraft to Ninoy Aquino International Airport, Manila, Philippines, where it landed safely. None of the passengers or crew sustained any physical injury."

"A team of investigators, led by the Australian Transport Safety Bureau (ATSB) and including representatives from the US National Transportation Safety Board (NTSB), the US Federal Aviation Authority (FAA), Boeing and the Civil Aviation Authority of the Philippines (CAAP) examined the aircraft on the ground in Manila. From that work, it was evident that the oxygen cylinder (number-4 in a bank along the right side of the forward cargo hold) had burst in such a way as to rupture the adjacent fuselage wall and be propelled upwards; puncturing the cabin floor and impacting the frame and handle of the R2 door and the overhead cabin panelling. No part of the cylinder (other than the valve assembly) was recovered and it was presumed lost from the aircraft during the depressurisation."

"The ATSB undertook a close and detailed study of the cylinder type, including a review of all possible failure scenarios and an engineering evaluation of other cylinders from the same production batch and of the type in general. It was evident that the cylinder had failed by bursting through, or around the base – allowing the release of pressurised contents to project it vertically upwards. While it was hypothesised that the cylinder may have contained a defect or flaw, or been damaged in a way that promoted failure, there was no evidence found to support such a finding. Nor was there any evidence found to suggest the cylinders from the subject production batch, or the type in general, were in any way predisposed to premature failure."

== Repairs ==
Repairs to the aircraft were conducted in Manila by Boeing. It was ferried to Avalon on 10 November 2008. The original captain and first officer were part of the ferry crew. The only work that remained to be done at that point was replacement of the carpets and seat covers. On 18 November 2008, with all work complete, the aircraft was damaged again when another Qantas Boeing 747 collided with it at Avalon.
