= Morita conjectures =

The Morita conjectures in general topology are certain problems about normal spaces, now solved in the affirmative. The conjectures, formulated by Kiiti Morita in 1976, ask

1. If $X \times Y$ is normal for every normal space Y, is X a discrete space?
2. If $X \times Y$ is normal for every normal P-space Y, is X metrizable?
3. If $X \times Y$ is normal for every normal countably paracompact space Y, is X metrizable and sigma-locally compact?

The answers were believed to be affirmative. Here a normal P-space Y is characterised by the property that the product with every metrizable X is normal; thus the conjecture was that the converse holds.

Keiko Chiba, Teodor C. Przymusiński, and Mary Ellen Rudin proved conjecture (1) and showed that conjectures (2) and (3) cannot be proven false under the standard ZFC axioms for mathematics (specifically, that the conjectures hold under the axiom of constructibility V=L).

Fifteen years later, Zoltán Tibor Balogh succeeded in showing that conjectures (2) and (3) are true.
