= Nikiel's conjecture =

In mathematics, Nikiel's conjecture in general topology was a conjectural characterization of the continuous image of a compact total order. The conjecture was first formulated by Jacek Nikiel in 1986. The conjecture was proven by Mary Ellen Rudin in 1999.

The conjecture states that a compact topological space is the continuous image of a total order if and only if it is a monotonically normal space.
