= EgyptAir Flight 667 =

2011 aviation accident in Egypt

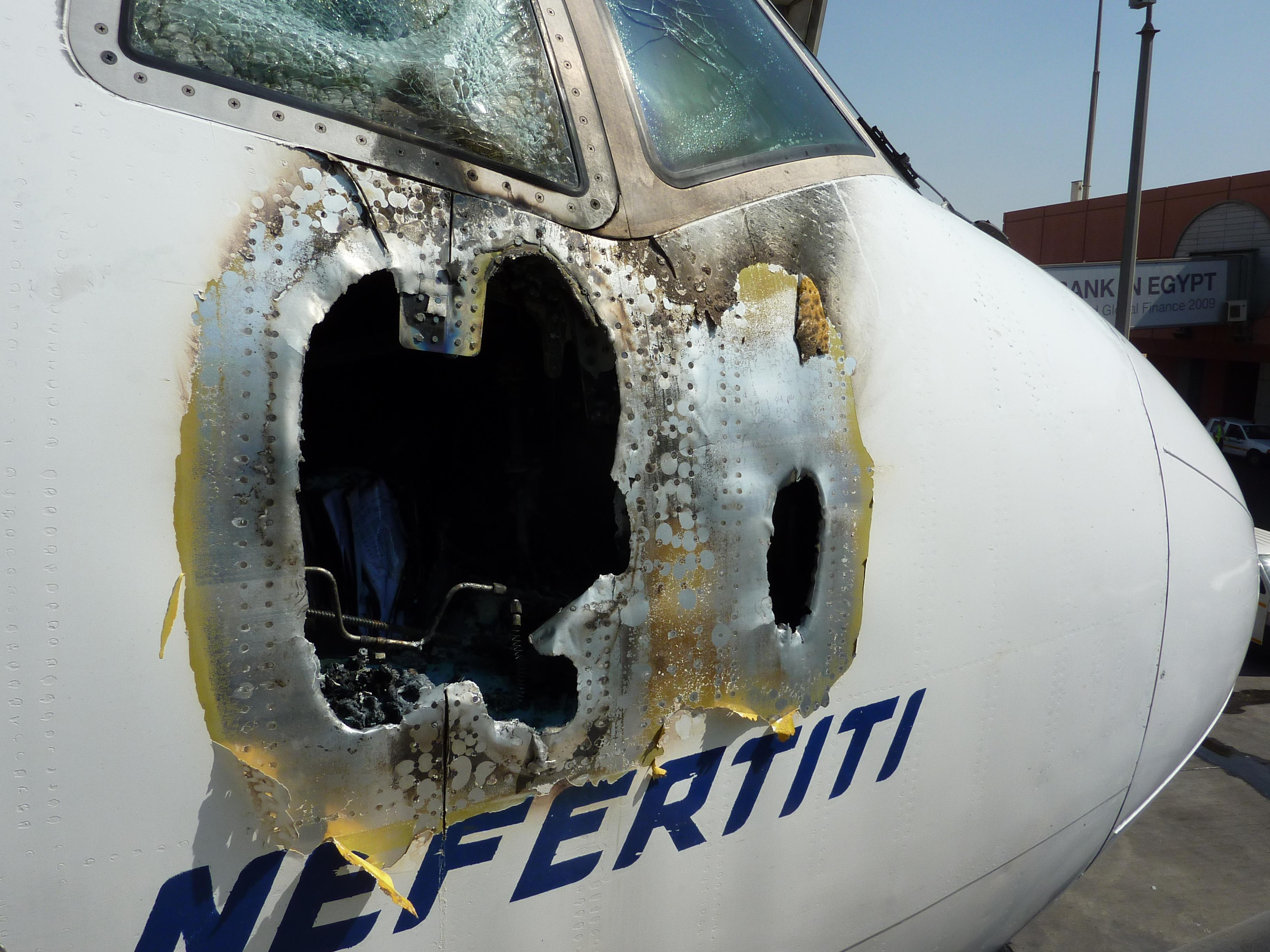
- The melted nose of the aircraft after the fire

Accident
- Date: 29 July 2011
- Summary: Cockpit fire on ground
- Site: Cairo International Airport, Cairo, Egypt; 30°07′N 31°24′E
- Total injuries: 7

Aircraft
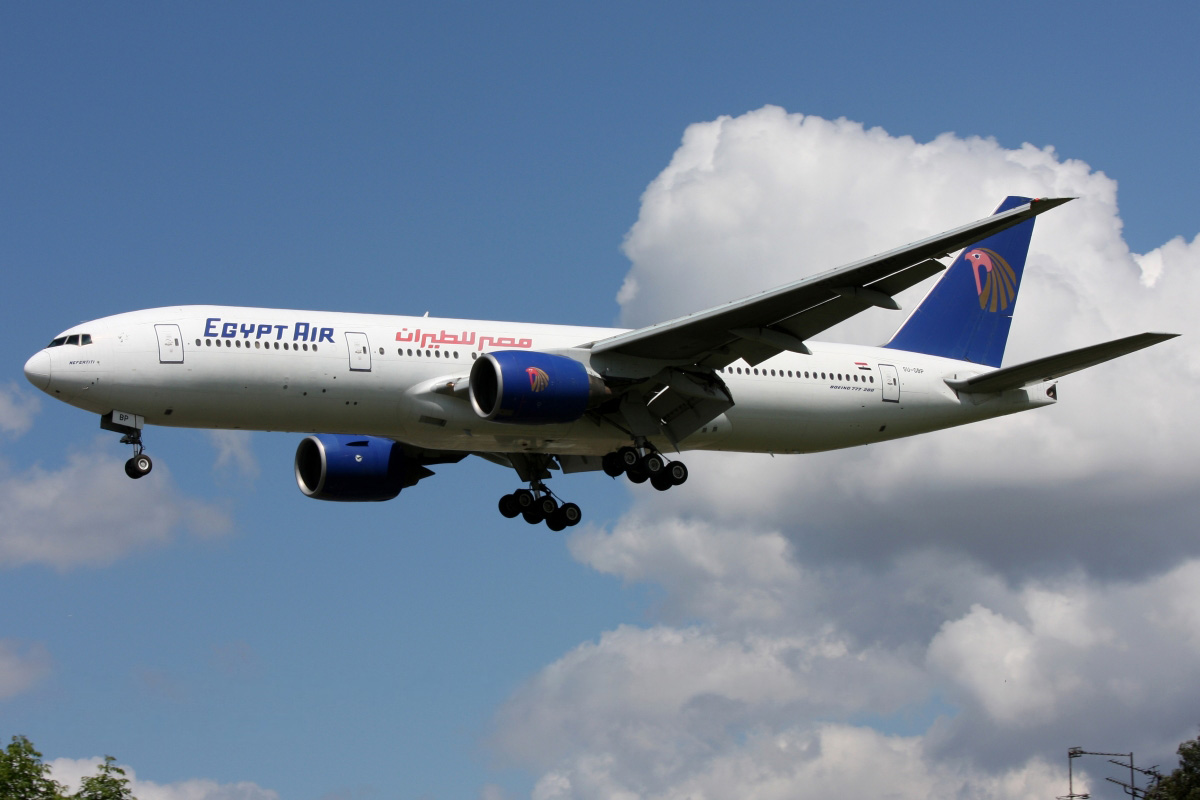
- SU-GBP, the aircraft involved in the accident, pictured in 2009
- Aircraft type: Boeing 777-266ER
- Aircraft name: Nefertiti
- Operator: EgyptAir
- IATA flight No.: MS667
- ICAO flight No.: MSR667
- Call sign: EGYPTAIR 667
- Registration: SU-GBP
- Flight origin: Cairo International Airport, Cairo, Egypt
- Destination: King Abdulaziz International Airport, Jeddah, Saudi Arabia
- Occupants: 317
- Passengers: 307
- Crew: 10
- Fatalities: 0
- Injuries: 5
- Survivors: 317

Ground casualties
- Ground injuries: 2

On 29 July 2011, a Boeing 777 on a scheduled passenger flight from Cairo, Egypt, to Jeddah, Saudi Arabia, flying as Egyptair Flight 667, suffered a cockpit fire on the ground at Cairo Airport, while preparing to depart. There were no fatalities, but seven people were treated for smoke inhalation. The aircraft was damaged beyond economic repair.

The subsequent investigation found that the fire had originated in the crew's emergency oxygen system storage area, but was unable to conclusively determine the source of ignition, nor the cause of the oxygen leak that fuelled the fire.

== Accident ==
The EgyptAir Boeing 777 was parked at gate F7 of Terminal 3 at Cairo airport on 29 July 2011, with preparations underway to operate flight 667. As the last few of the 307 passengers were boarding, the flight crew in the cockpit heard a bang and a hissing sound coming from the right side console, immediately followed by smoke and flames. The first officer jumped out of his seat and was ordered by the captain to leave the cockpit, while the captain unsuccessfully attempted to put out the fire using the on-board fire extinguisher.

According to the cockpit voice recorder, noises occur at 9:11:38 that the final report characterizes as "a pop is heard, followed by a hissing sound similar to the escape of pressurized gas". Three seconds later, the captain instructs the first officer to "get up, get out now." Twenty-one seconds later, the captain says "fire, fire, call for fire". The fire erupted about 30 minutes after the first officer performed a test of the oxygen mask's function during the standard pre-flight checklist. The passengers were immediately evacuated through the two connected jet bridges.

Airport fire crews arrived on the scene about three minutes after the alarm was raised and quickly extinguished the fire. Two firefighters and five passengers and crew were hospitalized for smoke inhalation.

The aircraft was subsequently written off, having sustained severe structural damage in the cockpit area as well as extensive heat and smoke damage in the cabin. This was the second hull loss of a Boeing 777 after British Airways Flight 38.

== Background ==
=== Aircraft ===
The aircraft involved was a Boeing 777-266ER named Nefertiti, registered as SU-GBP with serial number 28423 (line number 71). It was manufactured by Boeing Commercial Airplanes in 1997 and in its 14 years of service, it had accumulated 48,281 hours and 27 minutes of flight time in 11,448 flight cycles.

=== Crew ===
The captain was a 49-year-old who had logged 16982 hours and 37 minutes of flying time, 5314 hours and 22 minutes of which were logged on the Boeing 777. His co-pilot was a 25-year-old who had logged 2247 hours and 1 minute of flying time, including 198 hours and 10 minutes logged on the Boeing 777.

== Investigation ==
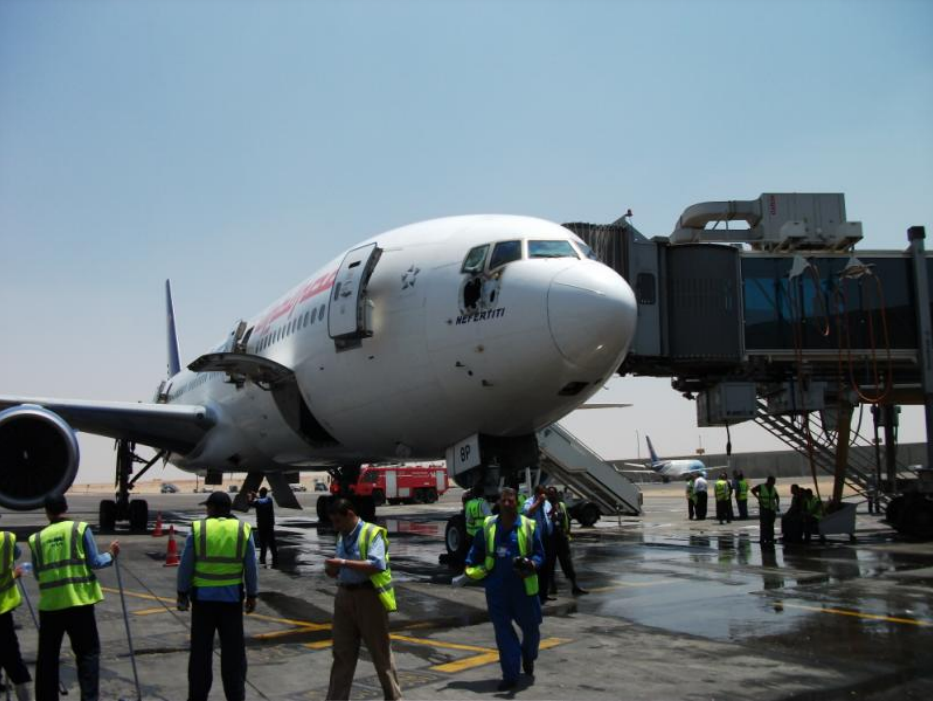
Another view of the aftermath

Since the area where the fire originated has no fuel lines, oil lines, or hydraulic lines, the investigation focused on the crew oxygen supply system as the root cause or a major contributing factor. In the days after the fire, the area of the cockpit where the fire originated on SU-GBP was examined on all EgyptAir 777-200 and 777-300 aircraft. According to the investigation's final report, the wiring found in the oxygen light plate did not match the original Boeing design:

The 777-200 aircraft were found to differ from Boeing’s current design. In particular, the wiring to the first officer’s oxygen mask light plate differed in the follow aspects: a wire clamp was missing, the wiring was not sleeved, and a large loop of unsupported wire was found. All of EgyptAir’s 777-200 had a similar wiring configuration at the first officer’s oxygen mask location. The captain’s side wiring was similar, except that sleeving was present on all airplanes inspected. ... On one of the 777-200 aircraft, the outer layer of wiring insulation was found damaged, although the inner layer was intact and the conductor was not exposed.

The reason for the missing clamps could not be determined. Approximately 380 early 777 aircraft did not have sleeves on the wire in the oxygen light. Boeing issued a service bulletin in October 2011 recommending that the oxygen light plate wiring be inspected and, if necessary, have sleeving installed and damaged wires replaced.

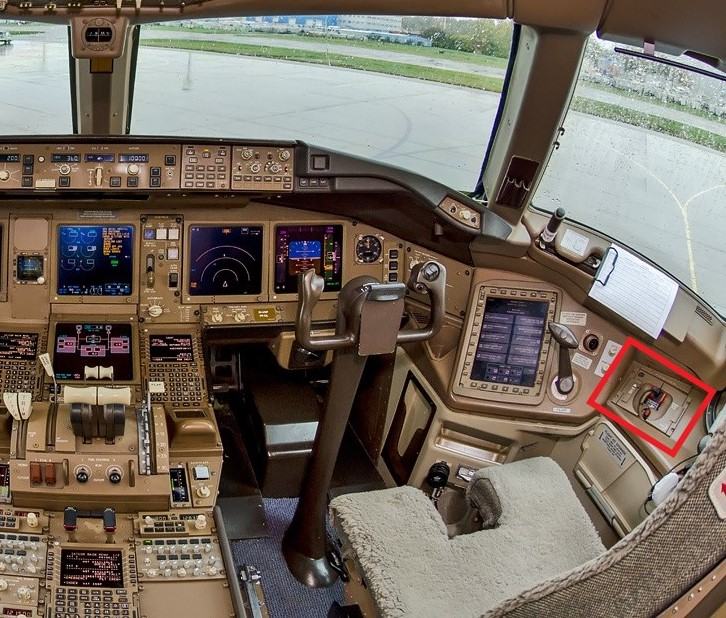
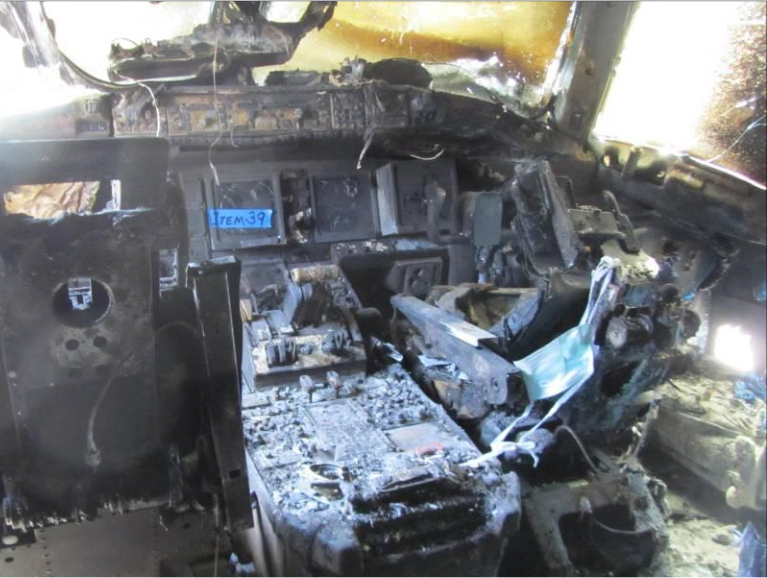
A Boeing 777 cockpit (left), with the location of the first officer's oxygen mask circled in red, and the cockpit of SU-GBP after the fire

Previous testing by the US National Transportation Safety Board following a 2008 cockpit fire on a Boeing 767 had found that flexible oxygen supply hoses could ignite if anti-kink springs along the oxygen supply hose were exposed to an electric current. The hoses in SU-GBP were composed of two layers of silicone with the spring embedded in the outer layer, unlike the hose in the NTSB tests. Testing performed by Boeing on 777 crew oxygen hoses found two of the seven tested to be conductive. Further testing in conditions that increased the likelihood of ignition showed that 5 volts of direct current was not sufficient to destroy the hose. However, the final report notes that these tests were conducted on new hoses and that Boeing planned to conduct similar tests on older hoses from in-service aircraft to see if any age-related changes could have affected the results.

The same test was also performed at voltages and amperage of aircraft wiring found elsewhere in the cockpit. With air in the hose, applying 28 volts DC power at 5 amps of current or 115 volts AC power at 2.5 amps did not rupture the hose or cause ignition, but 28 V DC at 6 amps or 115 V AC at 5 amps resulted in a small leak with "some incandescence". With oxygen in the tube, 5 V DC at 1.2 amps or 28 V DC at 2.5 amps did not result in a rupture, but 28 V DC at 5 amps caused a leak "followed by ignition and complete rupture of hose [sic]." Boeing examined the design of the oxygen supply to determine possible sources of electricity:

With the exception of the oxygen mask microphone wire (which was found to carry only milliamp level signal currents), all of the wiring in the area of the captain's and first officer's oxygen system followed the design requirements for separation. However, it was determined that contact between aircraft wiring and oxygen system components may be possible if multiple wire clamps are missing or fractured or if wires are incorrectly installed.

Adiabatic heating from the sudden release of pressurized oxygen into the hose was another possible source of ignition, but ruled out. Window grease in an oxygen-rich environment was another source of ignition that was investigated, but testing determined that the oxygen level did not impact the flashpoint, which was over 200 °F above the maximum theoretical temperature in that part of the cockpit.

The investigation did not conclusively determine the cause of the fire, only that the fire originated near the first officer's oxygen mask supply tubing and that oxygen from the first officer's supply mask "is suspected to have contributed to the fire's intensity and speed", although it is not known whether a breach of the oxygen system provided a flammable environment for the fire to start or whether the oxygen system breached as a result of the fire, and an electrical fault, possibly in anti-kink springs in flexible oxygen supply hoses, may have caused the fire.
