= Zoltán Tibor Balogh =

Hungarian mathematician

Zoltán "Zoli" Tibor Balogh (December 7, 1953 – June 19, 2002) was a Hungarian-born mathematician, specializing in set-theoretic topology. His father, Tibor Balogh, was also a mathematician. His best-known work concerned solutions to problems involving normality of products, most notably the first ZFC construction of a small (cardinality continuum) Dowker space. He also solved Nagami's problem (normal + screenable does not imply paracompact), and the second and third Morita conjectures about normality in products.
