= Emergency oxygen system =

System for providing oxygen in an aircraft during an emergency

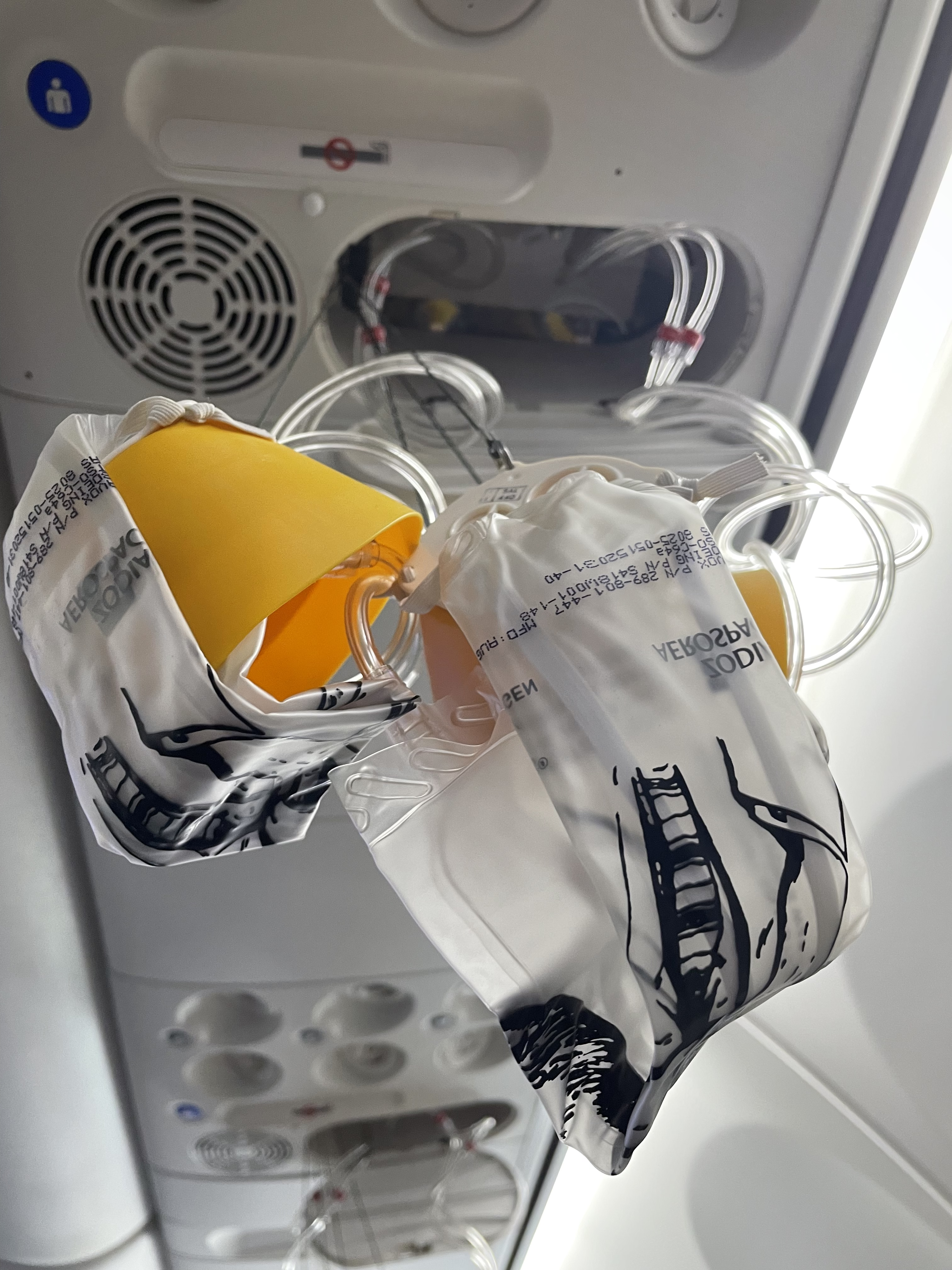
Deployed oxygen masks

Aircraft emergency oxygen systems are equipment fitted to pressurized commercial aircraft, intended for use after a loss of cabin pressurization causing the cabin altitude to rise above a safe level. A system consists of individual oxygen masks stored in compartments near passenger seats and in areas such as lavatories and galleys, together with an oxygen source such as a centralized gaseous cylinder or decentralized chemical generators.

== Use ==
Most commercial aircraft that operate at high altitudes are pressurized to a maximum cabin altitude of 8,000 feet (2,400 m) or lower. If cabin pressurization is lost while an aircraft is flying above approximately 14,000 feet (4,300 m), passenger oxygen masks are normally released automatically from compartments above the seats.

Pre-flight safety demonstrations and aircraft safety cards explain the location and use of passenger oxygen masks.

An oxygen mask typically consists of a soft silicone facial cup, often colored yellow, with elastic straps for securing it to the passenger's face and a tube connecting it to the aircraft's oxygen supply. When the masks deploy, they are attached to tethers that allow them to hang in front of the passengers. On most aircraft, when the passenger pulls the mask toward them, the tether removes a pin, activating the flow of oxygen.

Some oxygen masks are equipped with a rebreather bag or reservoir bag between the mask and the oxygen supply. The bag may not inflate continuously, or may not inflate at all, depending on the aircraft's oxygen system and the passenger's breathing rate. This can lead passengers to mistakenly believe that the mask is not providing oxygen. Safety demonstrations and safety cards therefore explain that the bag may not inflate and that passengers should continue breathing normally through the mask.

Passenger oxygen systems are intended to provide oxygen for the period required for the flight crew to descend the aircraft to an altitude where supplemental oxygen is no longer required. Following a loss of cabin pressurization at high altitude, the flight crew performs an emergency descent while passengers use the oxygen masks. Passengers are generally instructed to remain seated and keep their masks on until the crew announces that it is safe to remove them.

Some aircraft, including the Saab 340, Saab 2000, and Beechcraft 1900D, use oxygen masks that are stored under the seats or distributed by flight attendants. These masks are removed from their packaging and connected to oxygen outlets when needed.

Passenger oxygen masks may also deploy unintentionally if a mask panel becomes dislodged, such as during severe turbulence or a hard landing.

Passenger oxygen systems are also provided in areas of the aircraft where passengers may be present outside their seats, including lavatories and galleys. Rows of seats typically have at least one more mask than the number of seats to accommodate situations such as an infant being held by a passenger.

Cockpit crew members generally use more substantial oxygen masks supplied by a gaseous cylinder. Flight attendants typically have access to portable gaseous oxygen cylinders that can be worn over the shoulder, allowing them to move through the cabin to assist passengers.

These emergency oxygen systems are not a substitute for medically necessary oxygen therapy.

== Mechanism ==
Diagram of a chemical oxygen generator system

There are currently three systems that are typically found on aircraft:

- A chemical oxygen generator system connected to all masks in the compartment. Pulling down on one oxygen mask triggers the firing pin, igniting a mixture of sodium chlorate and iron powder, generating the oxygen supply for all the masks in the compartment. Oxygen production cannot be shut off once a mask is pulled, and typically lasts at least 15 minutes, sufficient for the plane to descend to a safe altitude for breathing without supplemental oxygen. The generator becomes extremely hot during operation, and a burning smell may be noticeable in the cabin. This is a normal consequence of the chemical reaction. Chemical oxygen generators are used on most commercial aircraft because of the weight and maintenance considerations associated with carrying a large supply of compressed oxygen.
- A gaseous manifold system, connects oxygen masks to a central gas cylinder. The supply is distributed through a manifold to the masks. Pulling down on a mask opens a valve, allowing oxygen to begin flowing to that mask.
- A decentralized gaseous system, often called a pulse oxygen system, has separate high-pressure gas cylinders supplying the masks in each compartment. Such systems are used on some modern aircraft, including the Boeing 787. Unlike the other system types that provide a continuous flow of oxygen, these systems deliver small pulses of oxygen, in response to the passenger's inhalation and do not require a reservoir bag.

== Dangers ==
EgyptAir Flight 667 cabin fire

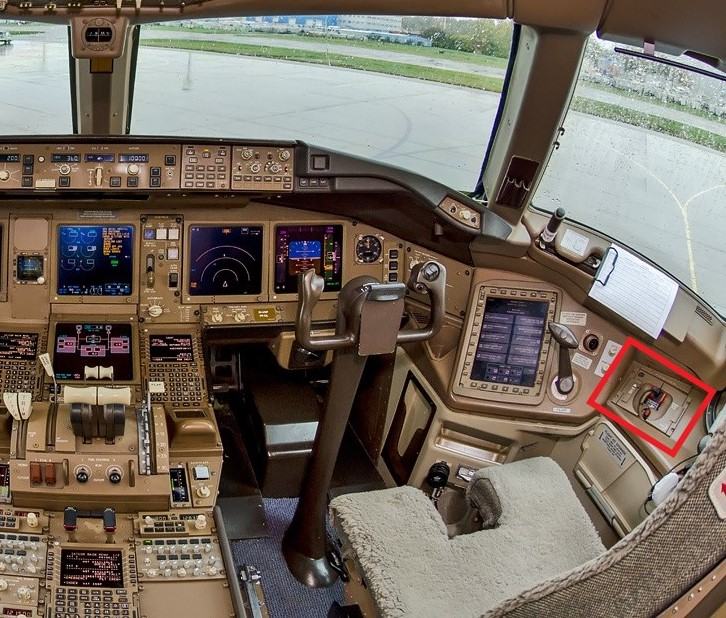
A 777-300 cockpit highlighting oxygen supply mask location

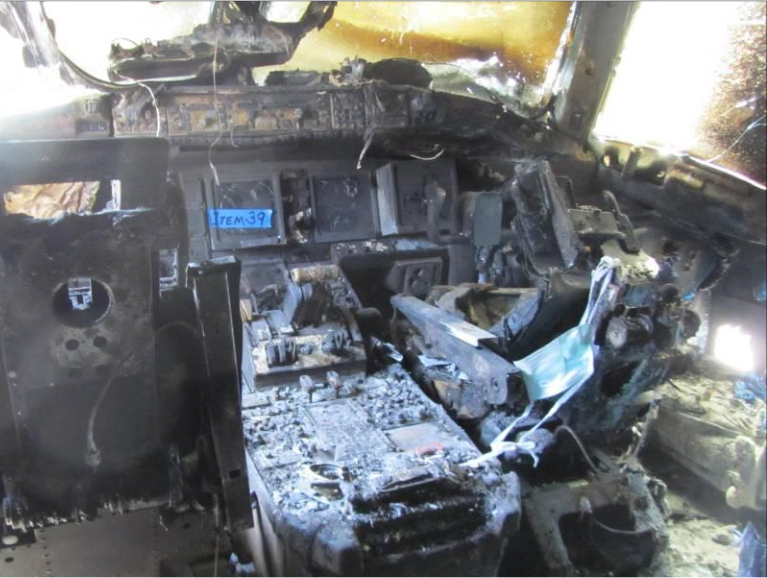
EgyptAir Flight 667 cockpit post-fire

Combustion is the exothermic chemical reaction between oxygen and a fuel, producing a flame and smoke. Because an oxidiser is necessary for a fire, oxygen-generating equipment on aircraft pose a significant fire hazard and have contributed to several aircraft fires, both on the ground and while in flight.

=== Incidents ===
Aircraft accidents and incidents related to oxygen supply systems include:

- ValuJet Flight 592 (1996) - Expired chemical oxygen generators were improperly prepared and labelled as company material and without being designated as HAZMAT and placed in the cargo hold of a passenger aircraft, where they caught fire in flight resulting in a crash that killed all 110 persons onboard.
- ABX Air Flight 1611 (2008) - Cockpit fire in a Boeing 767 on the ground before departure caused by an unexpected electric current in the anti-kink spring a pilot's oxygen mask hose to ignite the hose in the presence of oxygen inside the hose that remained from pre-flight checks, although there was no indication that the oxygen supply was breached and began feeding the fire; both pilots safely evacuated the cockpit, but the aircraft was declared a total loss.
- Qantas Flight 30 (2008) - According to the final report, "one passenger oxygen cylinder...had sustained a sudden failure and forceful discharge of its pressurised contents into the aircraft hold, rupturing the fuselage in the vicinity of the wing-fuselage leading edge fairing. The cylinder had been propelled upward by the force of the discharge, puncturing the cabin floor and entering the cabin adjacent to the second main cabin door. The cylinder had subsequently impacted the door frame, door handle and overhead panelling, before falling to the cabin floor and exiting the aircraft through the ruptured fuselage." There were no fatalities.
- EgyptAir Flight 667 (2011) - Fire which began around the first officer's oxygen supply while the aircraft was boarding passengers, possibly due to a breach and sudden release of oxygen into the mask ignited by an electrical fault in the mask hose; no fatalities, but the aircraft was declared a total loss.
