= Clifford Hugh Dowker =

Canadian topologist (1912–1982)

Clifford Dowker
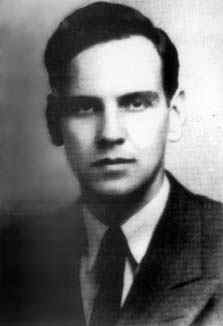
- Dowker c. 1930s
- Born: Clifford Hugh Dowker; 2 March 1912; Western Ontario, Canada
- Died: 14 October 1982 (aged 70); London, England
- Education: University of Western Ontario (BA, MA); Princeton University (PhD)
- Known for: Dowker space; Dowker insertion theorem; Dowker notation; Dowker-Thistlethwaite algorithm
- Partner: Yael Naim (m. 1944 - 1982)
- Scientific career
- Fields: Knot theory; Mathematics
- Thesis: Mapping Theorems for Non-Compact Spaces (1938)
- Doctoral advisor: Solomon Lefschetz

Clifford Hugh Dowker (/ˈdaʊkər/; March 2, 1912 – October 14, 1982) was a topologist known for his work in general topology and also for his contributions in category theory, sheaf theory and knot theory.

== Biography ==
Clifford Hugh Dowker grew up on a small farm in Western Ontario, Canada. He excelled in mathematics and was paid to teach his math teacher math at his secondary school. He was awarded a scholarship at the University of Western Ontario, where he got his B.Sc. in 1933. He wanted to pursue a career as a teacher, but he was persuaded to continue with his education because of his extraordinary mathematical talent. He earned his M.A. from the University of Toronto in 1936 and his Ph.D. from Princeton University in 1938. His dissertation Mapping theorems in non-compact spaces was written under the supervision of Solomon Lefschetz and was published (with additions) in 1947 in the American Journal of Mathematics. After earning his doctorate, Dowker became an instructor at the University of Western Ontario for a year. The next year, he worked as an assistant back at Princeton under John von Neumann. During World War II, he worked for the U.S. Air Force, calculating the trajectories of projectiles. He married Yael Naim in 1944. After the war, he was appointed associate professor at the Tufts University. Because of Senator Joseph McCarthy's red scare, he decided to take his family to England shortly thereafter, where he was appointed Reader in applied mathematics at Birkbeck College in 1951. In 1962 he was granted a personal chair, until he retired in 1979. The last years of his life were marked by a long illness, yet he continued working, developing Dowker notation in the weeks before his death.

== Work ==
Dowker showed that Čech and Vietoris homology groups coincide. Along with Morwen Thistlethwaite, he developed Dowker notation, a simple way of describing knots, suitable for computers.

In an article published in 1951, Dowker introduced the concept of countably paracompact spaces. In the same article, Dowker conjectured that so-called Dowker spaces could not exist. This conjecture was ultimately proven false by Mary Ellen Rudin in 1971.

== See also ==
- Dowker notation
- Dowker space
- Čech cohomology
- Morwen Thistlethwaite
- Sheaf theory
