= Walter Rudin House =

House in Madison, Wisconsin

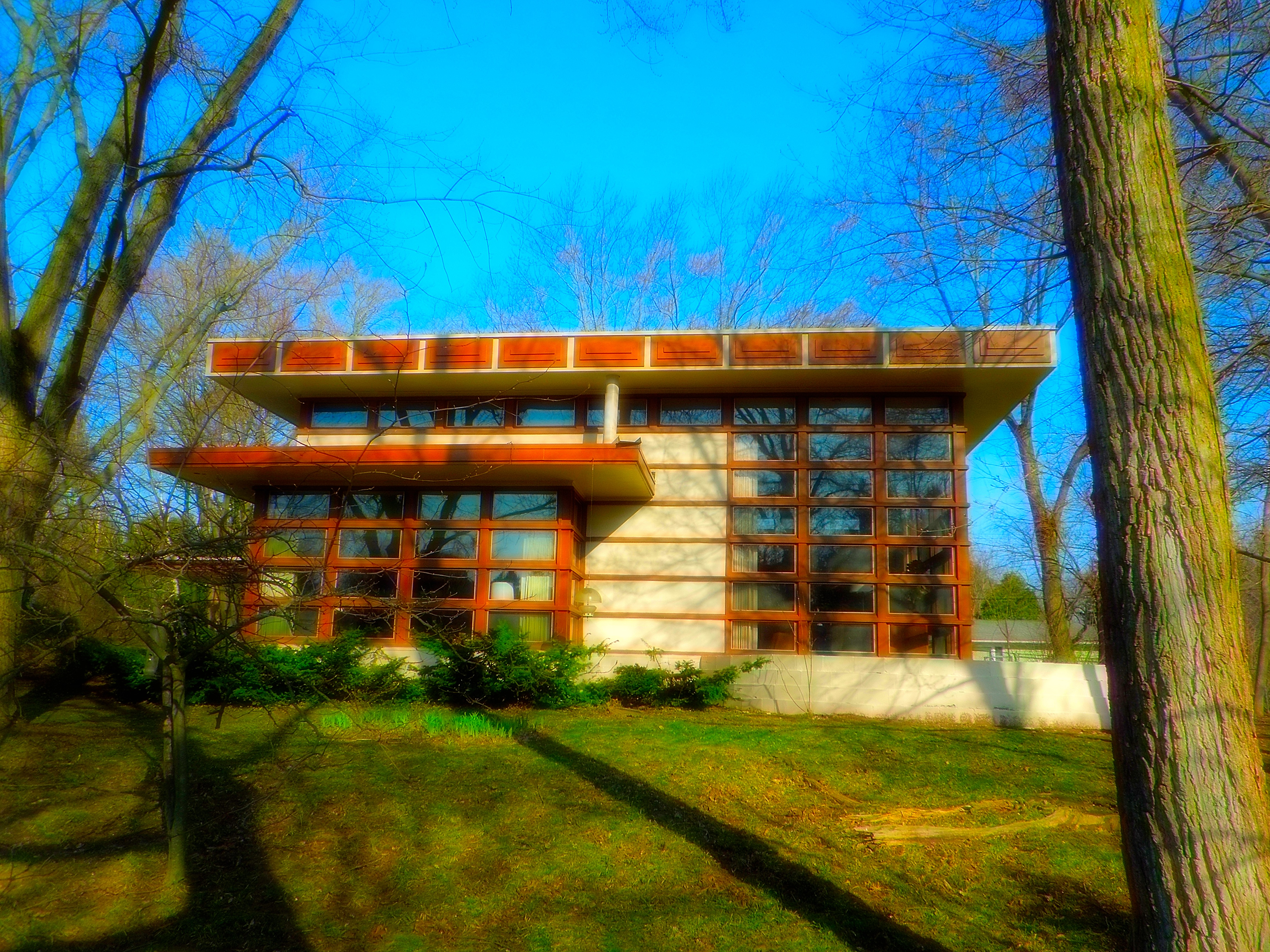
- The Walter and Mary Ellen Rudin House

- Location within Wisconsin

General information
- Type: House
- Architectural style: Usonian
- Location: 110 Marinette Trail; Madison, Wisconsin; United States
- Coordinates: 43.0652°N 89.4689°W
- Construction started: 1959

Design and construction
- Architect: Frank Lloyd Wright

The Walter and Mary Ellen Rudin House is located at 110 Marinette Trail, Madison, Wisconsin, United States. It was designed in 1957 by Frank Lloyd Wright and prefabricated by Marshall Erdman. The house is the first of two examples of the second type (known as Prefab #2) of the Marshall Erdman Prefab Houses. This house and the James McBean Residence have the same floor plan and vary only in minor details such as paint color and siting. Construction was completed in June 1959 and the house was sold to mathematicians Walter and Mary Ellen Rudin from the University of Wisconsin–Madison.

The house has a large, square 2-story living room which is lit by a wall of windows. Also on the first floor are the dining area, kitchen, entry hall, utility room, and the master bedroom. A large concrete block fireplace separates the kitchen and living room. A stairway leads to a balcony and three second-story bedrooms. Unusual for a Wright-designed house, it has a full basement.

The house is constructed from concrete block with horizontal board and batten siding. A row of clerestory windows just below the soffit make the chunky flat cantilevered roof "appear to float above the house." A carport attached to one corner of the house completes the design.

== See also ==
- List of Frank Lloyd Wright works
