= Angellift =

Cosmetic dentistry device

Angellift is a brand of noninvasive, removable perioral (mouth) implant or prosthetic marketed by Medical Matrix, LLC, it's claimed use to lift and tighten the lower facial dermis. Angellift came about when a California surgeon wanted to provide his patients with a preview of their new appearance, but the concept is believed to date back more than 25 years in use by European actors.

Angellift is not Better Business Bureau (BBB) accredited, its accreditation was revoked by the BBB on September 8, 2026, and, out of possible ratings from A+ to F, it's BBB Rating is F including due to failure to respond to complaints and the number of complaints filed against the business.

In the United States they are just one aspect of a growing trend in cosmetic dentistry. The first ones in the United States were made in 2003, and are still in use. Angellift was featured in the fifth season of Shark Tank with only one angel investor "Shark" making a deal, but which deal never closed.

The American Dental Association and Canadian Dental Association have not been invited to participate in the development of this device as it does not affect teeth or occlusion; although the device is fit within the mouth, it claims to affect the skin surface and not the perioral cavity. The Angellift devices are cleaned in similar fashion as retainers or dentures.

In 2008, Angellift introduced an over-the-counter version of the original prescriptive model which could only be fit by dentists. The over-the-counter version does not require a dental visit as it does not attach to the teeth. Also in 2008, Angellift applied to the Food and Drug Administration for administration approval for general physicians and dermatologists.
