= Vietoris =

Vietoris is a surname. Notable people with the surname include:

- Christian Vietoris (born 1989), German racing driver
- Leopold Vietoris (1891–2002), Austrian mathematician, World War I veteran, and supercentenarian
