= Mary Ellen Rudin =

American mathematician (1924–2013)

- Born: Mary Ellen Estill; December 7, 1924; Hillsboro, Texas
- Died: March 18, 2013 (aged 88)
- Citizenship: American
- Spouse: Walter Rudin
- Awards: Noether Lecturer

Academic background
- Education: University of Texas at Austin
- Thesis: Concerning Abstract Spaces (1949)
- Doctoral advisor: Robert Lee Moore

Academic work
- Discipline: Mathematics
- Sub-discipline: Set-theoretic topology
- Institutions: Duke University, University of Rochester, University of Wisconsin at Madison
- Doctoral students: Michael Starbird

Mary Ellen Rudin (December 7, 1924 – March 18, 2013) was an American mathematician known for her work in set-theoretic topology. In 2013, Elsevier established the Mary Ellen Rudin Young Researcher Award, which is awarded annually to a young researcher, mainly in fields adjacent to general topology.

== Early life and education ==
Mary Ellen (Estill) Rudin was born in Hillsboro, Texas to Joe Jefferson Estill and Irene (Shook) Estill. Her mother Irene was an English teacher before marriage, and her father Joe was a civil engineer. The family moved with her father's work, but spent a great deal of Mary Ellen's childhood around Leakey, Texas. She had one sibling, a younger brother. Both of Rudin's maternal grandmothers had attended Mary Sharp College near their hometown of Winchester, Tennessee. Rudin remarks on this legacy and how much her family valued education in an interview.

She attended the University of Texas, completing her B.A. in 1944 after just three years before moving into the graduate program in mathematics under Robert Lee Moore. Her graduate thesis presented a counterexample to one of "Moore's axioms". She completed her Ph.D. in 1949.

During her time as an undergraduate, she was a member of the Phi Mu Women's Fraternity, and was elected to the Phi Beta Kappa society.

In 1953, she married mathematician Walter Rudin, whom she met while teaching at Duke University. They had four children.

== Career ==
At the beginning of her career, Rudin taught at Duke University and the University of Rochester. She took a position as lecturer at the University of Wisconsin in 1959, and was appointed Professor of Mathematics in 1971. After her retirement in 1991, she continued to serve as a Professor Emerita. She was the first Grace Chisholm Young Professor of Mathematics and also held the Hilidale Professorship.

She was an Invited Speaker of the International Congress of Mathematicians in 1974 in Vancouver. She served as vice-president of the American Mathematical Society, 1980–1981. In 1984 she was selected to be a Noether Lecturer. She was an honorary member of the Hungarian Academy of Sciences (1995). In 2012 she became a fellow of the American Mathematical Society.

Rudin is best known in topology for her constructions of counterexamples to well-known conjectures. In 1958, she found an unshellable triangulation of the tetrahedron. Most famously, Rudin was the first to construct a Dowker space, which she did in 1971, thus disproving a conjecture of Clifford Hugh Dowker that had stood, and helped drive topological research, for more than twenty years. Her example fueled the search for "small" ZFC Dowker spaces. She, Keiko Chiba, and C. Przymusiński also proved the first Morita conjecture and a restricted version of the second. Her last major result was a proof of Nikiel's conjecture. Early proofs that every metric space is paracompact were somewhat involved, but Rudin provided an elementary one.

"Reading the articles of Mary Ellen Rudin, studying them until there is no mystery takes hours and hours; but those hours are rewarded, the student obtains power to which few have access. They are not hard to read, they are just hard mathematics, that's all." (Steve Watson)

== Later life ==
Rudin resided in Madison, Wisconsin, in the Rudin House, a home designed by architect Frank Lloyd Wright. She died aged 88 on March 18, 2013.

== Publications ==
- Rudin, Mary Ellen (1975). Lectures on set theoretic topology (Rep. with corr. ed.). Providence: Published for the Conference Board of the Mathematical Sciences by the American Mathematical Society (AMS). ISBN 978-0821816738. Book details at AMS Bookstore
- Rudin, Mary Ellen (1984). Dowker spaces (in the Handbook of set-theoretic topology). Amsterdam u.a.: North-Holland. pp. 761–780. ISBN 978-0444865809.

== Mary Ellen Rudin Young Researcher Award ==
The Mary Ellen Rudin Young Researcher Award is an annual award given to young researchers in general topology and its related fields. It was established in 2013 by Elsevier on behalf of the journal Topology and its Applications and consists of US$15,000 that must be used by the awardee in the following way: US$5,000 for three major conferences in topology, US$5,000 for visiting a research center, and US$5,000, which can be used freely and is regarded as a cash prize.

The prize was named after Rudin. Rudin gave her permission to use her name for the award but died before the first prize was awarded.

=== List of awardees ===
Year	Name	Institution	Awarded at	Area of contribution
2025	Jonathan Cancino-Manríquez	National Autonomous University of Mexico	59th Spring Topology and Dynamical Systems Conference. The University of Alabama at Birmingham, Alabama, USA. March 11–13, 2026.	Ultrafilters, set theory.
2024	Francesco Fournier-Facio	Herchel-Smith Fellow, University of Cambridge.	58th Spring Topology and Dynamical Systems Conference. Christopher Newport University, Newport News, Virginia, USA. March 6–8, 2025.	Bounded cohomology.
2023	Yvon Verberne	Assistant professor, University of Western Ontario.	57th Spring Topology and Dynamical Systems Conference. UNC Charlotte, North Carolina, USA. March 6–9, 2024.	Low-dimensional topology, geometric group theory.
2022	Jan Grebík	Research fellow, University of Warwick.	56th Spring Topology and Dynamical Systems Conference. Remote, hosted by Rhodes College, Memphis, Tennessee, USA. March 15–18, 2023.	Descriptive set theory, combinatorics, probability theory, distributed computing and ergodic theory.
2021	Jeffrey Bergfalk	Postdoc, University of Vienna.	55th Spring Topology and Dynamical Systems Conference. Baylor University, Waco, Texas, USA. March 9–12, 2022.	Algebraic topology, set theory
2019	James Hyde	H.C. Wang Assistant Professor, Cornell University.	54th Spring Topology and Dynamical Systems Conference. Remote, hosted by Murray State University, Murray, Kentucky, USA. May 12–15, 2021.	Homeomorphism groups
2018	Osvaldo Guzmán	Postdoc, University of Toronto.	53rd Spring Topology and Dynamical Systems Conference. The University of Alabama at Birmingham. March 14–16, 2019.	Almost disjoint families, set theory
2017	Balázs Strenner	Hale Visiting assistant professor, Georgia Tech.	52nd Spring Topology and Dynamical Systems Conference. Auburn University, Auburn, Alabama, USA. March 15, 2018.	Pseudo-Anosov homeomorphisms
2016	Kathryn Mann	Morrey Visiting assistant professor at University of California at Berkeley.	51st Spring Topology and Dynamical Systems Conference. New Jersey City University. March 8–11, 2017.	Homeomorphism groups of manifolds
2015	Yinhe Peng	Postdoc, Chinese Academy of Sciences.	1st Pan Pacific International Conference on Topology and Applications. Zhangzhou, China. November 25–30, 2015.	Base problem for topological spaces
2014	Yash Lodha	Ph.D. candidate, Cornell University.	60 years of Dow conference. Cornell University. December 6–9, 2014.	Groups of homeomorphisms of low dimensional manifolds
2013	Logan C. Hoehn	Assistant Professor, Department of Computer Science & Mathematics, Nipissing University.	International Conference on Topology and Geometry. Shimane University, Matsue City, Japan. September 2013.	Solution of Lelek's problem

==== Other recognition ====
She is included in a deck of playing cards featuring notable women mathematicians published by the Association of Women in Mathematics.
