= Kiiti Morita =

Japanese mathematician (1915–1995)

- Born: August 11, 1915; Hamamatsu, Shizuoka Prefecture, Japan
- Died: August 4, 1995 (aged 79); Fuchū, Tokyo, Japan
- Education: Tokyo Higher Normal School; Osaka University
- Known for: Morita equivalence Morita conjectures
- Scientific career
- Fields: Mathematics
- Workplaces: University of Tsukuba; Sophia University
- Notable students: Jun-iti Nagata

Kiiti Morita (森田 紀一, Morita Kiichi; February 11, 1915 – August 4, 1995) was a Japanese mathematician working in algebra and topology.

Morita was born in 1915 in Hamamatsu, Shizuoka Prefecture and graduated from the Tokyo Higher Normal School in 1936. Three years later he was appointed assistant at the Tokyo University of Science. He received his Ph.D. from Osaka University in 1950, with a thesis in topology. After teaching at the Tokyo Higher Normal School, he became professor at the University of Tsukuba in 1951. He held this position until 1978, after which he taught at Sophia University. He had a wife, Tomiko, with whom he had a son, Yasuhiro. Morita died of heart failure in 1995 at the Sakakibara Heart Institute in Tokyo;

He introduced the concepts now known as Morita equivalence and Morita duality which were given wide circulation in the 1960s by Hyman Bass in a series of lectures. The Morita conjectures on normal topological spaces are also named after him.

== Publications ==
- Morita, Kiiti (1958). "Duality for modules and its applications to the theory of rings with minimum condition". Science Reports of the Tokyo Kyoiku Daigaku. Section A. 6 (150): 83–142. MR 0096700. Zbl 0080.25702.
- Morita, Kiiti (1962). "Paracompactness and product spaces". Fundamenta Mathematicae. 50 (3): 223–236. doi:10.4064/fm-50-3-223-236. MR 0132525.
- Morita, Kiiti (1964). "Products of normal spaces with metric spaces". Mathematische Annalen. 154 (4): 365–382. doi:10.1007/BF01362570. MR 0165491. S2CID 120516038.
- Morita, Kiiti (1977). "Some problems on normality of products of spaces". In Novák, Josef (ed.). General topology and its relations to modern analysis and algebra, IV (Proc. Fourth Prague Topological Sympos., Prague, 1976), Part B. Prague: Soc. Czechoslovak Mathematicians and Physicists. pp. 296–297. MR 0482657.
