= Facial prosthetic =

Device used to alter the appearance of a person's face or head

A facial prosthetic or facial prosthesis is an artificial device used to change or adapt the outward appearance of a person's face or head.

When used in the theater, film, or television industry, facial prosthetic makeup alters a person's normal face into something extraordinary. Facial prosthetics can be made from a wide range of materials, including gelatin, foam latex, silicone, and cold foam. Effects can be as subtle as altering the curve of a cheek or nose, or making someone appear older or younger than they are. A facial prosthesis can also transform an actor into any creature, such as legendary creatures, animals, and others.

To apply facial prosthetics, Pros-Aide, Beta Bond, medical adhesive, or liquid latex is generally used. Pros-Aide is a water-based adhesive that has been the "industry standard" for over 30 years. It is completely waterproof and is formulated for use with sensitive skin. It is easily removed with Pros-Aide Remover. BetaBond is growing in popularity among Hollywood artists who say it is easier to remove. Medical adhesive has the advantage that it is specifically designed not to cause allergies or skin irritation. Liquid latex can only be used for a few hours, but can be used to create realistic blends from skin to prosthetics.

After application, cosmetics and/or paint is used to color the prosthetics and skin the desired colors, and achieve a realistic transition from skin to prosthetic. This can be done by the wearer, but is often done by a separate, trained artist.

At the end of its use, some prosthetics can be removed simply by being pulled off. Others need special solvents to help remove the prosthetics, such as Pros-Aide Remover (water based and completely safe) for Pros-Aide, Beta Solv for Beta Bond, and medical adhesive remover for medical adhesive.

Prosthetic make-up is becoming increasingly popular for everyday use. This kind of make-up is used by people who wish to significantly alter their features.

== History of facial prosthetics ==
=== Emergence in ancient history ===
It began not after antiquity where the face was worn with artificial parts despite the lack of proof in the theory. It has been found that archaeologists stumbled upon an artifact that was false inside a skull's left eye socket in Iran that goes way back around 3000–2900 B.C. Traces of thread were seen on the eye socket. When the person of the head skull died, the false eye was inserted. Gold masks were found on mummies in ancient Egypt tombs around 2500 B.C., cosmetic gold and silver coins were present. The revelation of these findings are the start of the knowledge of the skill of facial prosthetics and in the ancient times focused on the social priority of the face. Body parts such as noses, ears and hands were a way as punishment for adultery in ancient India. In the Vedic period, a well-known disquisition on the Indian treatments named The Sushruta Samhita, had done a report of the nasal pyramid with a cutaneous flap had been taken from the frontal region which shows signs of surgical reconstruction. The luck of it succeeding was not as high compared to these days. Hence, showing theories on prosthetic reconstructions attempts in history that are possibly not reported.

Around 1810–1750 B.C., in Mesopotamia, it was found that punitive mutilations by King Hammurabi were done despite his medical and morality being recognized. The people that had mutilated others had been retaliated by punishment which had restored lost parts which encouraged a few attempts at surgical grafting. There was barely any mention of facial prosthesis in the writings of the Greco-Roman period. Long bone fracture reductions and restraints were more interesting to Hippocrates, Galen, and Celsus than the treatment in maxillofacial defects.

=== Facial prostheses of the kings in post-classical history ===
The Byzantines in the Middle Ages believed that an individual would not be able to have become an emperor if his or her nose was severed (a punishment known as a "rhinokopia"). Emperor Leontius ordered the mutilation of Justinian II's nose.

In 1000, Holy Roman Emperor Otto III visited the tomb of Charlemagne in Aix-la-Chapelle, France. A tooth of Charlemagne was removed by Otto as a relic and a gold plate became a replacement to a piece of the cadaver's broken nose.

During that time as well, ivory-made facial prostheses were described by al-Zahrawi (936–1013).

=== The birth of maxillofacial prosthetics in modern history (early modern period) ===
Ambroise Paré founded maxillofacial prosthetics who had the clinical knowledge tinged with military medicine, which gave the first maxillofacial prosthesis with surgical anchorage. After three years had passed using human dissections to get educated on human anatomy, despite being previously known from the biggest hospital in the kingdom of France, the Hôtel-Dieu in Paris, he made the decision to relocate to Vitré to obtain knowledge of surgery from a barber. He proceeded to practice in heavy mutilations as a military surgeon prior to being assigned as "Surgeon of The King" of France (for Charles IX and Henry III).

=== Materials and techniques for facial prosthesis in modern history (late modern period) ===
In the 19th century, throughout the time of the Industrial Revolution, appearance was improved a great deal by recently developed materials accessible for facial prostheses. Silver and gold were exchanged with lighter materials as they gave discomfort to the face and were stiff. To mask disfigurement, epitheses were used as it was practical and more successful therapeutics. In fact, in 1851, sulfur was incorporated into rubber which made Goodyear acquire vulcanite. It turned out to be a vital component of conventional dental prosthesis and facial prosthesis. A trouble-free and colorable creation being able to be used in both hard and soft structures.

The application of vulcanite for facial prostheses was also mentioned by Norman Kingsley and Apoléoni Preterre in 1864 and 1866, respectively. In 1879, celluloid was used by Kingsley. Maxillofacial prosthetics were given a new dimension by mixing maxillofacial surgery with dental prosthetics by a French physician and dentist, Claude Martin by the end of the 19th century. "Surgical" and "prosthesis" were terms used in conjunction with each other by Martin for the first time in De La Prothese Immediate, Appliquee a La Resection Des Maxillaires. He had explained that in giving fulfilling skin simulation, the use of translucent ceramics for nasal prosthesis after amputation is the key.

== Cultural representation ==
Facial prosthetics are shown in film and television. Examples of their use in film include Live and Let Die and in television, the original series of Mission Impossible and the successor series, Mission: Impossible (1988 TV series).

== Problems ==
Being exposed to high temperatures can cause problems when wearing prosthetics. Glues that were sturdy at normal temperatures can become less effective under heat. This could lead to prosthetics falling apart or peeling from the skin.

Higher temperatures can cause sweating which can also affect the durability of the prosthetics. The negative effects of sweating can be prevented by cleaning the skin well with 99% alcohol before applying the adhesive. Another way to ensure that the facial prosthetics stay on once they have been applied is to treat the skin with an anti-perspirant beforehand.

== See also ==
- Angellift
- Lifecasting
- Prosthesis
- Prosthetic makeup
