= Dowker space =

In the mathematical field of general topology, a Dowker space is a topological space that is T_{4} but not countably paracompact. They are named after Clifford Hugh Dowker.

The non-trivial task of providing an example of a Dowker space (and therefore also proving their existence as mathematical objects) helped mathematicians better understand the nature and variety of topological spaces.

== Equivalences ==
Dowker showed, in 1951, the following:

If X is a normal T_{1} space (that is, a T_{4} space), then the following are equivalent:

- X is a Dowker space
- The product of X with the unit interval is not normal.
- X is not countably metacompact.

Dowker conjectured that there were no Dowker spaces, and the conjecture was not resolved until Mary Ellen Rudin constructed one in 1971. Rudin's counterexample is a very large space (of cardinality $\aleph_\omega^{\aleph_0}$). Zoltán Balogh gave the first ZFC construction of a small (cardinality continuum) example, which was more well-behaved than Rudin's. Using PCF theory, M. Kojman and S. Shelah constructed a subspace of Rudin's Dowker space of cardinality $\aleph_{\omega+1}$ that is also Dowker.
