= Oxygen mask =

Interface between oxygen delivery system and human user

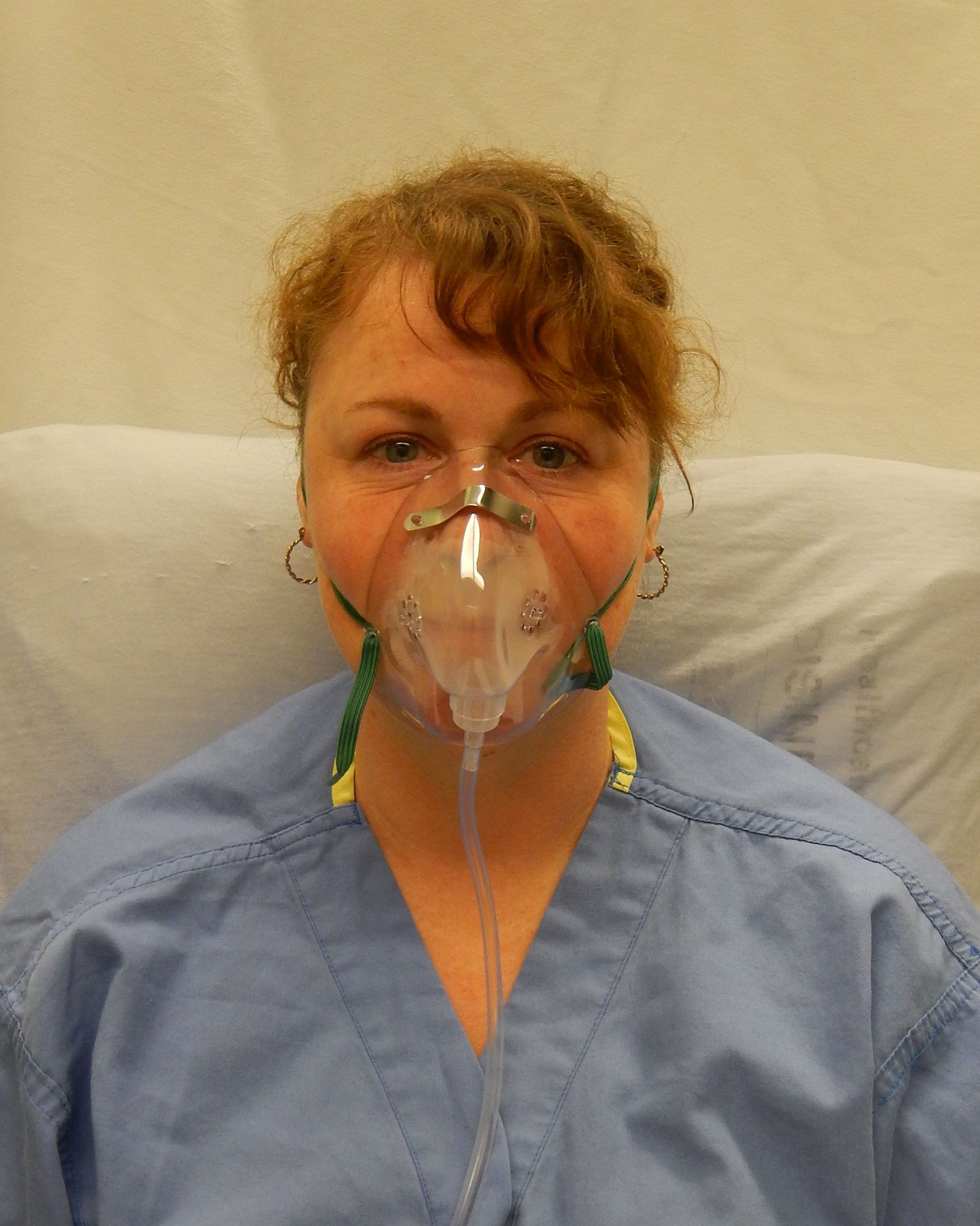
A woman wearing an oxygen mask

An oxygen mask is a mask that provides a method to transfer breathing oxygen gas from a storage tank to the lungs. Oxygen masks may cover only the nose and mouth (oral nasal mask) or the entire face (full-face mask). They may be made of plastic, silicone, or rubber. In certain circumstances, oxygen may be delivered via a nasal cannula instead of a mask.

== Medical plastic oxygen masks ==
=== Examples of medical plastic oxygen masks ===
Medical plastic oxygen masks are used primarily by medical care providers for oxygen therapy because they are disposable and so reduce cleaning costs and infection risks. Mask design can determine accuracy of oxygen delivered in various medical situations requiring oxygen therapy.

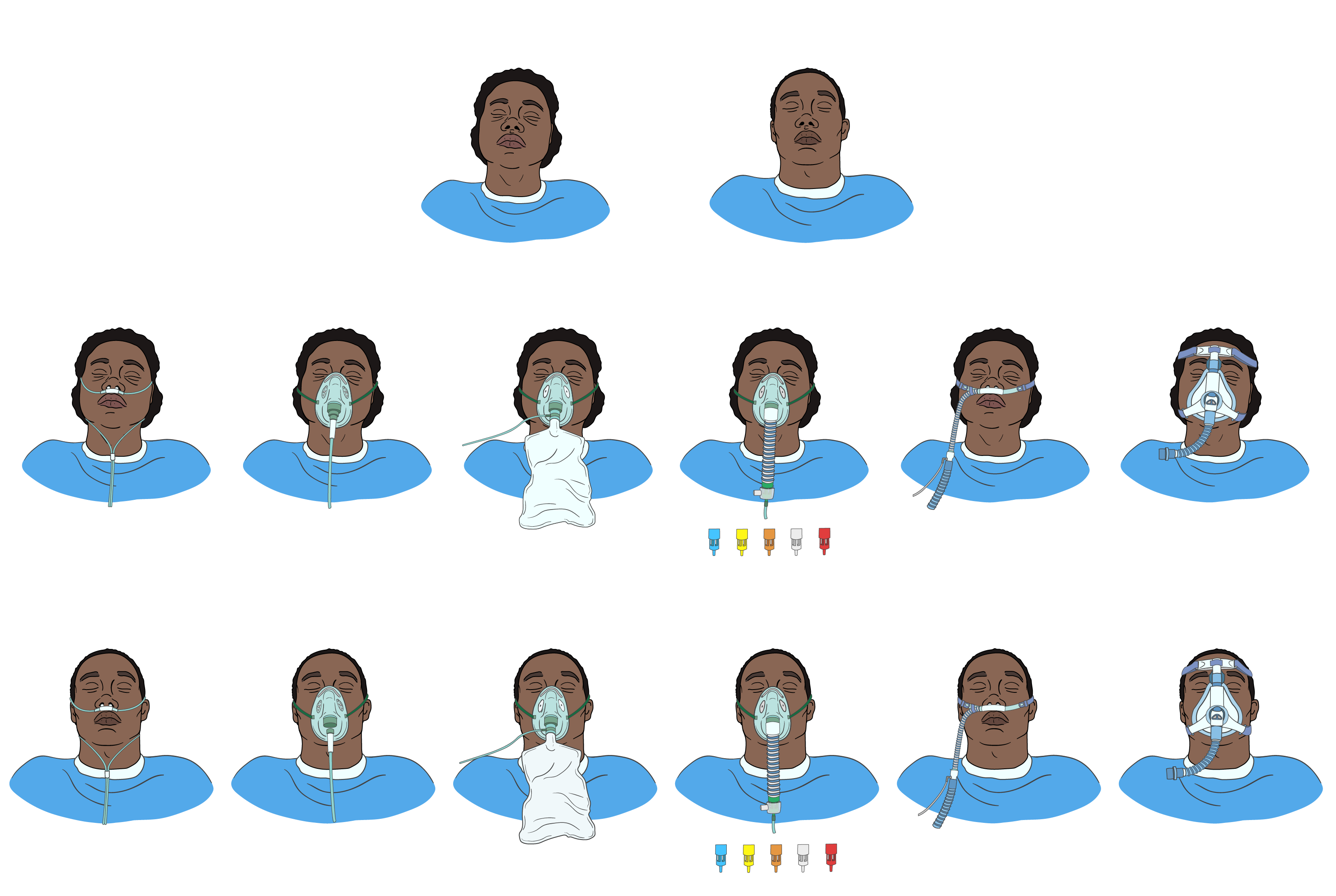
Respiratory care devices image

Oxygen is naturally occurring in room air at 21% and higher percentages are often essential in medical treatment. Oxygen in these higher percentages is classified as a drug with too much oxygen being potentially harmful to a patient's health, resulting in oxygen dependence over time, and in extreme circumstances patient blindness. For these reasons oxygen therapy is closely monitored. Masks are light in weight and attached using an elasticated headband or ear loops. They are transparent, allowing the face to remain visible for patient assessment by healthcare providers, and reducing a sensation of claustrophobia experienced by some patients when wearing an oxygen mask. The vast majority of patients having an operation will at some stage wear an oxygen mask; they may alternatively wear a nasal cannula but oxygen delivered in this way is less accurate and restricted in concentration.

The global disposable oxygen masks market, according to Altus Market Research, has the potential to grow by US$1.1 billion between 2019 and 2023. The market's growth pace will also pick up speed throughout this time.

== Silicone and rubber masks ==
Silicone and rubber oxygen masks are heavier than plastic masks. They are designed to provide a good seal for long-duration use by aviators, medical research subjects, and hyperbaric chamber and other patients who require administration of pure oxygen, such as carbon monoxide poisoning and decompression sickness victims. Dr. Arthur H. Bulbulian of Armenian descent pioneered the first modern viable oxygen mask, worn by World War II pilots and used by hospitals. Valves inside these tight-fitting masks control the flow of gases into and out of the masks, so that rebreathing of exhaled gas is minimized.

== Hoses and tubing and oxygen regulators ==
Hoses and tubing connect an oxygen mask to the oxygen supply. Hoses are larger in diameter than tubing and can allow greater oxygen flow. When a hose is used it may have a ribbed or corrugated design to allow bending of the hose while preventing twisting and cutting off the oxygen flow. The quantity of oxygen delivered from the storage tank to the oxygen mask is controlled by a valve called a regulator. Some types of oxygen masks have a breathing bag made of plastic or rubber attached to the mask or oxygen supply hose to store a supply of oxygen to allow deep breathing without wasting oxygen when using simple fixed-flow regulators.

== Oxygen masks for aviators ==
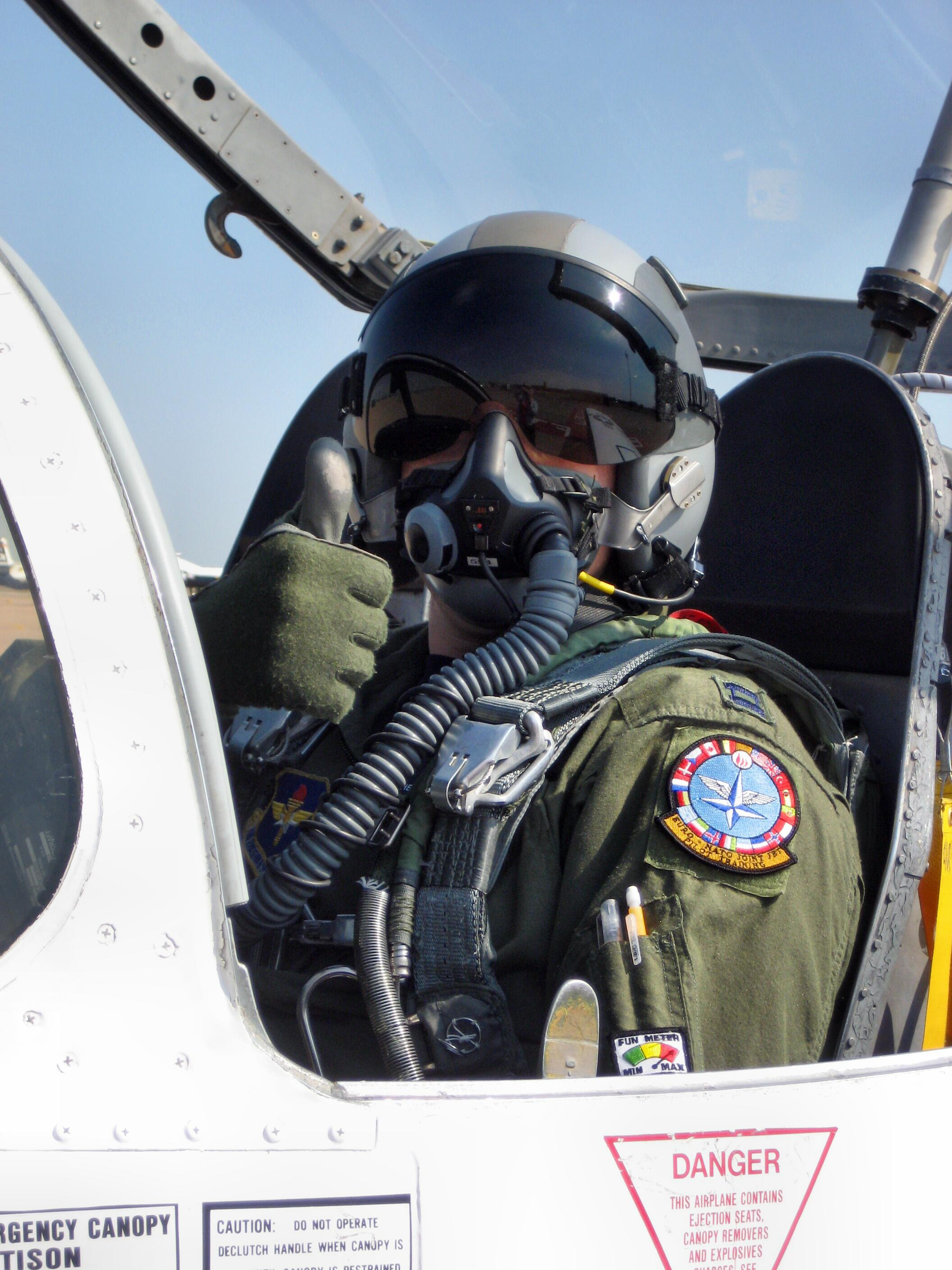
A T-37 pilot wearing a mask designed for both diluted- and pressure-demand breathing

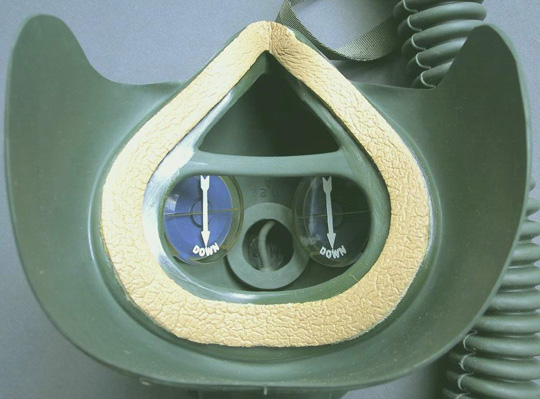
Inner view of a military aviators mask showing face seal, facepiece and inhalation valves

=== History ===
An early 1919 high-altitude oxygen system used a vacuum flask of liquid oxygen to supply two people for one hour at 15,000 ft (4,600 m). The liquid passed through several warming stages before use, as expansion when it evaporated, and absorbed latent heat of vaporization, would make the gasified oxygen so cold that it could cause instant frostbite of the lungs.

The first successful creation for the oxygen mask was by Armenian born Dr. Arthur Bulbulian, in the field of facial prosthetics, in 1941 during World War II.

Many designs of aviator's oxygen masks contain a microphone to transmit speech to other crew members and to the aircraft's radio. Military aviators' oxygen masks have face pieces that partially cover the sides of the face and protect the face against flash burns, flying particles, and effects of a high speed air stream hitting the face during emergency evacuation from the aircraft by ejection seat or parachute. They are often part of a pressure suit or intended for use with a flight helmet.

=== Regulations ===
Three main kinds of oxygen masks are used by pilots and crews who fly at high altitudes: continuous flow, dilute demand, and pressure demand.

In a continuous-flow system, oxygen is provided to the user continuously. It does not matter if the user is exhaling or inhaling as oxygen is flowing from the time the system is activated. Below the oxygen mask is a rebreather bag that collects oxygen during exhalation and as a result allows a higher flow rate during the inhalation cycle.

Diluter-demand and pressure-demand masks supply oxygen only when the user inhales. They each require a good seal between the mask and the user's face.

In a diluter-demand system, as the altitude increases (ambient pressure, and therefore the partial pressure of ambient oxygen, decreases), the oxygen flow increases such that the partial pressure of oxygen is roughly constant. Diluter-demand oxygen systems can be used up to 40,000 ft (12,000 m).

In a pressure-demand system, oxygen in the mask is above ambient pressure, permitting breathing above 40,000 feet (12,000 m). Because the pressure inside the mask is greater than the pressure around the user's torso, inhalation is easy, but exhalation requires more effort. Aviators are trained in pressure-demand breathing in altitude chambers. Because they seal tightly, pressure-demand-type oxygen masks are also used in hyperbaric oxygen chambers and for oxygen breathing research projects with standard oxygen regulators.

Supplemental oxygen is needed for flying more than 30 minutes at cabin pressure altitudes of 12,500 feet (3,800 m) or higher, pilots must use oxygen at all times above 14,000 feet (4,300 m) and each occupant must be provided supplemental oxygen above 15,000 feet (4,600 m).

== Aviation passenger masks and emergency oxygen systems ==
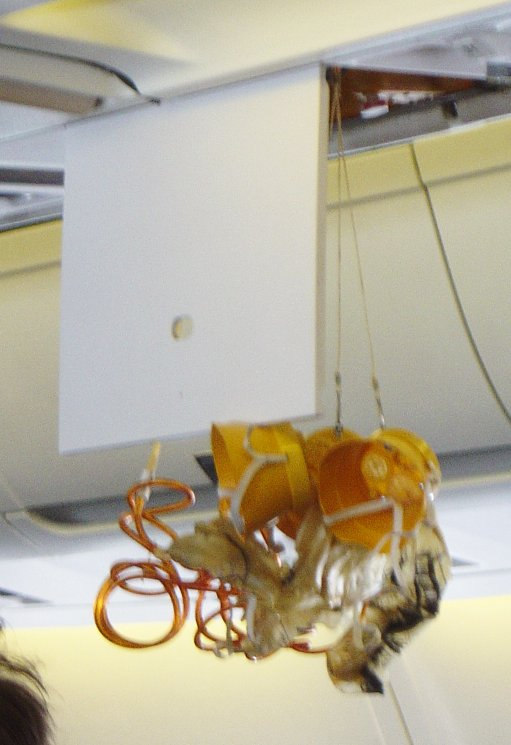
Emergency oxygen masks deployed

Most commercial aircraft are fitted with oxygen masks for use when cabin pressurization fails. In general, commercial aircraft are pressurized so that the cabin air is at a pressure equivalent to no more than 8,000 feet (2,400 m) altitude (usually somewhat lower altitude), where one can breathe normally without an oxygen mask. If the oxygen pressure in the cabin drops below a safe level, risking hypoxia, compartments containing the oxygen masks will open automatically, either above or in front of the passenger and crew seats, and in the lavatories.

In the early years of commercial flight, before pressurized cabins were invented, airliner passengers sometimes had to wear oxygen masks during routine flights.

== Self-contained breathing apparatus (SCBA) ==
Firefighters and emergency service workers use full face masks that provide breathing air as well as eye and face protection. These masks are typically attached to a tank carried upon the back of the wearer and are called self-contained breathing apparatuses (SCBA). Open circuit SCBAs do not normally supply oxygen, as it is not necessary and constitutes an easily avoidable fire hazard. Rebreather SCBAs usually supply oxygen as this is the lightest and most compact option, and uses a simpler mechanism than other types of rebreather.

== Specialized masks for astronauts ==
Specialized full-face masks that supply oxygen or other breathing gases are used by astronauts to remove nitrogen from their blood before space walks (EVA).

== Specialized masks for pets ==
Specialized snout masks which supply oxygen to revive family pets have been donated to fire departments.

== Oxygen delivery to divers ==
Divers only use pure oxygen for accelerated decompression, or from oxygen rebreathers at shallow depths where the risk of acute oxygen toxicity is acceptable. Oxygen supply during in-water decompression is via rebreather, open circuit diving regulator, full-face mask or diving helmet which has been prepared for oxygen service.

=== Built-in breathing system ===
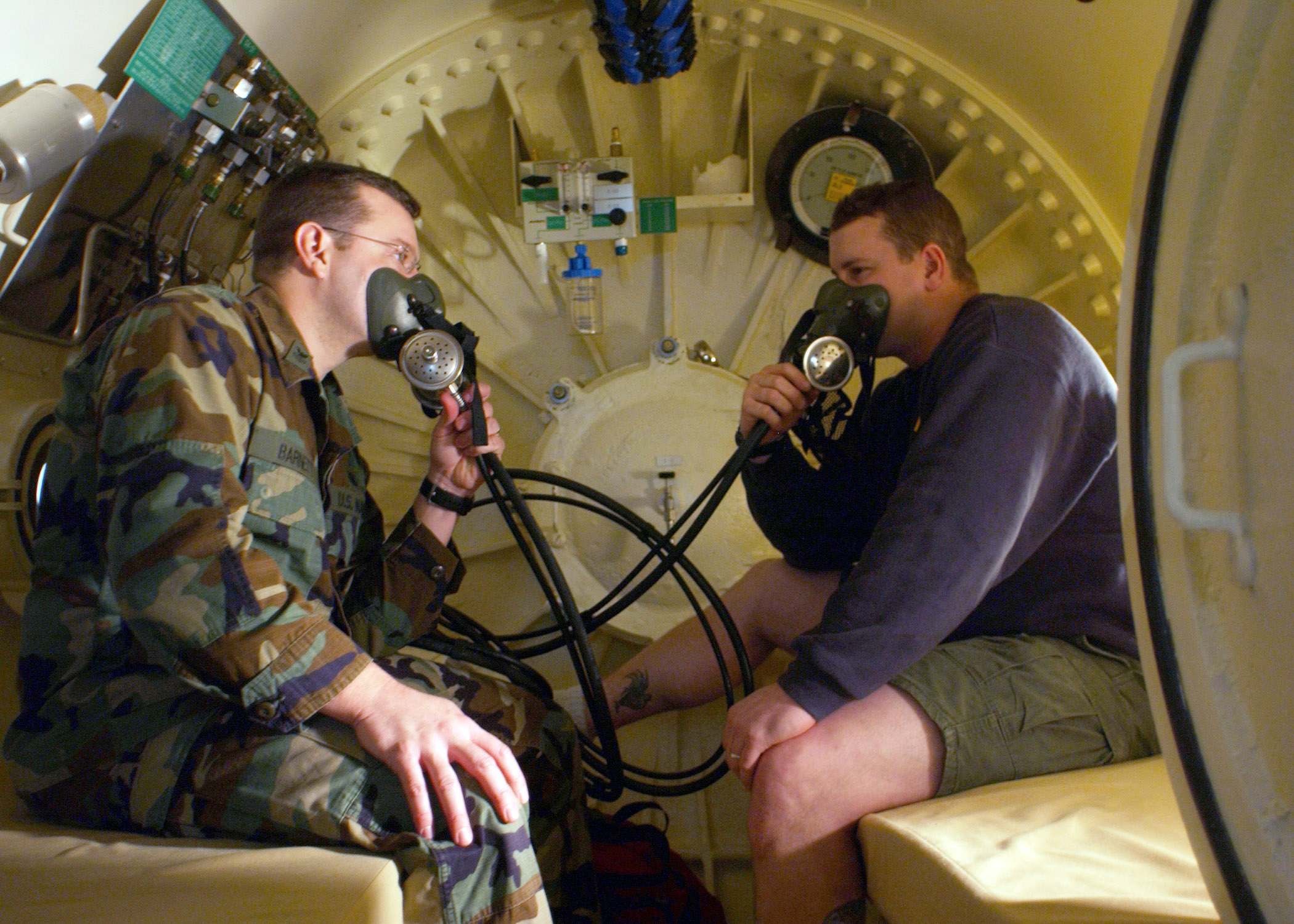
US Navy Divers test built-in breathing masks inside a recompression chamber

Oxygen supply to divers in decompression chambers is preferably through a built-in breathing system, which uses an oxygen mask plumbed into supply and exhaust hoses which supply oxygen from outside the chamber, and discharge the exhaled oxygen-rich gas outside the chamber, using a system equivalent to two demand valves, one upstream of the diver, to supply oxygen on demand, and the other downstream, to exhaust exhaled gas on demand, so that the oxygen partial pressure in the chamber is limited to relatively safe levels. If oxygen masks are used that discharge into the chamber, the chamber air must be replaced frequently to keep the oxygen level within safe operating limits.

== Anesthesia oxygen masks ==
Anesthesia masks are face masks that are designed to administer anesthetic gases to a patient through inhalation. Anesthesia masks are either made of anti-static silicone or rubber, as a static electricity spark may ignite some anesthetic gases. They are either black rubber or clear silicone. Anesthesia masks fit over the mouth and nose and have a double hose system. One hose carries inhaled anesthetic gas to the mask and the other brings exhaled anesthetic gas back to the machine. Anesthesia masks have 4 point head strap harnesses to securely fit on the head to hold the mask in place as the anaesthetist controls the gases and oxygen inhaled.

== Masks for high-altitude climbers ==
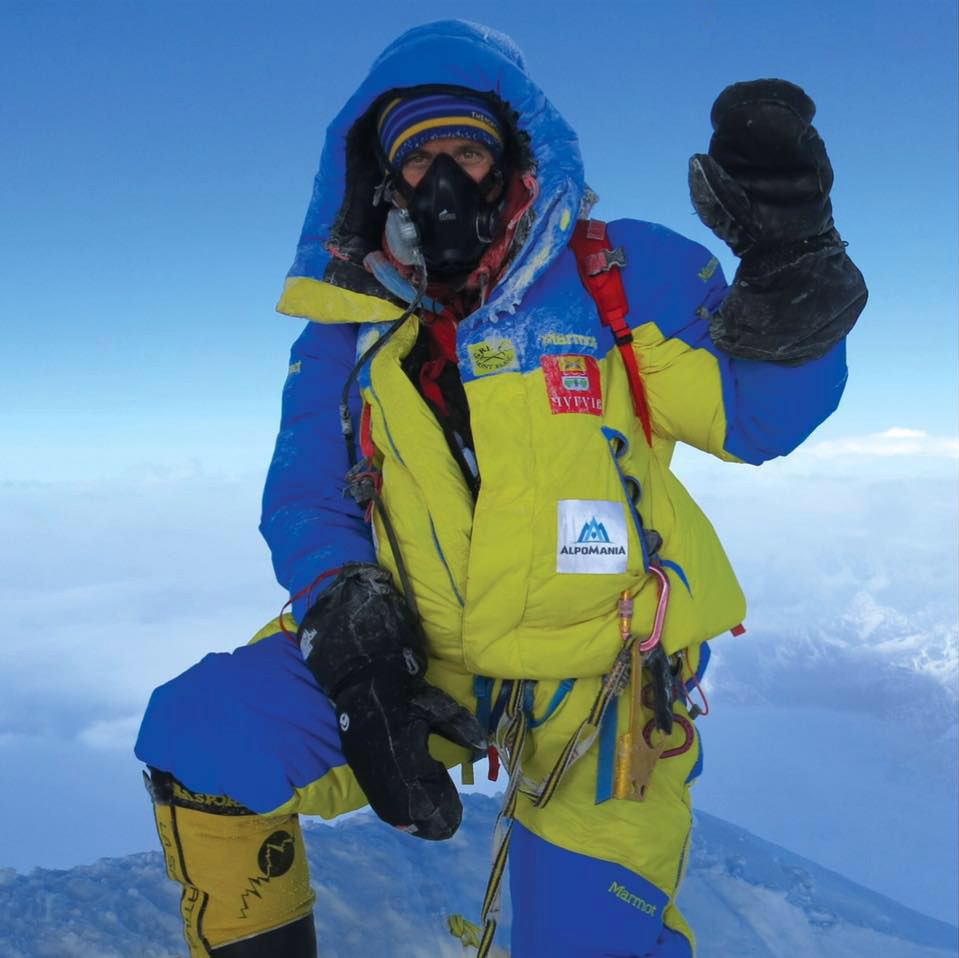
Climber wearing an oxygen mask on the summit of Everest, 2019

Oxygen masks are used by climbers of high peaks such as Mount Everest. Because of the severe cold and harsh conditions oxygen masks for use at extreme altitude must be robust and effective. The oxygen storage tanks used with the masks (called oxygen bottles) are made of lightweight, high-strength metals and are covered in high-strength fiber such as kevlar. These special oxygen bottles are filled with oxygen at a very high pressure which provides a longer time duration of oxygen for breathing than standard pressure oxygen bottles. These systems are generally only used above 7,000 metres (23,000 ft).

In recent years oxygen mask systems for high-altitude climbing which pump oxygen constantly have been increasingly replaced by systems supplying oxygen on demand via nasal cannulas.

== Oxygen helmets ==
Oxygen helmets are used in hyperbaric oxygen chambers for oxygen administration. They are transparent, lightweight plastic helmets with a seal that goes around the wearer's neck that looks like a space suit helmet. They offer a good visual field. Light weight plastic hoses provide oxygen to the helmet and remove exhaled gas to the outside of the chamber. Oxygen helmets are often preferred for oxygen administration in hyperbaric oxygen chambers for children and patients that are uncomfortable wearing an oxygen mask.

== Mask retention systems ==
Medical oxygen masks are held in place by medical personnel or the user by hand, or they may be fitted with a lightweight elastic headband so the mask can be removed quickly. Full-face masks are secured by several straps. Tightly fitting oxygen masks are secured at four points by two head straps. Aviators' masks are often equipped with "quick don" harnesses that allow those in pressurized aircraft to rapidly don the masks in emergencies. Military aviators' oxygen masks are secured to flight helmets with quick-release systems.

== See also ==
- Emergency oxygen system – System for providing oxygen in an aircraft during an emergency
- Full face diving mask – Diving mask that covers the mouth as well as the eyes and nose
- Nasal cannula – Medical device to deliver supplemental oxygen
- Oxygen therapy – Use of oxygen as a medical treatment
- Hyperbaric medicine, also known as Hyperbaric oxygen therapy – Medical treatment at raised ambient pressure
- Oxygen tent – Canopy over a patient to provide supplemental oxygen
- Bottled oxygen (climbing) – Oxygen stored in lightweight portable high pressure cylinders
