= James McBean Residence =

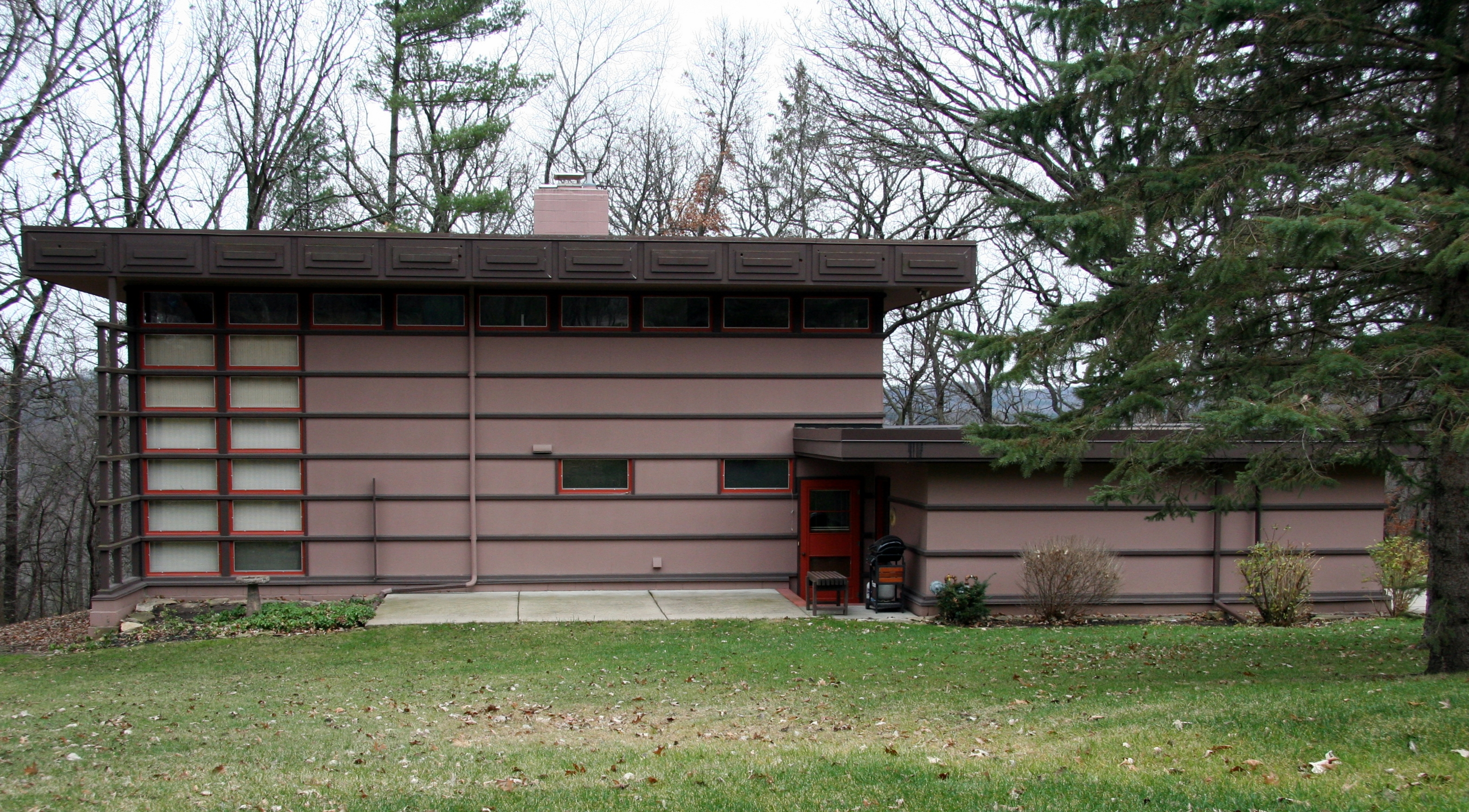

- Location within Minnesota
- Interactive map showing McBean Residence’s location

General information
- Type: House
- Architectural style: Usonian
- Location: Rochester, Minnesota
- Coordinates: 44.001165°N 92.493446°W
- Construction started: 1957

Design and construction
- Architect: Frank Lloyd Wright

The James McBean Residence is a house in Rochester, Minnesota designed by Frank Lloyd Wright. This Usonian house is an example of the second type (Prefab #2) of the Marshall Erdman Prefab Houses. This house and the Walter Rudin House have the same floor plan and vary only in minor details, such as paint color and siting, since they are the only two Prefab #2 houses in existence.

== Construction ==
The house is constructed from concrete block with horizontal board and batten siding. A row of clerestory windows just below the soffit make the chunky flat cantilevered roof appear to float above the house. A carport attached to one corner of the house completes the design.

== See also ==
- List of Frank Lloyd Wright works
