= The Crimson Beech =

House in Staten Island, New York

Catherine and William Cass House ("The Crimson Beech")
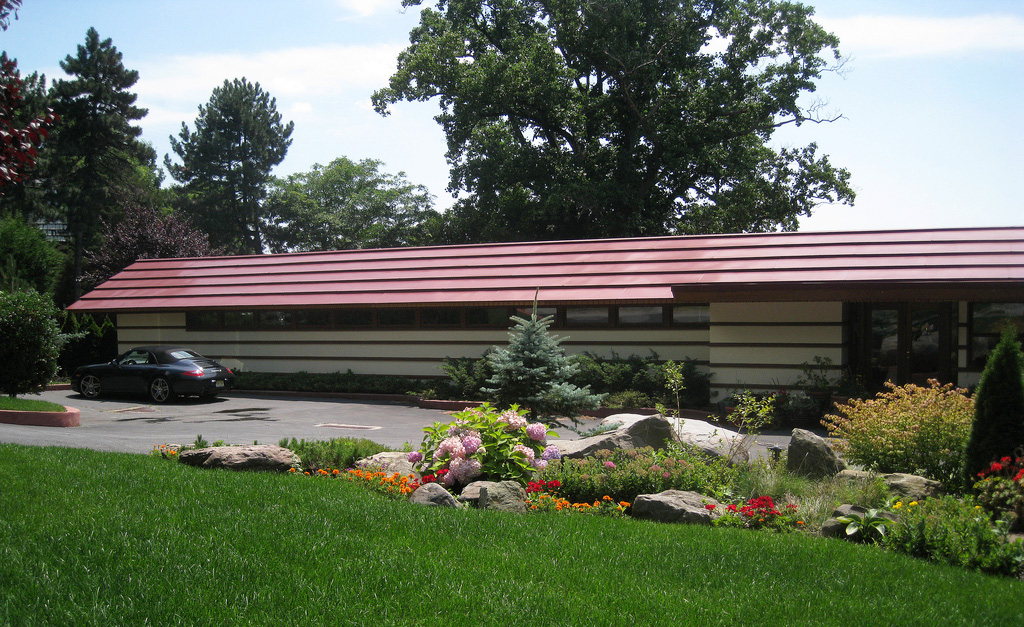

- Location within New York City The Crimson Beech (New York) The Crimson Beech (the United States)

General information
- Type: House
- Architectural style: Usonian
- Location: 48 Manor Court, Staten Island, New York City, New York
- Coordinates: 40.575131°N 74.142319°W
- Construction started: 1959

Design and construction
- Architect: Frank Lloyd Wright

New York City Landmark
- Designated: August 14, 1990
- Reference no.: 1773

The Crimson Beech (also known as the Cass House) is a house designed by Frank Lloyd Wright at 48 Manor Court in the Lighthouse Hill neighborhood of Staten Island in New York City. Its original owners, Catherine and William Cass, ordered a kit house from Marshall Erdman in Madison, Wisconsin; the kit was shipped to Staten Island where it was assembled in 1959. It is the only residence designed by Wright in New York City and one of eleven Marshall Erdman Prefab Houses to be built. The particular model is known as the Prefab #1.

The house features a combined kitchen and family room, a sunken living room with a cathedral ceiling, and a gallery that leads to four bedrooms. All interior walls are paneled in Philippine mahogany, with raised horizontal bands set about a foot apart.

The house is a long and low L shape, with wide hip roofs. The exterior, red brick and largely clad in cream-colored Masonite, is similarly striped with redwood battens that emphasize the low-slung lines. The front of the house has one story, while the rear, because of the sloping site, has two. The roof is made of terne.

At the time of construction, the components of the house cost $20,000 and assembly cost a further $35,000. The house was declared a landmark in August 1990 and the original owners resided there until 1999 when it was sold. It remains in private hands.

== See also ==
- List of Frank Lloyd Wright works
- List of New York City Designated Landmarks in Staten Island
