= Egbertville, Staten Island =

Neighborhood in New York City

Coordinates: 40°34′41″N 74°07′31″W

Egbertville is a neighborhood located immediately inland from, but classifiable within, the East Shore of the borough of Staten Island in New York City. Originally named Stony Brook as the island's first county seat, then renamed after a family that owned a farm there in the 18th century, Egbertville was known for a time as Morgan's Corner, from 1838. Soon after this, many Irish families arrived in the area, leading to its being referred to (somewhat jokingly) by such names as Tipperary Corners, New Dublin, and Young Ireland.

Egbertville is at the center of the Staten Island Greenbelt, with the park system's administrative offices being located there. Richmond Creek flows through a ravine, named the Egbertville Ravine after the neighborhood, as it skims the eastern base of Lighthouse Hill. The community's main thoroughfare is Rockland Avenue, which provides a shortcut between New Dorp on the East Shore and the busy New Springville section of Mid-Island.

The Jacques Marchais Center of Tibetan Art and Moore-McMillen House are listed on the National Register of Historic Places.

Egbertville is served by the S54, S57, S74 and S84 local buses.
