= Marshall Erdman Prefab Houses =

Houses designed by Frank Lloyd Wright

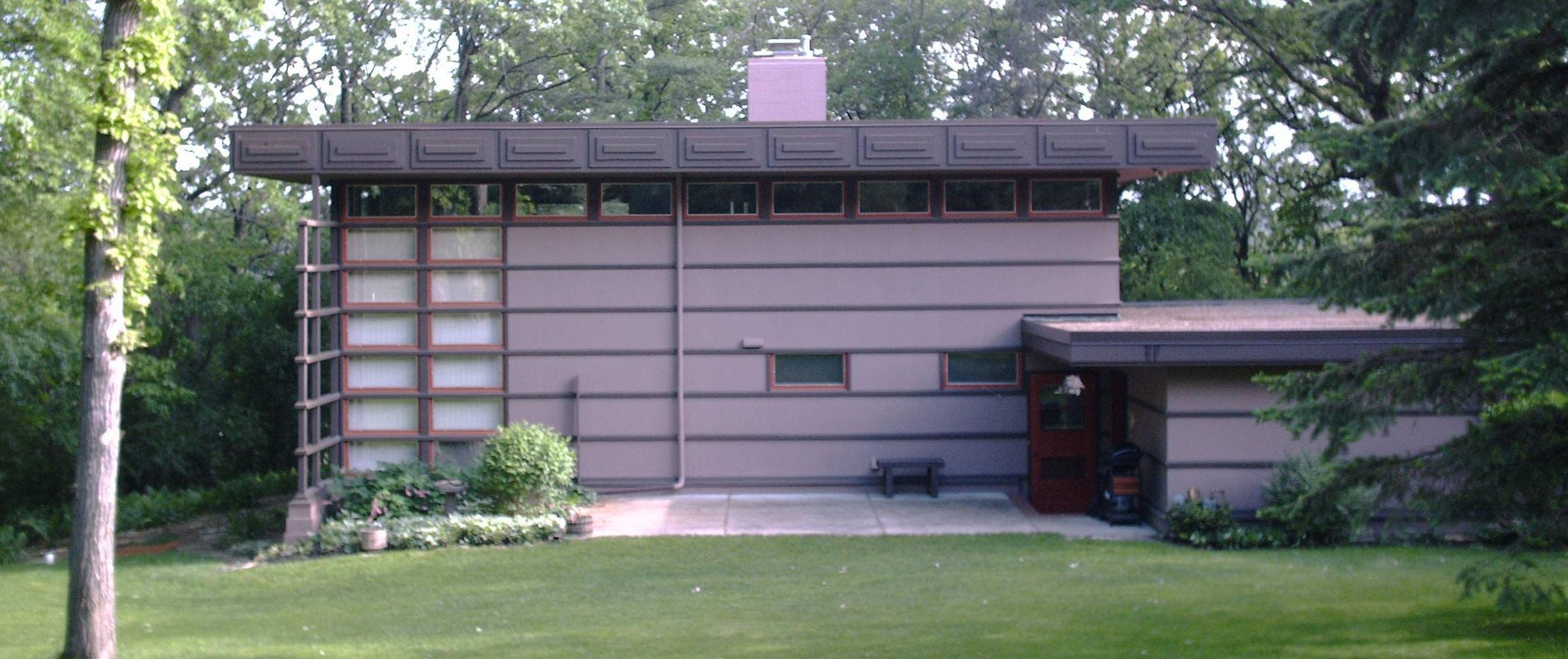
James McBean Residence – Rochester, Minnesota (Prefab #2)

The Marshall Erdman Prefab Houses are a group of eleven prefabricated homes designed in two classes between 1956 and 1960 by noted American architect Frank Lloyd Wright.

Wright had been interested in mass production of housing throughout his career. In 1954, he discovered that the builder Marshall Erdman, who'd contracted with the First Unitarian Society of Madison, Wisconsin, was selling modest prefabricated homes to its congregation.

Wright offered to design better prefabs, at half the $30,000 Marshall Erdman and Associates, Inc. (ME&A) was charging for its version. Wright began work in earnest in late 1955, and by spring of 1956 he had final plans for three Usonian-type homes to be built exclusively by ME&A.

== Overview ==
The prefab package Erdman offered in conjunction with Wright included all the major structural components, interior and exterior walls, floors, windows and doors, as well as cabinets and woodwork. In addition to a lot, the buyer had to provide the foundation, the plumbing fixtures, heating units, electric wiring, drywall, and paint.

Buyers had to submit a topographic map and photos of the lot to Wright before purchasing the property. Wright would determine where the home should sit on the lot. Wright also intended to inspect each home after completion, and to apply his famous glazed red signature brick to the home if it had been completed as planned.

The December 1956 issue of House & Home Magazine featured the Wright designed Marshall Erdman Prefab Houses and included Marshall in the cover story. Nine examples of Prefab #1 were produced, two of Prefab #2, and none of Prefab #3.

== Prefab #1 ==
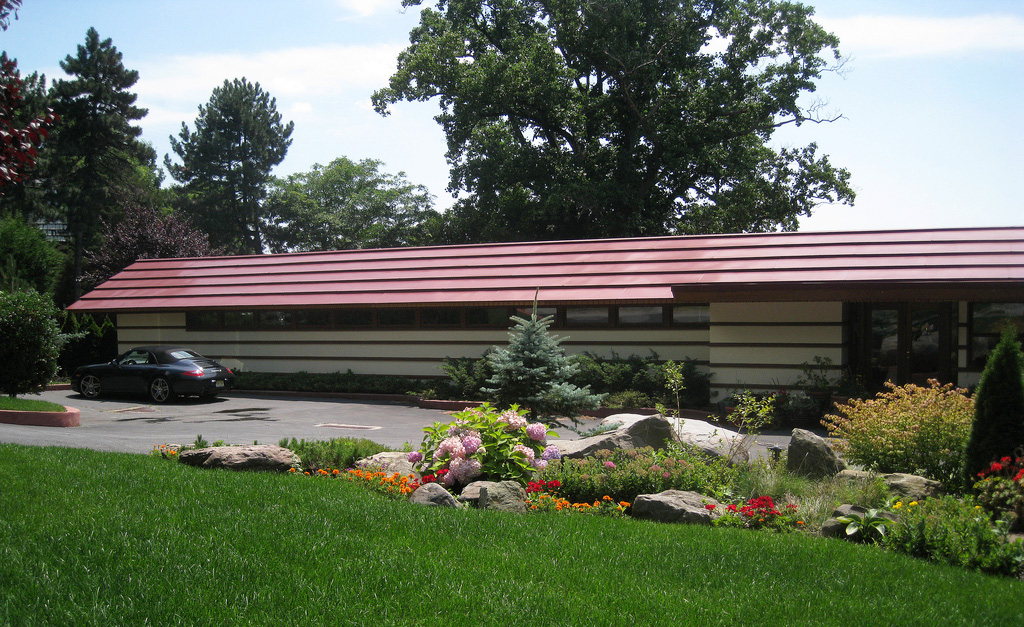
Catherine and William Cass House, "The Crimson Beech"

Wright's design was for a single story, L-shaped home with a pitched-roof bedroom wing joining a flat-roofed living-dining-kitchen area centered on a large masonry fireplace. A carport with one end of its roof resting on a detached storage shed completed the design. Eventually, Wright produced variations, including a fourth bedroom and options for a full or partial basement, ranging in size from 1,860 to 2,400 square feet (173 to 223 m^{2}).

To limit costs, Wright designed the prefab to be built out of standard sheets of plywood, Masonite and drywall, using standard residential Andersen windows and Pella doors. The exterior was to be painted Masonite with horizontal redwood battens, though the house could also be built of stone, concrete block, or partially faced with stone.

Prefab #1 Houses:

- Eugene Van Tamelen House — Madison, Wisconsin (1956)
- Arnold Jackson House "Skyview" — moved from Madison (built 1957) to Beaver Dam, Wisconsin (in 1985).
- Donald C. Duncan House — moved from Lisle, Illinois, (built 1957) to Polymath Park, Westmoreland County, southwestern Pennsylvania (in 2002).
- Frank Iber House — Plover, Wisconsin (1957)
- Al Borah / Carl Post House — Barrington Hills, Illinois (1957)
- Catherine and William Cass House The Crimson Beech — Staten Island, New York (1959)
- Socrates Zaferiou House — Blauvelt, New York (built 1961)
- Joseph Mollica House — Wauwatosa, Wisconsin (1958)
- Dr. Edward & Laura Jane LaFond House — St. Joseph, Minnesota (1960)

== Prefab #2 ==
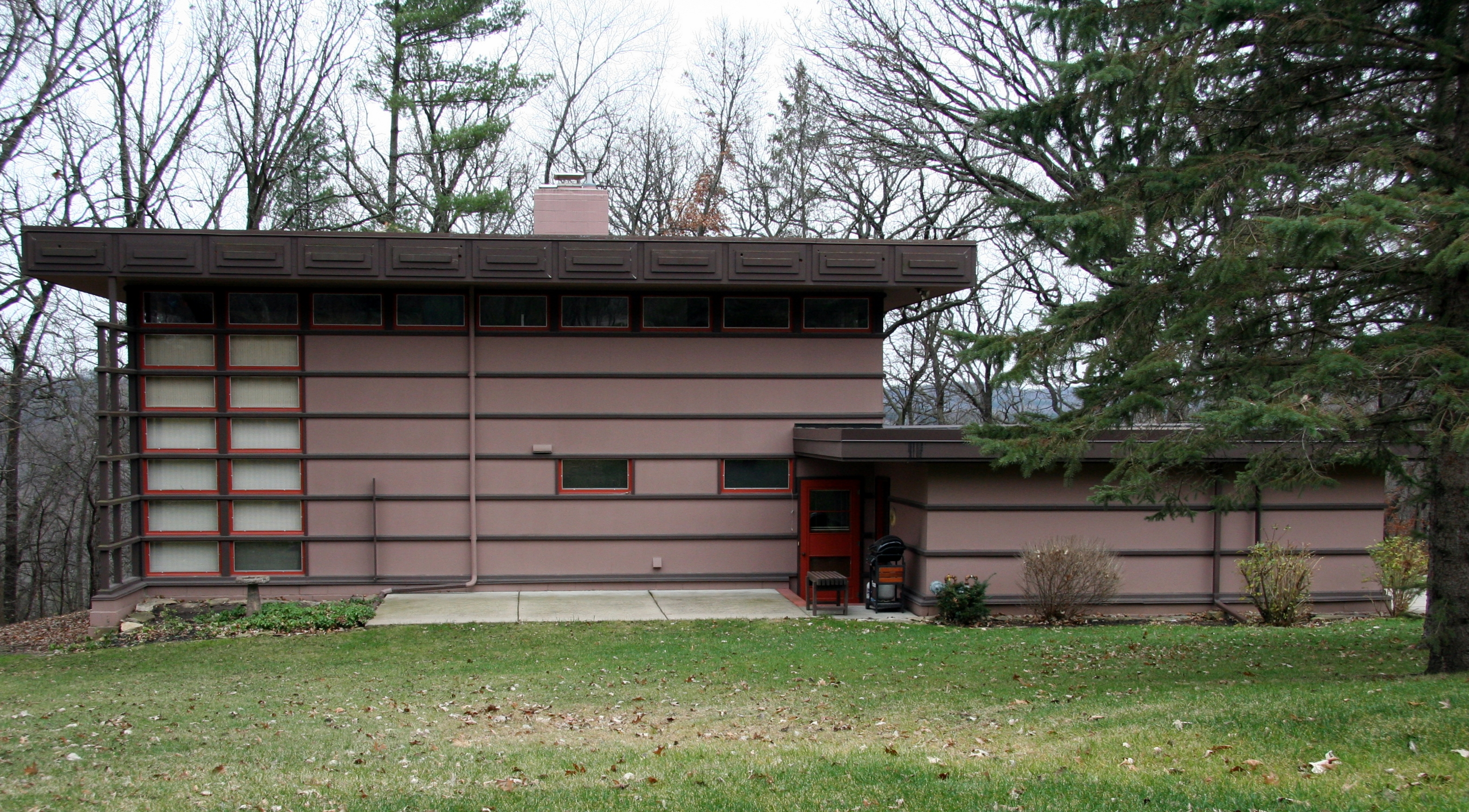
James McBean Residence

Prefab #2 was a square 2 story home with a flat roof. Its entry hall, kitchen, dining area, master bedroom, utility room, and living room are all on the first floor. The living room is a large, square 2-story space, glazed on one side by a wall of windows, and separated from the kitchen by a large concrete block fireplace. A stairway leads to a balcony and three second-story bedrooms.

The house is constructed from concrete block with horizontal board and batten siding. A row of windows just below the soffit make the chunky flat roof appear to float above the house. A carport attached to one corner of the house completes the design.

Prefab #2 Houses:

- Walter Rudin House – Madison, Wisconsin (1957)
- James McBean Residence – Rochester, Minnesota (1957)

Both houses have the same floor plan and vary only in minor details such as paint color and siting.

== Prefab #3 ==
- No examples of Prefab #3 houses were constructed.

== See also ==
- American System-Built Homes
- List of Frank Lloyd Wright works
