= Arnold Jackson House =

House in Madison, Wisconsin

Arnold and Lora Jackson House
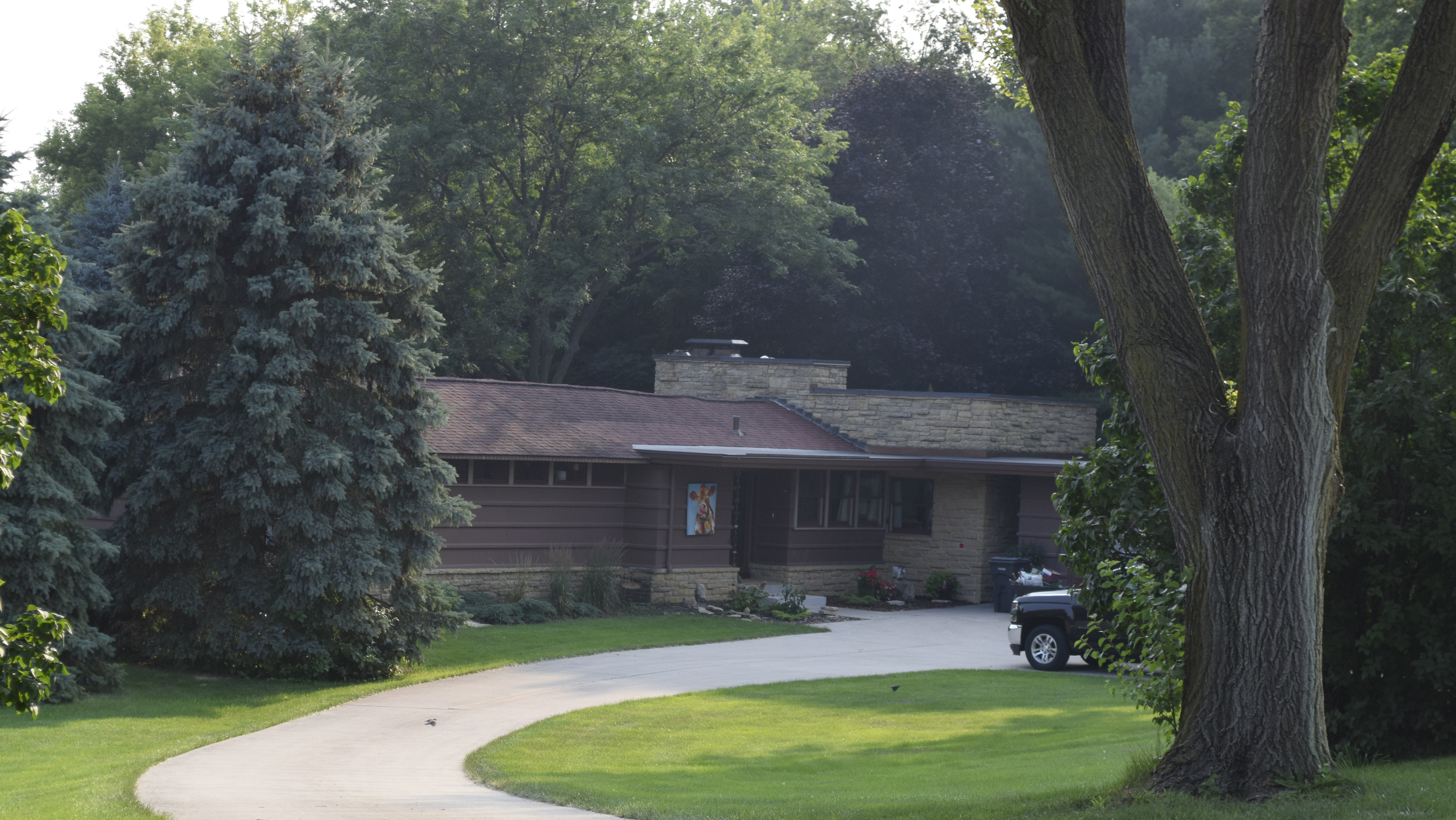
- The Arnold and Lora Jackson House, as rebuilt in Beaver Dam, WI
- Interactive map of the Arnold and Lora Jackson House area

General information
- Type: House
- Architectural style: Prefabricated; Prairie School
- Location: originally Bryant Road; Madison, Wisconsin; United States
- Coordinates: 43°28′20″N 88°46′18″W
- Construction started: 1957
- Relocated: 1985

Design and construction
- Architect: Frank Lloyd Wright
- Main contractor: Marshall Erdman

The Arnold and Lora Jackson House is a Frank Lloyd Wright-designed Marshall Erdman prefab building originally located on Bryant Road, Madison, Wisconsin. Dr. Arnold Jackson first met Wright after the latter sought treatment for a broken nose suffered in a fight on the streets of Madison in 1932, but the Jacksons only began discussing plans for a small house south of the city with Wright in 1950. After much back and forth, a prefabricated design was completed in 1957. It is the second of the nine examples of the first type (known as Prefab #1) of the Marshall Erdman Prefab Houses.

In 1955, Wright had begun working with Erdman on the design of a prefabricated house, and by 1956 Erdman had built a model of their first version (it was later purchased by Mr. and Mrs. van Tamelen). The Jacksons, who had been working with Erdman on construction cost estimates for Wright's custom design for them, saw the model and decided to order one for themselves in early 1957. They did request that Wright incorporate a basement in the design, which he was willing to do, since it would be exposed above grade on one side of the house. They also said they had to have an enclosed garage rather than an open carport. Wright agreed to this as well. The partially prefabricated house was completed in August 1957.

The house was a "deluxe" version of the model the Jacksons saw, and consisted of one wing with two bedrooms, two baths and a study, and another wing with living room and fireplace, dining room, kitchen ("workspace") and small family room off the kitchen. It was located on a hilltop, with views across the University of Wisconsin Arboretum and Lakes Wingra and Monona to the state capitol building in the distance. The Jacksons had previously put in some fruit trees and other plantings, and they spent their remaining years in the house.

Unfortunately, the sight closest to the house was the Madison "Beltline", a highway that circled the city. In 1950 it was a two-lane road, but over the years it became increasingly wider and busier. After the Jacksons died, the house was rented out, until a developer bought the property in 1982. Against the wishes of preservationists, the developer sold the house for one dollar, provided the buyer could move the building. It was subsequently relocated to a site outside of Beaver Dam, Wisconsin, about 35 miles away. It is currently listed in the Wisconsin Historical Society's Architecture and History Inventory.

== See also ==
- List of Frank Lloyd Wright works
