= Moore-McMillen House =

Historic house in Staten Island, New York

- U.S. National Register of Historic Places
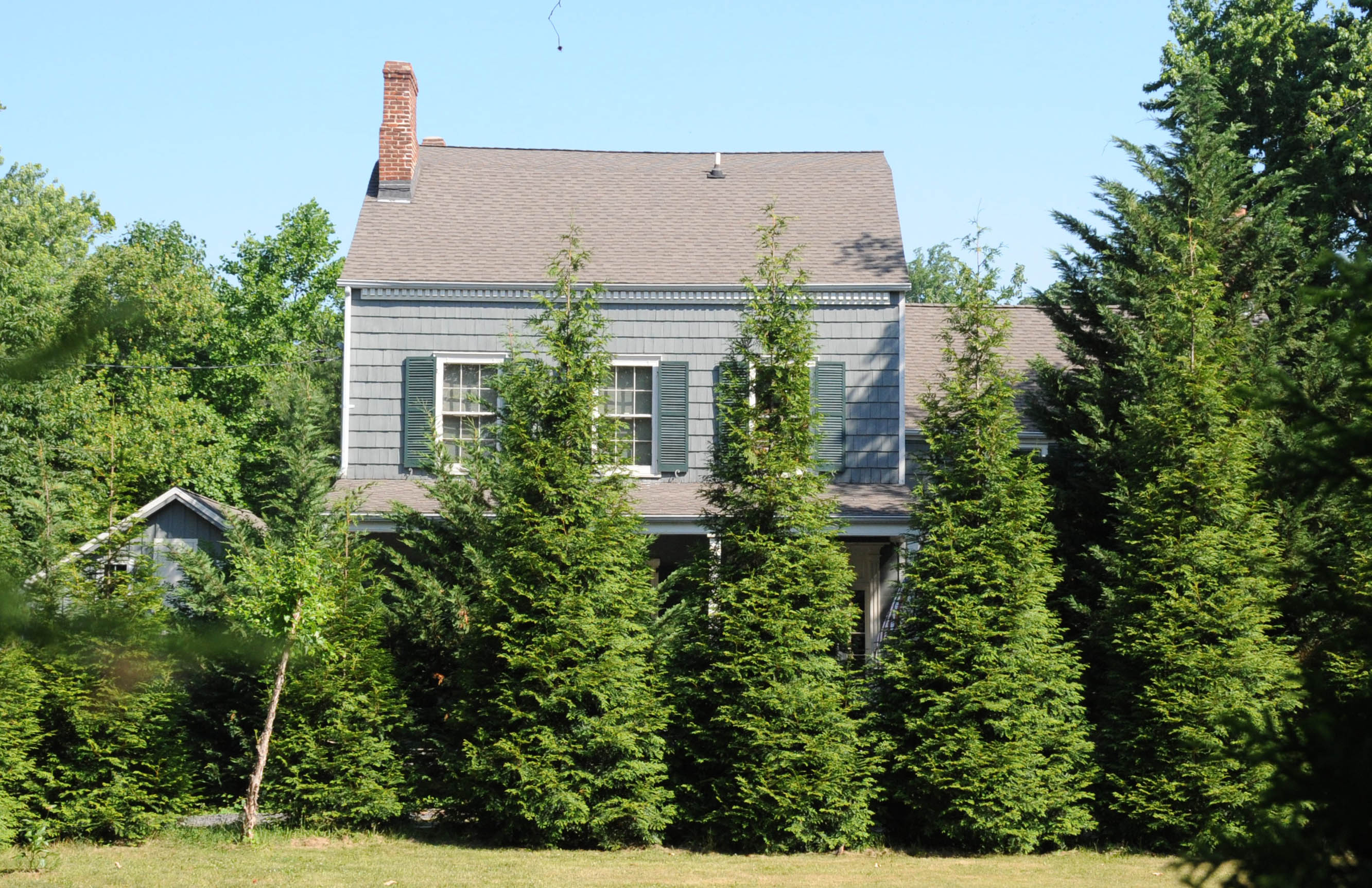

- Location within New York City Location within New York Location within the United States
- Location: 3531 Richmond Rd., Staten Island, New York
- Coordinates: 40°34′23″N 74°8′19″W
- Area: less than one acre
- Built: 1818
- Architect: Episcopal Church of St. Andrew
- Architectural style: Federal
- NRHP reference No.: 80002760
- Added to NRHP: April 23, 1980

Moore-McMillen House is a historic home located at Egbertville, Staten Island, New York. It was built in 1818 as the rectory for the Church of St. Andrew. It is a modest, two-story frame farmhouse set on a fieldstone foundation with a gambrel roof. It features a small covered porch along the length of the main section.

It was added to the National Register of Historic Places in 1980.
