= Richmond Creek (Fresh Kills) =

Urban stream in Staten Island, New York

Coordinates: 40°34′6.45″N 74°10′34.21″W

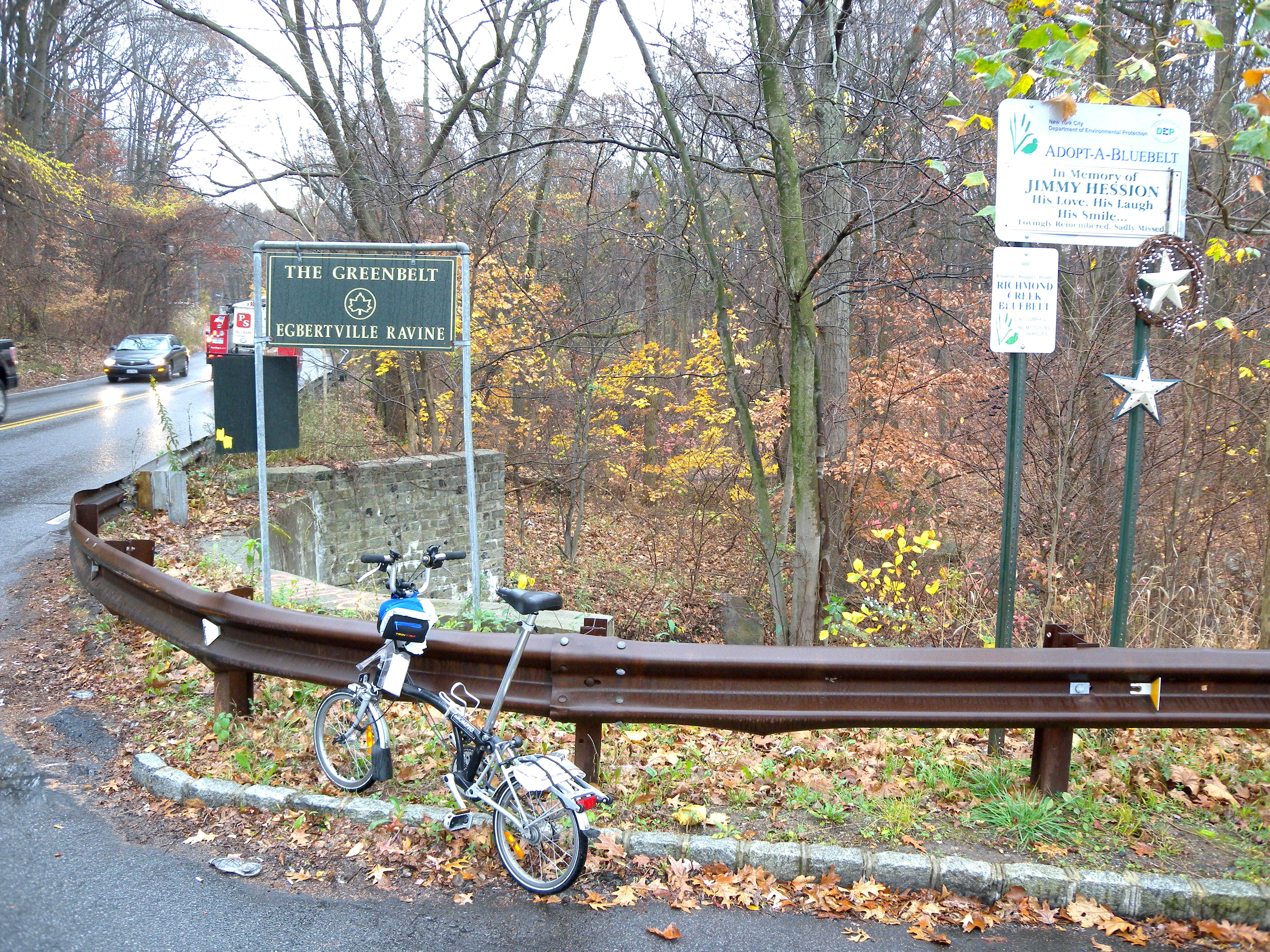
Manor Road and Rockland Avenue

Richmond Creek is a major stream in Staten Island, New York City. Its upper drainage basin includes the remote forested hills in the center of the island. It empties into the Fresh Kills.

Its source is Ohrbach Lake, located on the grounds of the Pouch Camp, maintained by the Boy Scouts of America. From there, it enters the Greenbelt, crossing underneath the intersection of Manor Road and Rockland Avenue. It enters the Egbertville Ravine, then emerges from the ravine and flows along the east side of Lighthouse Hill. There, it skims the western edge of the Richmondtown neighborhood and through Historic Richmond Town. South of Richmondtown, it emerges into a wide floodplain that has been designated as part of Staten Island's Bluebelt, a region of protected wetlands. It flows under Richmond Avenue south of the Staten Island Mall, and flows into the Fresh Kills alongside the former Fresh Kills Landfill and the developing Freshkills Park.

In colonial times and in the early 19th century, the creek was used to operate up to 11 mills in the center of the island. One such mill is being restored along the creek in Historic Richmond Town.

In late 2017, a family of beavers moved into the creek, cut down over 100 trees, and contributed to local flooding. DEP destroyed a small dam, but the beavers repaired it overnight. The beaver, the state mammal, enjoys protected status, complicating efforts at population control.

== See also ==
- List of New York rivers
