= Marshall Erdman =

Lithuanian-American architect

- Born: Mausas Erdmanas; September 29, 1922; Tverai, Lithuania
- Died: September 17, 1995 (aged 72); Madison, Wisconsin
- Education: University of Wisconsin–Madison
- Occupation: Architect
- Practice: Marshall Erdman & Associates

Marshall Erdman (September 29, 1922 – September 17, 1995) was a Lithuanian-American builder and colleague of Frank Lloyd Wright.

== Life ==
=== Early life ===
Erdman was born Mausas Erdmanas on September 29, 1922, in Tverai, Lithuania. He emigrated to the United States at age 17 to live with an uncle in Chicago.

=== Education ===
Following high school, Erdman studied architecture at the University of Illinois at Urbana-Champaign. He joined the United States Army Corps of Engineers in 1943, where he helped build the Remagen pontoon bridge. He returned to his studies after the war, receiving a B.S. in Political Science from the University of Wisconsin–Madison in 1946.

=== Career ===
Erdman started a construction company in 1946, which he incorporated in 1951 as Marshall Erdman & Associates. An integrated healthcare design-build company, Marshall Erdman & Associates grew rapidly, expanding into six different markets throughout the U.S. In early 2008, Marshall Erdman & Associates was purchased by Cogdell Spencer, a healthcare real estate investment trust, for $247 million. This part of Marshall's legacy is now traded on the NYSE as CSA.

In addition to founding Marshall Erdman & Associates, he introduced U-Form-It prefabricated house kits to the market in 1953 and Techline office furniture in 1969.

=== Legacy ===
The Middleton Hills neighborhood in Middleton, Wisconsin had its first homes completed in 1996. This development is considered a Neo-traditional design.

== Family ==
Erdman married Joyce Mickey (1924–1992), a UW-Madison student, in 1946, with whom he had four children. Erdman cut off ties to his remaining family members after marrying Mickey.

== Work ==
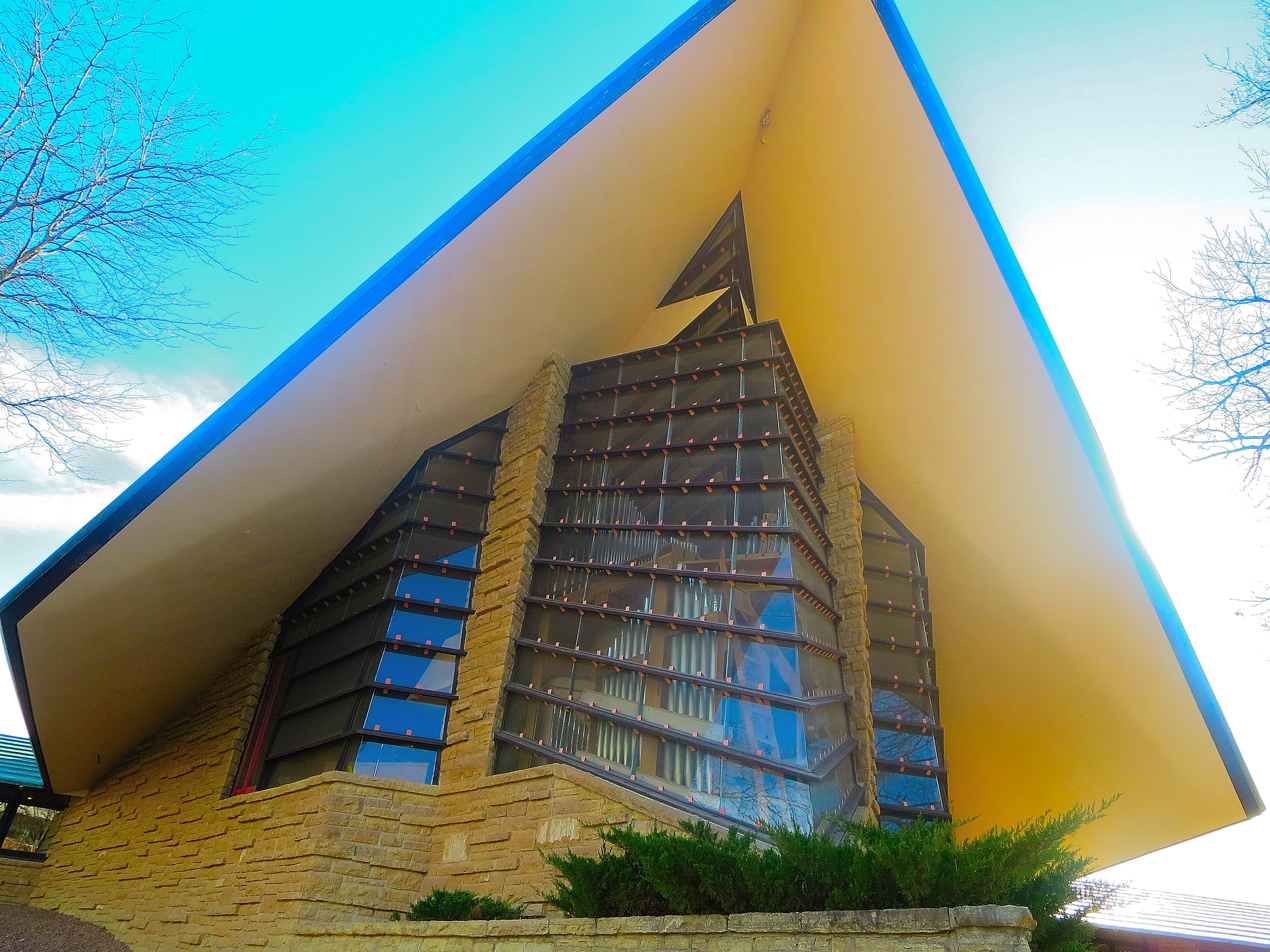
Unitarian Meeting House, Shorewood Hills, Wisconsin

=== Projects ===
- 1949–1950: First Unitarian Society of Madison, designed by Frank Lloyd Wright
- 1956–1961: Marshall Erdman Prefab Houses, designed by Frank Lloyd Wright
- 1956–1967: medical offices at Doctor's Park, Madison, designed by William Kaeser
- 196x: Doctor's Park, Appleton
- 1957: Arnold Jackson House (Skyview), designed by Frank Lloyd Wright
- 1957: Wyoming Valley School, designed by Frank Lloyd Wright
- 1958: Faith Baptist Church, designed by Herb Fritz
- 1959: 100 homes in Sherman Village, Madison
- 1965–1966: Peace Corps camps at St. Croix and St. Thomas, Virgin Islands.
- 1965: medical office building, Georgetown, Massachusetts
- 1974: first modular medical building, Delbarton, West Virginia
- 1975: first Marshfield Clinic building
- 1989: Charlotte Memorial Hospital
- 1993: Middleton Hills planned community, Middleton, Wisconsin
