= Lighthouse Hill, Staten Island =

Neighborhood in New York City

Coordinates: 40°34′41″N 74°08′06″W

Lighthouse Hill is the name of a hill, and the neighborhood situated thereon, in the New York City borough of Staten Island. Lighthouse Hill is situated to the north of Richmondtown, south of Todt Hill, and west of Grant City.

Formerly known as Richmond Hill (and not to be confused with the neighborhood of the same name in the borough of Queens), Lighthouse Hill acquired its present name when the Staten Island Range Light, towering 141 feet (43 m) above the Lower New York Bay, was built there in 1912. Its original light could be seen as far as 21 miles (34 km) away. The former name of Richmond Hill survives in Richmond Hill Road, located at the southern edge of the hill.

Lighthouse Hill is the southernmost of the chain of hills that radiate from the northeast corner of Staten Island and separate its East Shore from the region behind the hills, usually referred to as Mid-Island by island residents. Richmond Creek flows near the bottom of the hill's eastern ridge, and it is surrounded on all sides by parks belonging to the Staten Island Greenbelt, with the LaTourette Golf Course at the hill's southern margin.

== Features ==
Like the other hilltop neighborhoods of Staten Island, Lighthouse Hill is noted for having some of the most opulent homes on Staten Island, rivaled only in grandeur by the Todt Hill neighborhood. In addition to the commanding views of historic Richmondtown and New York Harbor, Lighthouse Hill is also the site of the following notable locations: The Jacques Marchais Museum of Tibetan Art is the oldest Himalayan style architecture in the United States, and it is listed on the National Register of Historic Places. The Crimson Beech is the only residence in New York City designed by Frank Lloyd Wright, and it was declared a landmark in 1990. The LaTourette House, built as a farmhouse in 1836, now serves as the clubhouse for LaTourette Golf Course, and was added to the National Register of Historic Places in 1982.

== Demographics ==
For census purposes, the New York City Department of City Planning classifies Lighthouse Hill as part of a larger Neighborhood Tabulation Area called Todt Hill-Emerson Hill-Lighthouse Hill-Manor Heights SI0203. This designated neighborhood had 32,822 inhabitants based on data from the 2020 United States Census. This was an increase of 1,971 persons (6.4%) from the 30,851 counted in 2010. The neighborhood had a population density of 7.8 inhabitants per acre (14,500/sq mi; 5,600/km^{2}).

The racial makeup of the neighborhood was 62.8% (20,597) White (Non-Hispanic), 4.1% (1,348) Black (Non-Hispanic), 19.8% (6,486) Asian, and 3% (971) from two or more races. Hispanic or Latino of any race were 10.4% (3,420) of the population.

According to the 2020 United States Census, this area has many cultural communities of over 1,000 inhabitants. This include residents who identify as Puerto Rican, German, Irish, Italian, Indian, and Chinese.

The largest age group was people 55-74 years old, which made up 24.9% of the residents. 75.1% of the households had at least one family present. Out of the 10,623 households, 57.1% had a married couple (22.4% with a child under 18), 3.1% had a cohabiting couple (1.2% with a child under 18), 14.3% had a single male (1.6% with a child under 18), and 25.4% had a single female (3.9% with a child under 18). 32.7% of households had children under 18. In this neighborhood, 30.3% of non-vacant housing units are renter-occupied.

== Notable people ==
Some notable residents include Edward Arlington Robinson (poet), best known for his poem "Richard Corey" (a staple in American high school and college literature classes). During his stay at LaTourette, Edward Arlington Robinson corresponded with Kermit Roosevelt, son of President Theodore Roosevelt. In his letters to Kermit Roosevelt, Robinson lauded the President for helping the poet obtain a job at the United States Customs House in Manhattan, which was essentially a "no-show" job that enabled Robinson to support himself while he wrote poetry. Robinson, by his own admission, wrote his least popular works - i.e., the plays "Van Zorn" and "Porcuipine" - while staying at LaTourette.

Arthur Anderson, a radio, TV, and film personality who is best known as the "Voice of the Lucky Charms Leprechaun" lived on Edinboro Road for the first twelve years of his life. Anderson worked with Orson Welles in the Mercury Theatre and the radio series The Mercury Theatre on the Air which featured Shakepearean classics.

Modernist painter Henry Fitch Taylor, a student of Claude Monet, lived in the LaTourette House from 1913 to 1915 with his wife, Clara Sidney Davidge. Mrs. Davidge is credited with organizing the first Armory Show in 1913 in which the American public was exposed to the European Impressionists. Her husband was also featured at the Armory Show.

== Transportation ==
Lighthouse Hill is served by the S54, S74 and S84 local buses and the SIM15 express bus on Richmond Road.

== See also ==
- Lighthouses in the United States
