= First Unitarian Society of Madison =

Historic church in Wisconsin, United States

- First Unitarian Society Meeting House
- U.S. National Register of Historic Places
- U.S. National Historic Landmark
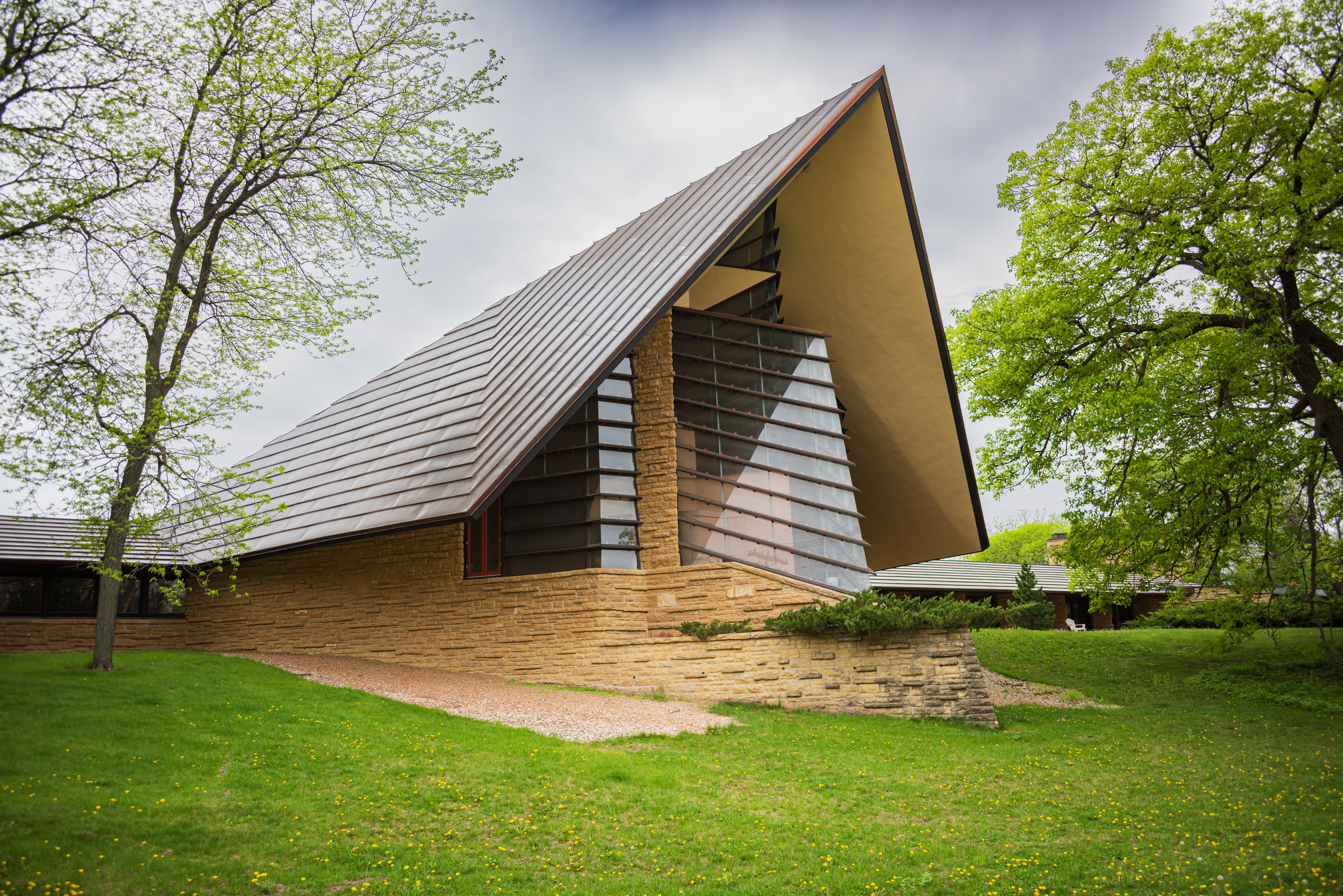
- First Unitarian Meeting House

- Location within Wisconsin Location within the United States
- Interactive map showing the First Unitarian Society Meeting House’s location
- Location: 900 University Bay Dr., Shorewood Hills, Wisconsin
- Coordinates: 43°4′33.2″N 89°26′6.65″W
- Area: 4 acres (1.6 ha)
- Built: 1949–1951
- Architect: Frank Lloyd Wright; Marshall Erdman
- Architectural style: Modern Movement
- NRHP reference No.: 73000076

Significant dates
- Added to NRHP: April 11, 1973
- Designated NHL: August 18, 2004

The First Unitarian Society of Madison (FUS) is a Unitarian Universalist congregation in Shorewood Hills, Wisconsin, United States. Its meeting house was designed by Frank Lloyd Wright and built by Marshall Erdman in 1949–1951, and has been designated a National Historic Landmark for its architecture. With over 1,000 members, it is one of the country's ten largest Unitarian Universalist congregations.

== Beliefs ==
The First Unitarian Society of Madison is part of the Unitarian Universalist Association and affirms the Seven Principles and Six Sources. The Society also adheres to the Continuing Bond of Union established at their founding in 1879 and reaffirmed in 1980:

"We whose names are hereunto inscribed, desiring a religious organization in the spirit of Jesus of Nazareth, which shall make integrity of life its first aim and leave thought free, associate ourselves together as the First Unitarian Society of Madison and accept to its membership those of whatever theological opinion who wish to unite with us in the promotion of truth, righteousness, reverence, and charity among all. As part of a non-creedal tradition, the First Unitarian Society of Madison welcomes all regardless of creed, religion, sexual orientation, gender identity, race, ethnicity, and ability."

== History ==
The First Unitarian Society of Madison was established in 1879 shortly after the 1878 Session of the Wisconsin Conference of Unitarian & Independent Churches led to a resurgence of the Unitarians in Madison. Influenced greatly by the Reverend Jenkin Lloyd Jones, a prominent Unitarian minister (and Frank Lloyd Wright's uncle), the early members held that an ethical rather than theological agreement was the hallmark of Unitarianism.

The Reverend Henry M. Simmons was called as the Society's first settled minister shortly after its founding, but departed within two years. Shortly after his departure, the Reverend Joseph Henry Crooker took over as the called minister and led the congregation in establishing their first building in 1885 which was designed by Peabody and Stearns of Boston. During Crooker's tenure, the congregation experienced significant growth in their Sunday School program, in addition to establishing the Women's Alliance, the Channing Club (a university student group), the Lend-A-Hand Club, and the Contemporary Club (a current topics discussion group).

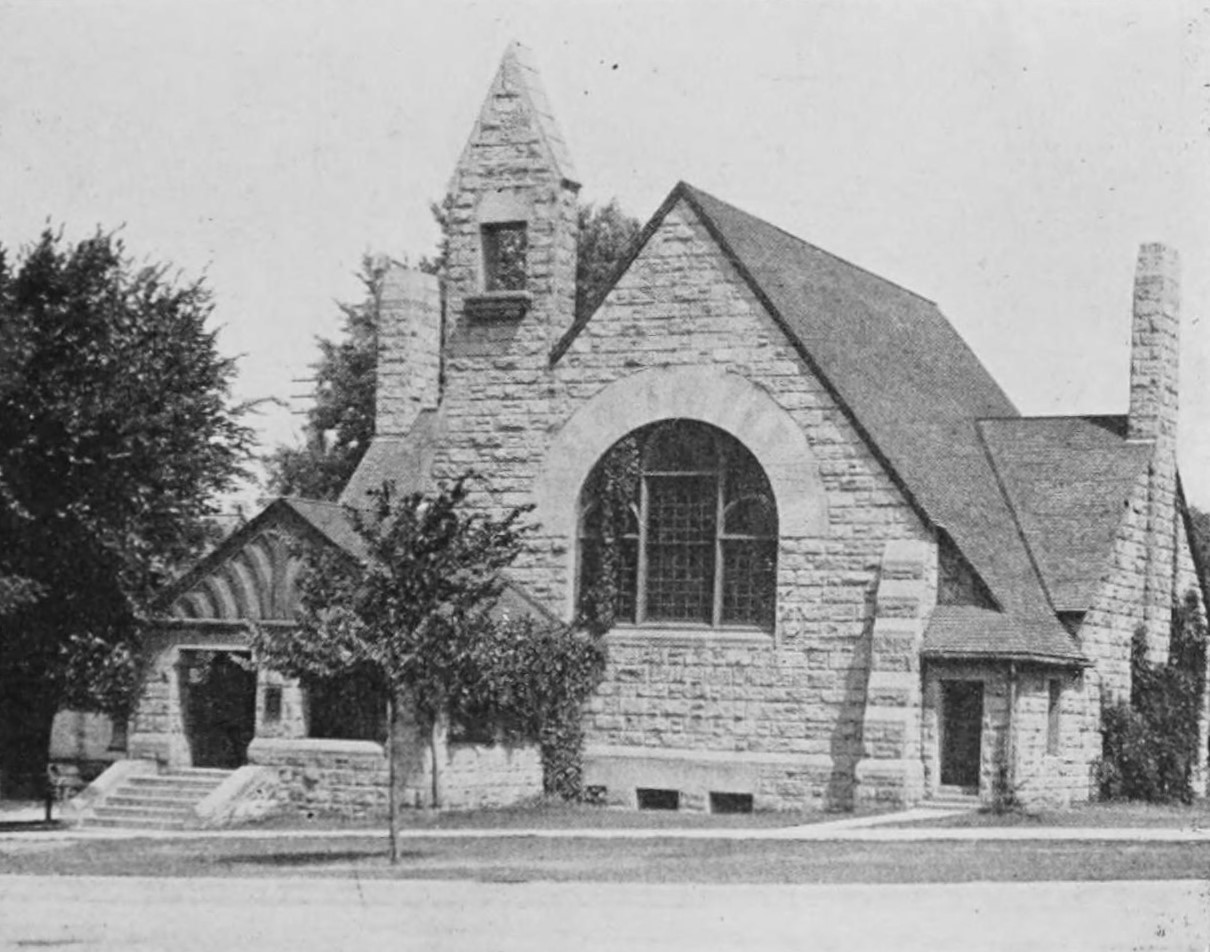
1885 church designed by Peabody and Stearns.

By 1910 there were 105 pledging units on the roster (a pledging unit can be an individual donor or a family donor), but by 1940 only 48 pledging units were recorded with the decline attributed to dissent among members. In 1941, the Reverend Kenneth Patton was called to serve as minister and the Society's membership nearly doubled in a few years.

In 1945, the Society elected to sell their original buildings after receiving a substantial offer for the property originally located in downtown Madison. The following year, after much debate, the Society commissioned Frank Lloyd Wright to design the new Meeting House. Four acres of land in Shorewood Hills, surrounded by few structures and overlooking the University of Wisconsin agricultural fields, was purchased as the new site. The new building opened in 1951. Today, the University of Wisconsin hospital and a busy University Avenue surround the Meeting House.

The Reverend Max D. Gaebler served as the settled minister for 35 years. In 1988, the Reverend Michael A. Schuler was called as the settled minister and retired in 2018 after 30 years of dedicated service. Under the leadership and tenures of both the Reverend Gaebler and Schuler, the Society experienced significant growth and presently registers over 1,500 Members and Affiliates. In 2008, a LEED Gold–certified atrium addition was built on the campus to accommodate the increase in membership.

In 2021, the congregation chose to move from a hierarchical leadership model to a shared ministry model. Rooted in justice and Unitarian Universalist values, this model places equal weight on all aspects of congregational ministry. In May 2021, the congregation called the Rev. Kelly Weisman Asprooth-Jackson to join the Rev. Kelly J. Crocker. Together, they each serve as Co-Senior Minister.

=== Shaarei Shamayim ===
Since 2008, the Shaarei Shamayim congregation, which adheres to Reconstructionist Judaism, has shared the building with the 1952 First Unitarian Society.

== Architecture ==
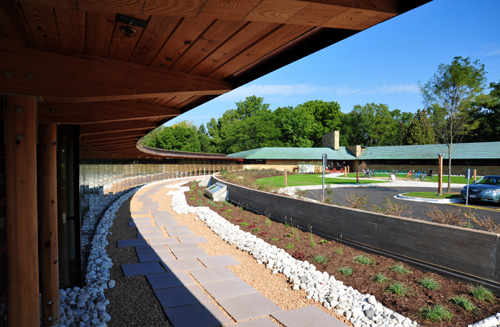
Addition to the First Unitarian Society Meeting House, Shorewood Hills, Wisconsin completed in 2008

The society is housed in the historic Unitarian Meeting House, which was designed by Frank Lloyd Wright, one of its members and the son of two of its founders. Wright was commissioned to design the Meeting House in 1946. The dramatic result has been variously interpreted as the prow of a ship, a plow cutting through the prairie, and hands folded in prayer.

Construction began in 1949 and was completed in 1951. Wright initially estimated $60,000 to build the church, but it cost three times that. To cut the cost, members of the congregation hauled limestone blocks for the walls. The church's "upper meeting house", the original Wright design, is characterized by its prow-like roof, covered with a blue-green standing seam copper, set with a combination of vertical and horizontal seams to emphasize the roof's shape. The roof is supported by an innovative series of hinged-arch trusses built out of two-by-four and two-by-six framing members. There is no ridge pole, although there is the appearance of one both inside and outside; the roof is effectively supported by the main roof section being counterbalanced by the extended eaves. The system allows for an interior span of 64 feet (20 m) without supports.

The church building is recognized as one of the most innovative examples of church architecture. In 1960, the American Institute of Architects designated it one of 17 buildings to be retained as an example of Wright's contribution to American culture. The Meeting House was placed on the National Register of Historic Places in 1973, before the traditional 50-year cutoff for historic buildings. In 2004, it was designated a National Historic Landmark by the National Park Service.

Additions to the building designed by Taliesin Associated Architects were added in 1965 and 1990. Construction of a major expansion of the FUS campus, designed by Kubala Washatko Architects, was completed in 2008, adding a second, 500-seat auditorium and community spaces. Extensive repairs and restoration were also done on the historic building. This expansion conforms to strict guidelines to leave the historic parts of the grounds unaltered.

Wright designed the structure around triangles, and after it was built he wrote: "As the square has always signified integrity and the sphere universality, the triangle stands for aspiration. Here is a church where the whole edifice is in the attitude of prayer."

In the early 1970s, the "Friends of the Meeting House" was created in order to manage preservation of the facility. Friends of the Meeting House, Inc. is a 501(c)(3) non-profit, non-stock organization. Its purpose is education, assisting the congregation with preservation projects, and advocating for preservation of the building's unique features.

== Gallery ==
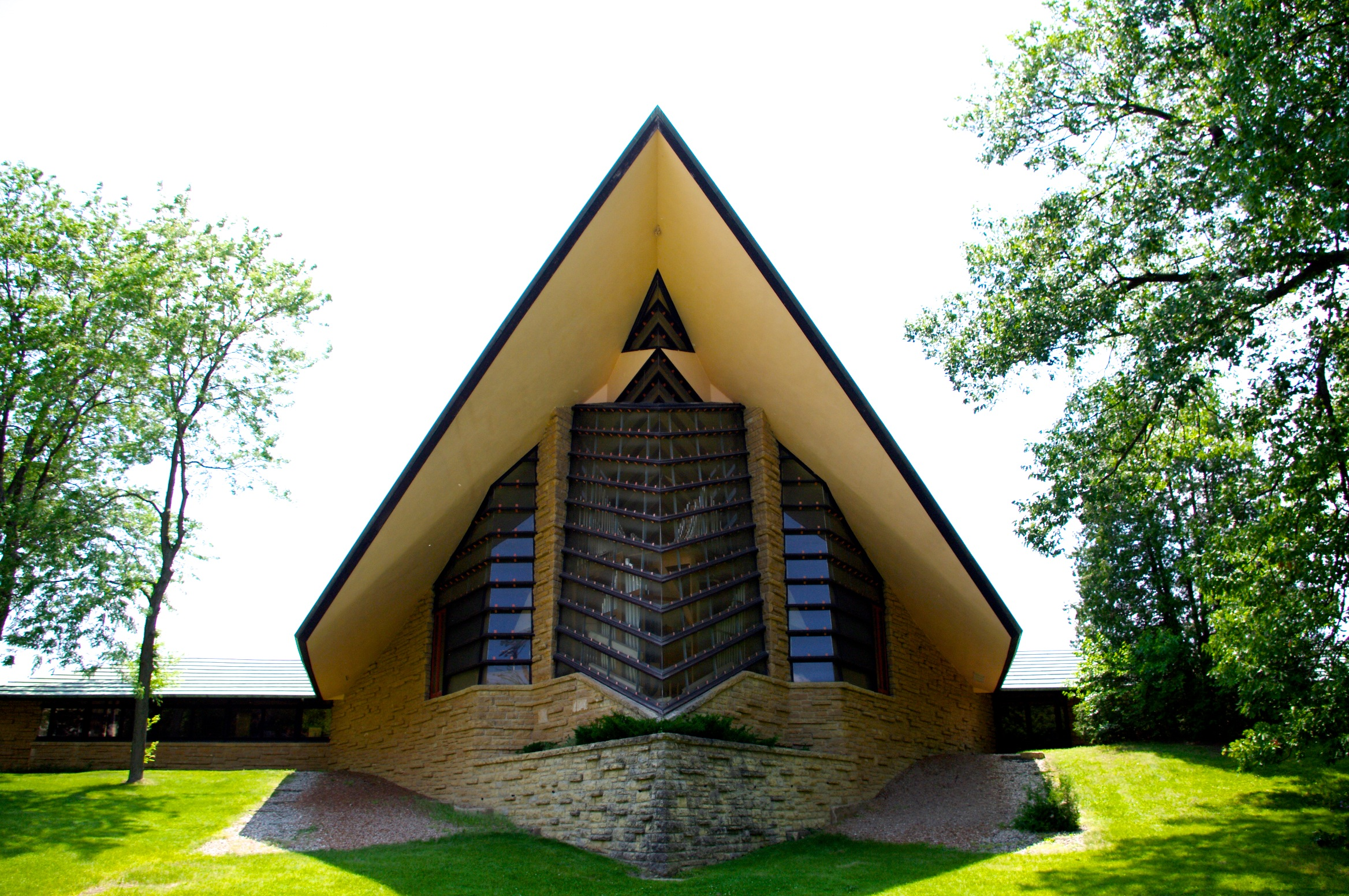

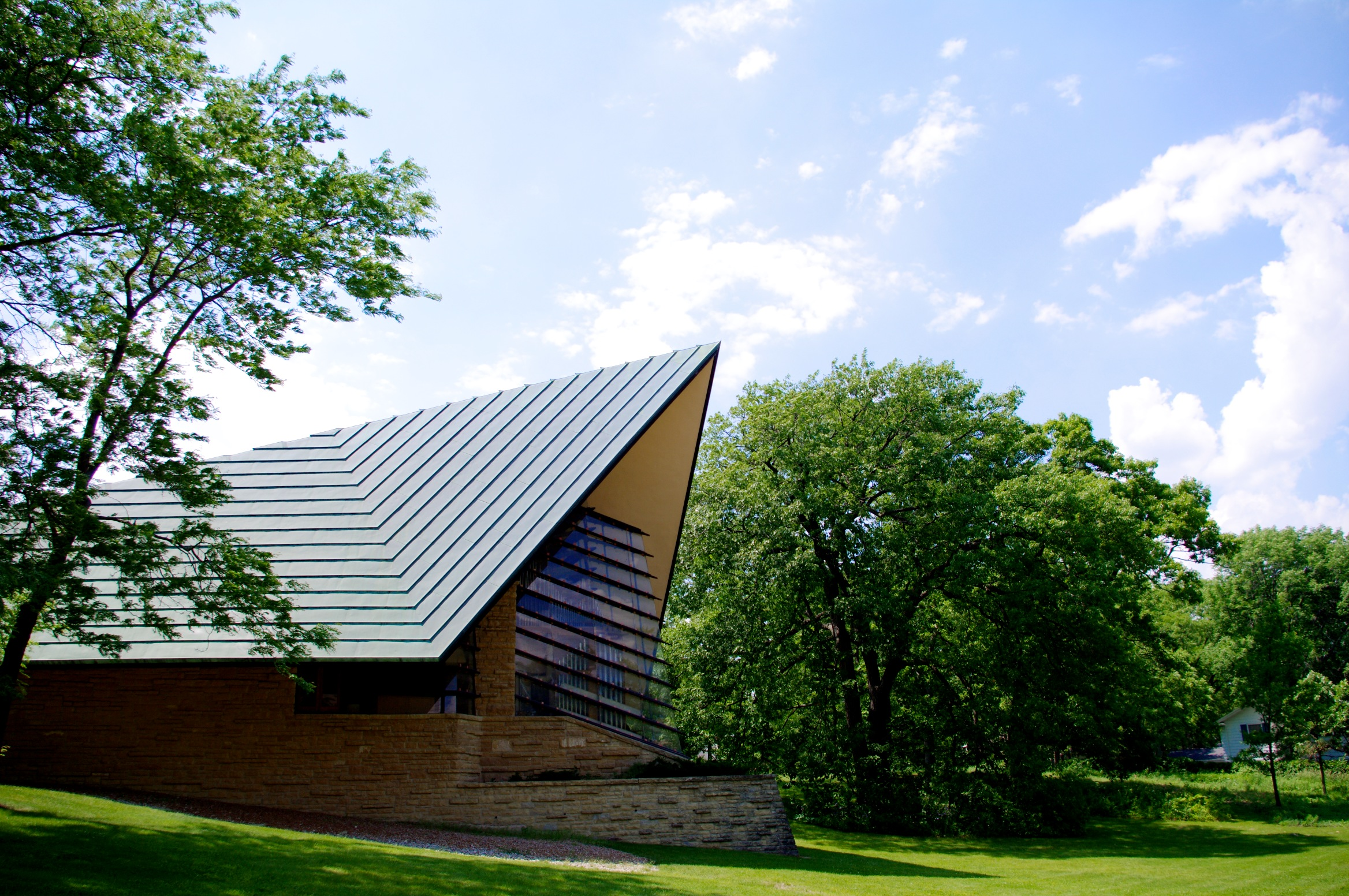

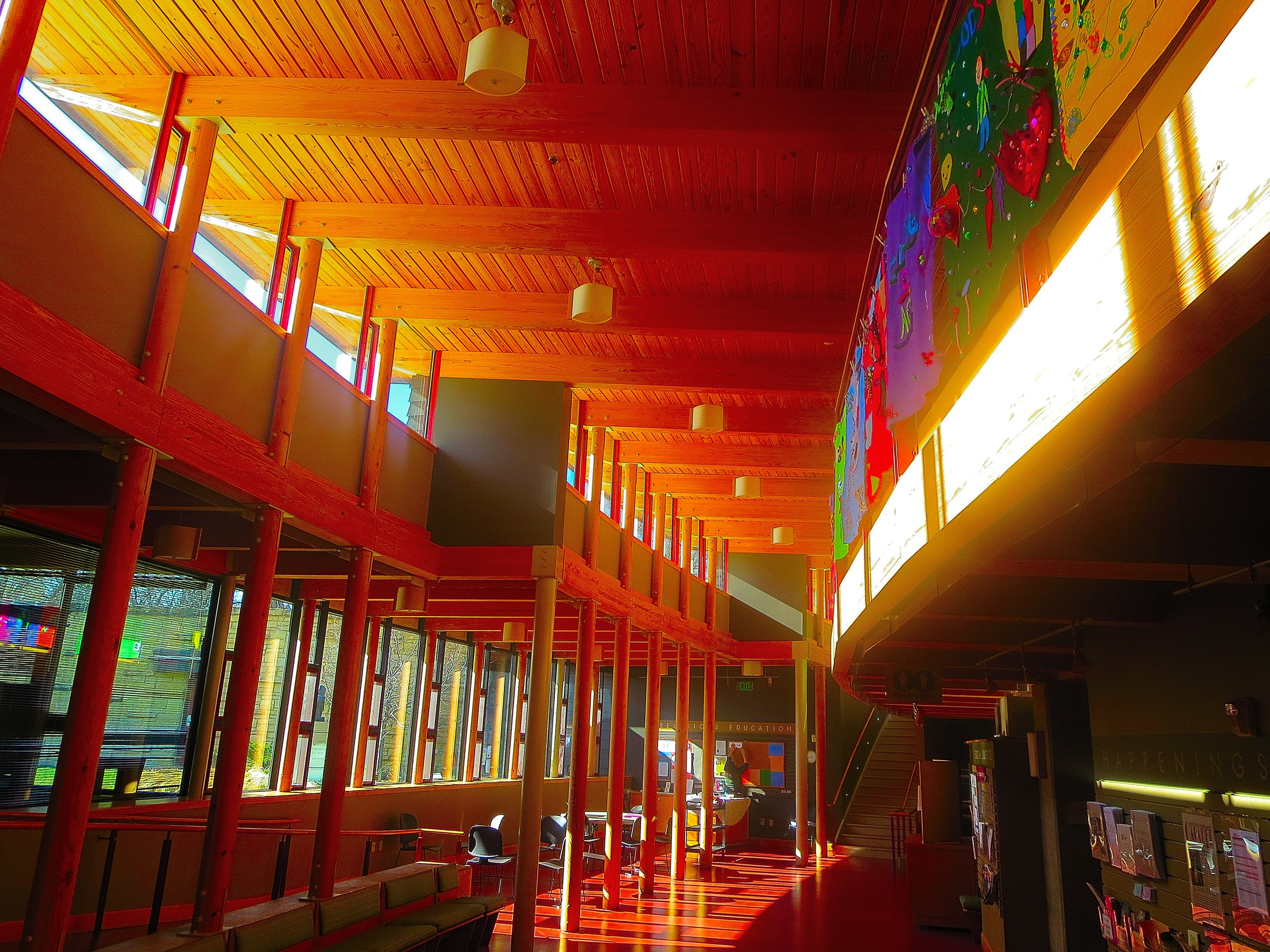

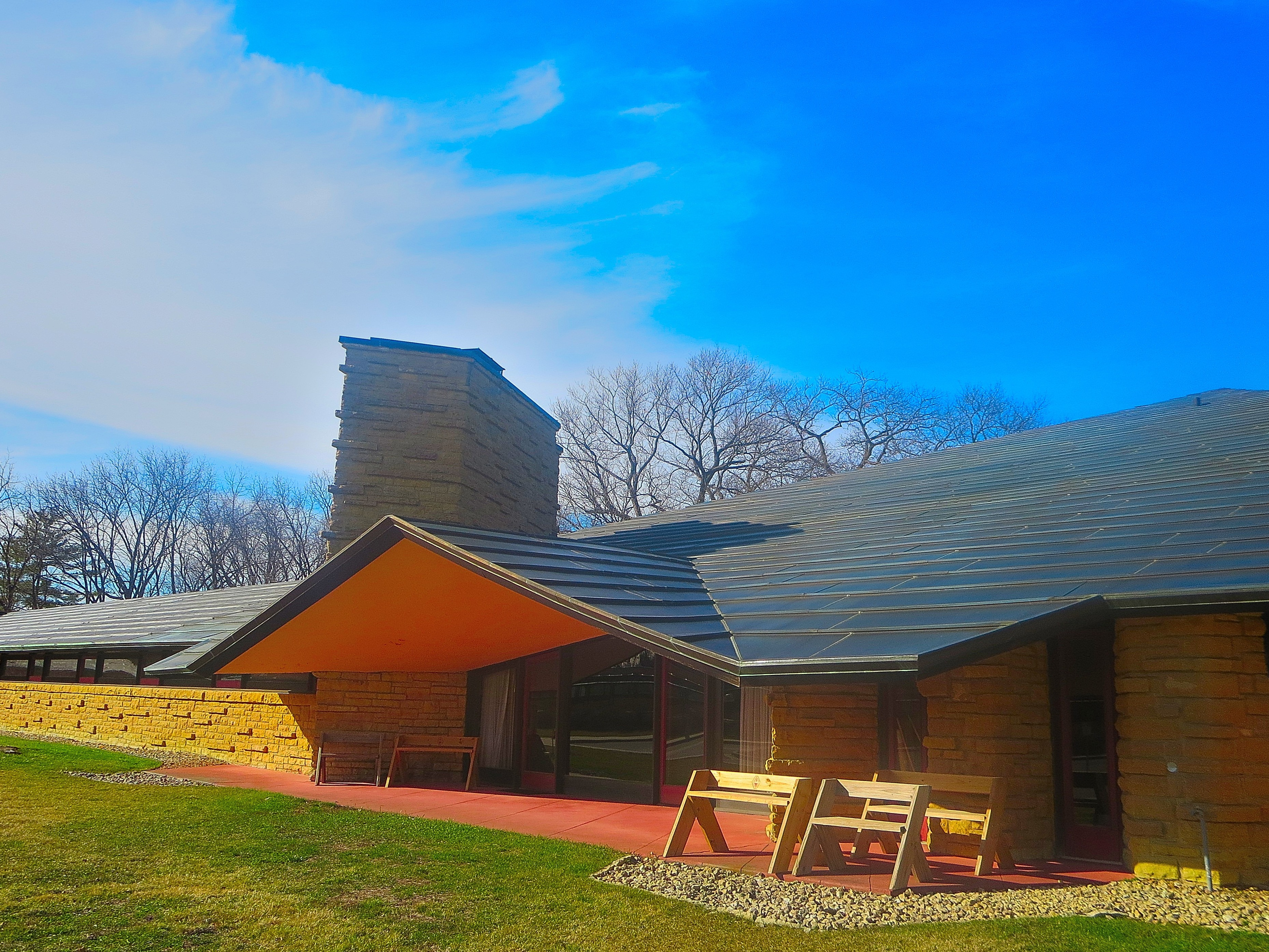

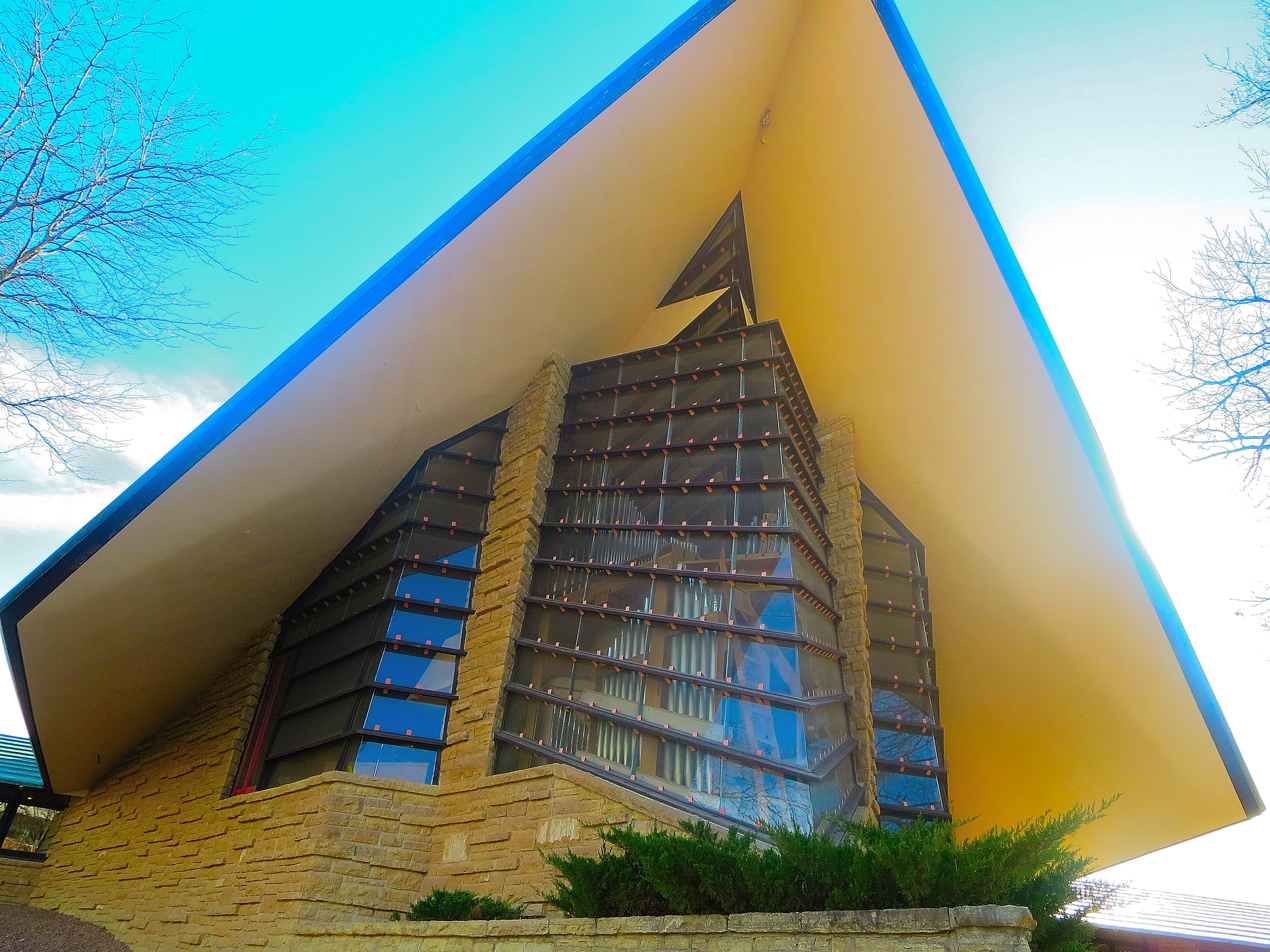

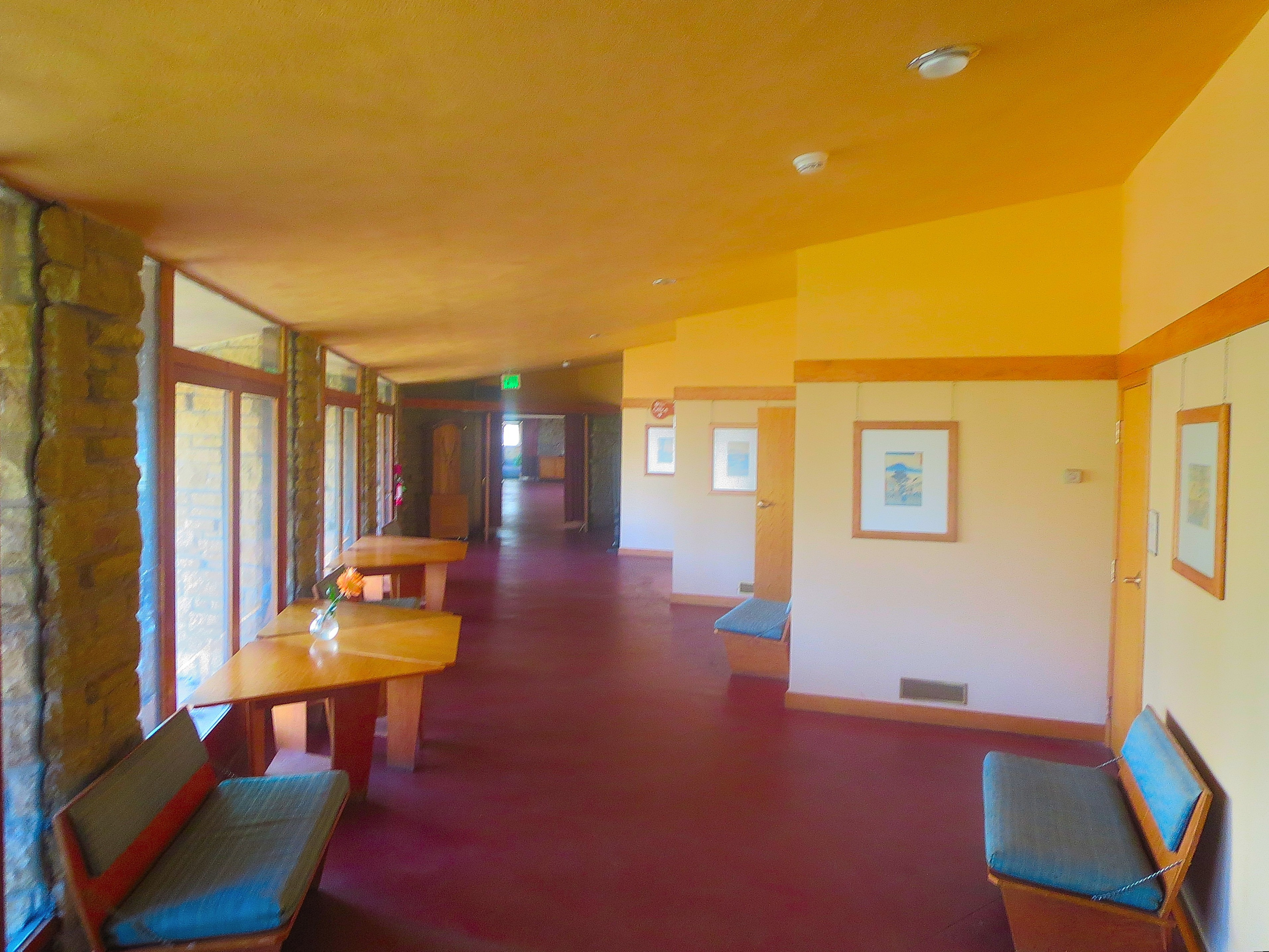

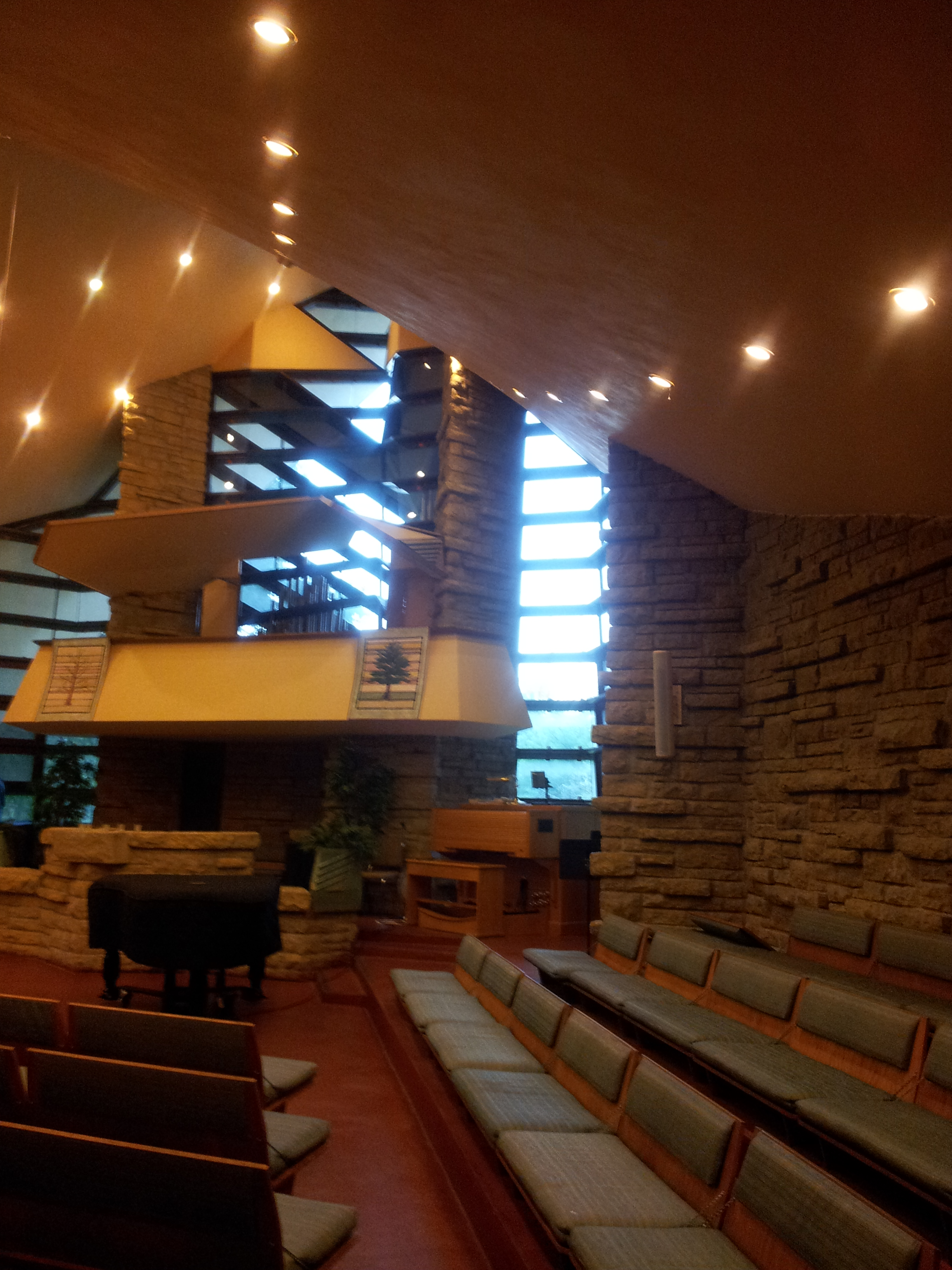

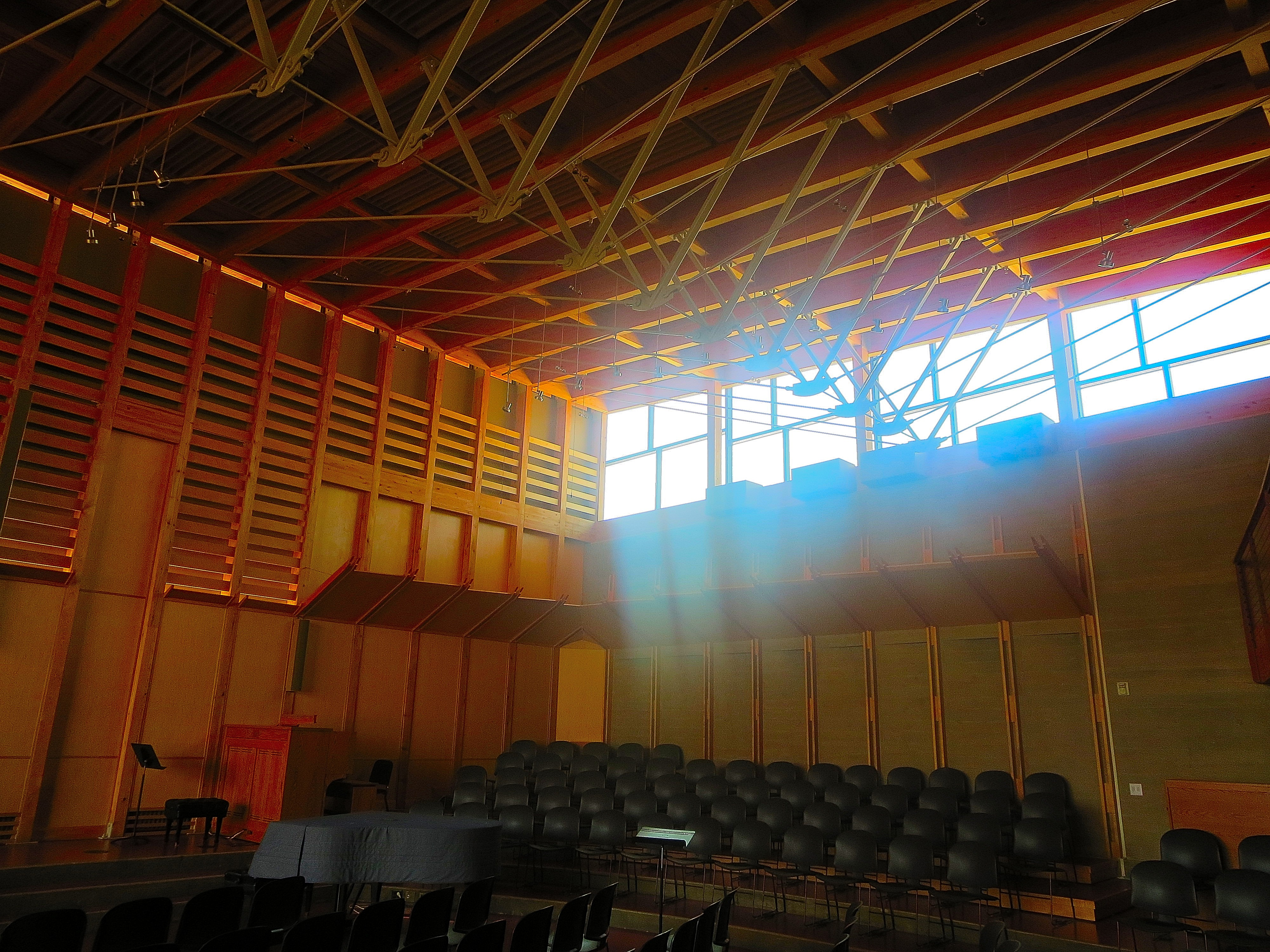

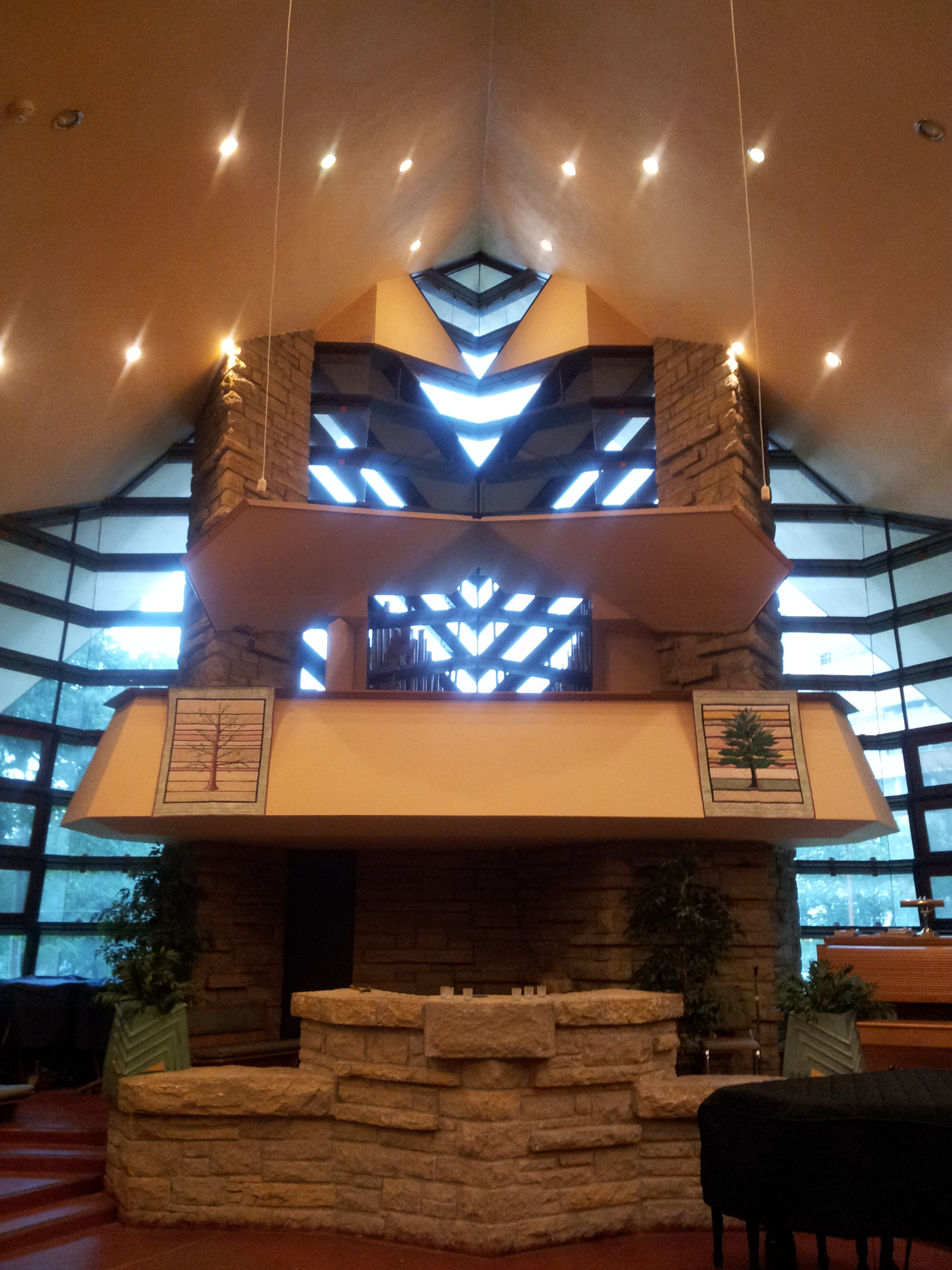

== See also ==
- List of Frank Lloyd Wright works
- National Register of Historic Places listings in Dane County, Wisconsin
- List of National Historic Landmarks in Wisconsin
