= Ennis House =

Historic house in Los Angeles, California

- U.S. National Register of Historic Places
- California Historical Landmark
- Los Angeles Historic-Cultural Monument

- Location within the Los Angeles metropolitan area Location within California Location within the United States
- Location: 2607–2655 Glendower Avenue; Los Angeles, California
- Coordinates: 34°06′58″N 118°17′34″W
- Built: 1924
- Architect: Frank Lloyd Wright
- Architectural style: Mayan Revival, Textile Block
- NRHP reference No.: 71000145
- CHISL No.: 1011
- LAHCM No.: 149

Significant dates
- Added to NRHP: October 14, 1971
- Designated LAHCM: March 3, 1976

The Ennis House (also the Ennis–Brown House) is a residence at 2607–2655 Glendower Avenue in the Los Feliz neighborhood of Los Angeles in California, United States. Designed by the architect Frank Lloyd Wright in the Mayan Revival style for the businessman Charles Ennis and his wife Mabel, it was completed in 1925 on top of a hill in Los Feliz. The house is the largest of four concrete textile block houses that Wright designed in Greater Los Angeles in the 1920s, the others being La Miniatura, the Storer House, and the Freeman House. The house has frequently been used as a filming location—appearing in films such as Blade Runner—in part because of its design and proximity to Hollywood. The Ennis House is a Los Angeles Historic-Cultural Monument and California Historical Landmark, and it is listed on the National Register of Historic Places.

The Ennis House was built at a time when Wright was transitioning away from the Prairie-style designs of his early career and toward the Usonian designs of his later career. It consists of a main building and a garage wing, separated by a motor court and connected by a footbridge; all these structures are surrounded by a high retaining wall. The structure includes at least 24,000 concrete textile blocks, which are decorated with engraved patterns. There are also stained glass windows and ziggurat-like roofs. The main house's interior has around 6,000 square feet (560 m^{2}) of space, with three bedrooms and three and a half bathrooms; there is an additional bedroom in the garage wing. The entrance hall is beneath the main floor, in contrast to Wright's other spaces. The interiors are decorated with chandeliers, marble floors, mosaic tiles, exposed ceiling beams, and wrought iron details.

Charles and Mabel Ennis commissioned Wright to design the house after retiring in 1923. New-building permits for both parts of the house were issued in May 1924, and the garage was finished that December, followed by the main house in August 1925. The Ennis family lived in the house only until 1936, after which it had seven owners in 44 years. One such owner, the actor John Nesbitt, bought the house in 1940 and had Wright add a swimming pool, billiard room, and heating system. After further changes of ownership, the house was acquired in 1968 by Augustus Brown, who renovated it further before donating it to the Trust for Preservation of Cultural Heritage (TPCH) in 1980. Over the next 25 years, the TPCH renovated the house, which was damaged during the 1994 Northridge earthquake and by heavy rains in 2005. The Ennis House Foundation managed and restored the house from 2005 to 2011, when it sold the house to the businessman Ronald Burkle, who made further repairs. Burkle sold the house in 2019 to the cannabis executives Robert Rosenheck and Cindy Capobianco for $18 million, at the time the highest price ever paid for a Wright-designed building.

== Site ==
The Ennis House is located in the Los Feliz neighborhood of Los Angeles in California, United States, with an address of 2607 or 2655 Glendower Avenue. The house's only means of access is via Glendower Avenue, a narrow road that winds through Los Feliz and surrounds the building on three sides. Designed by Frank Lloyd Wright, the house sits on a hill, which slopes down sharply toward the south. Wright's nearly-contemporary John Storer House and Samuel Freeman House were also built on hilltop sites; the writer Robert C. Twombly wrote that this made the houses look "seemingly impenetrable" from the street. A writer for Contemporary Literature magazine wrote in 1997 that the house signified Wright's ethos of "extreme individualism" and his distaste for urbanism, especially given its site. Frank Lloyd Wright Building Conservancy president John Payne said in 2003 that the house took advantage of its topography in a similar vein to Wright's earlier Prairie style work, which tended to be low to the ground.

The site covers approximately 5/6 acre (0.34 ha), measuring 248 feet (76 m) wide from west to east. The house consists of a main building and a garage wing, separated by an enclosed motor court, or courtyard for vehicles. A footbridge spans the motor court, connecting the main house's northern terrace with the garage wing. In addition, there is a koi pond and swimming pool in the rear of the main house, as well as terraces and other open spaces overlooking Los Angeles. The Ennis House overlooks Downtown Los Angeles and Griffith Park to the east, and it also faces the Pacific Ocean to the west. The house is one of several buildings in Los Feliz designed by Wright and his apprentices; other such structures include the Lovell House and John Sowden House. Prior to the development of Los Feliz, the site had been part of a Spanish-era land grant known as Rancho Los Feliz.

== Architecture ==
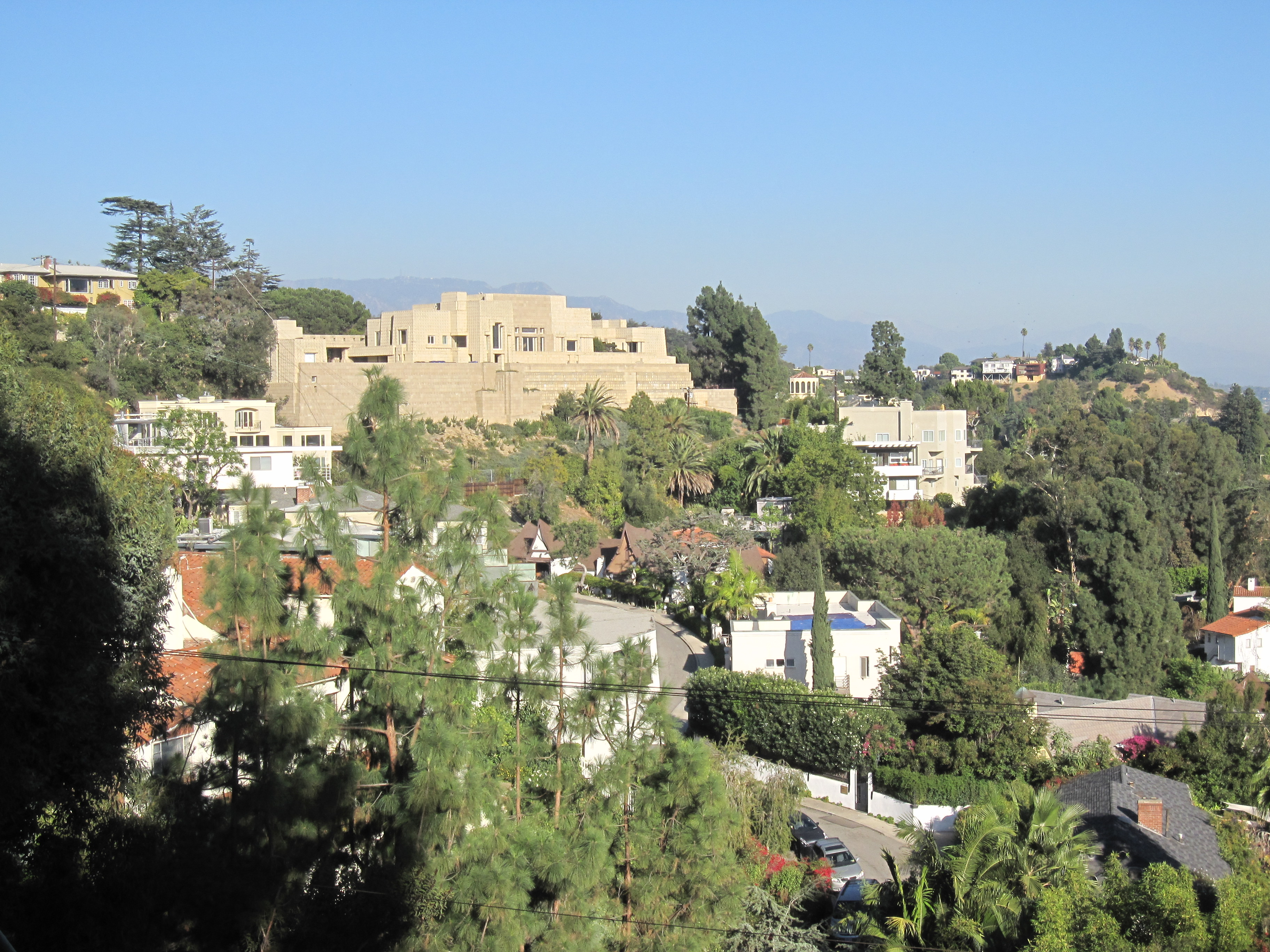
The house as seen from a nearby building

The Ennis House is one of eight buildings Wright designed in Greater Los Angeles, alongside houses like the Millard House (La Miniatura), the Hollyhock House, the Storer House, and the Freeman House. (Note: Besides these houses, Wright's three other works in Greater Los Angeles are the Anderton Court Building in Beverly Hills, the Sturges House in Brentwood, and the Arch Oboler House's gatehouse on Mulholland Drive.) The Ennis, Freeman, Millard, and Storer houses were the only four textile block houses he designed in Los Angeles; the Ennis House is the largest of Wright's four textile-block buildings in Los Angeles. According to the writer Hugh Hart, "Wright saw his Textile Block Method approach as an utterly modern, and democratic, expression of his organic architecture ideal." Few of his clients ended up commissioning textile-block designs, given the novelty of the construction method. As The New York Times later said: "Aside from the free-spirited oil heiress Aline Barnsdall, whom he fought with constantly, his motley clients included a jewelry salesman [Samuel Freeman], a rare-book dealing widow [Alice Millard] and a failed doctor [John Storer]." After designing the four textile-block houses, Wright went on to design various concrete-block buildings across the U.S., including Usonian houses made of "Usonian Automatic" blocks.

The Ennis House was built at a time when Wright was transitioning away from the Prairie-style designs of his early career and toward the Usonian designs of his later career. It is sometimes described as having a Mayan Revival design, inspired by the motifs of Puuc architecture in Uxmal. Jim Guichard, who helped train the house's docents in the 1980s, said the house's architectural style had been selected because Wright wanted "an architecture indigenous to America" and found the Mayan style to be suitable for the southwestern U.S. Wright wrote that he had been inspired by Native American and Mexican motifs, saying in 1957 that he had wished to visit Central America at some point. The house has also been described as a "Californian Romanza" structure since its design was influenced by numerous architectural styles, including those of Egypt, China, and Western Europe. The writer Merrill Schleier described the patterns in the house's design as having been influenced by Japanese or Moorish architecture. A 2001 Architectural Record article described the design as bearing Cubism or Corbusian elements while stating that Wright's influence was still evident.

=== Exterior ===
The main entrance is through a pair of gates for pedestrians and vehicles, which are decorated with Mayan motifs. The vehicular gate leads to the house's motor court, which is surrounded by a low wall. The motor court, in turn, connects to a detached carport or semi-open garage with space for two vehicles. A doorway leads from the motor court directly to the main house's loggia; the original plans called for an open-air loggia, but it was enclosed to give the house a direct entrance from the motor court. An outdoor swimming pool, dating from 1940, is located on a terrace abutting the house's northern facade. The pool is variously cited as measuring 20 by 40 feet (6.1 by 12.2 m) or 18 by 44 feet (5.5 by 13.4 m) across. The terrace abuts a bedroom and library inside. Both the main house and the garage wing have large windows and elaborate columns.

==== Walls ====
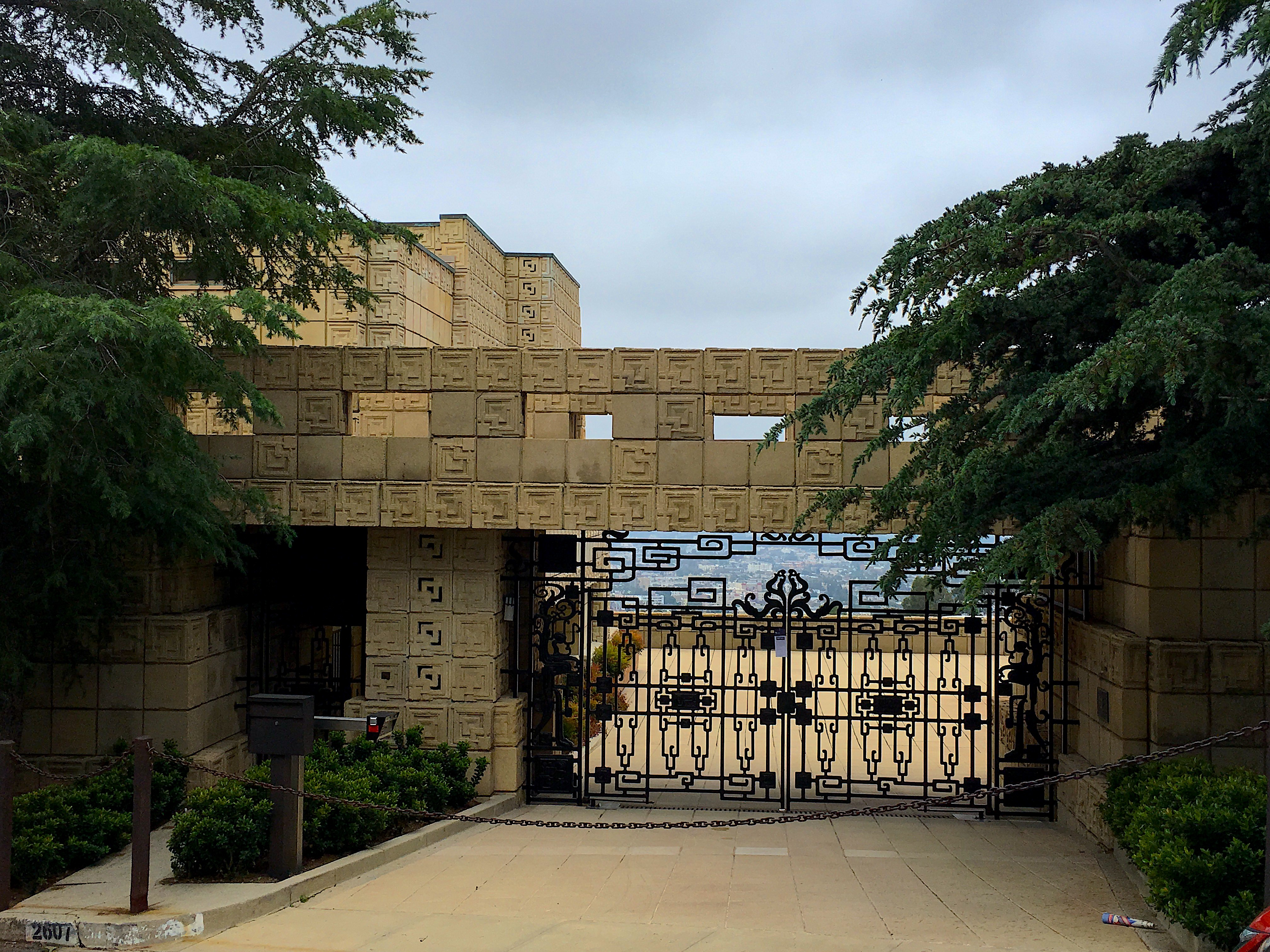
The house's main entrance gate, looking toward the motor court

Sources disagree on whether the house uses 24,000, 27,000, 40,000, or 45,000 concrete textile blocks. The blocks were made of degraded granite from the site itself, which was mixed with sand, gravel, and water and then poured into molds. The buff color of these blocks was derived by mixing these materials with dirt from the site. The concrete was reminiscent of the adobe used in Mayan temples, and Wright had also perceived the material as blending in with the Southwestern United States' topography and climate. Mortar joints are placed between the blocks, which are fastened to each other using loops of steel; the blocks also contain steel rods. The "textile block" name is derived from the fact that the rods are integrated with the blocks to give it a knitted-together appearance. Wright believed that the textile blocks would protect the house against earthquake damage—which turned out not to be the case during the 1994 Northridge earthquake—and that the concrete would provide fire protection and cool down the house. Wright's assistant Edgar Tafel also claimed that the blocks could be mass-produced, similar to factory-made items.

The typical block weighs 35 pounds (16 kg), with square faces measuring 16 by 16 inches (410 mm × 410 mm) across. Each block measures 3.5 inches (89 mm) thick. The blocks are decorated with patterns because, although Wright liked concrete for its malleability, he also thought that plain concrete was perceived as unattractive. There are engraved Greek key patterns that are variously characterized as vaguely resembling the lowercase letter "g" (a possible reference to the symbol of the Masonic Order, of which original owner Charles Ennis was a member) or local plants. In contrast to the Freeman House, where two mirror-image patterns were used, the Ennis House uses a single pattern, and the blocks are oriented in the same direction. The blocks were manufactured in 20 or 24 shapes; some are smaller than a standard block, while others had patterning on multiple faces or inset glass panels. The textile blocks absorbed moisture easily and were prone to decay because of impurities present when the blocks were cast.

The house's outer walls are made of two layers of concrete blocks, with an air gap between them, which are supported by footings at ground level. The blocks on the outer walls are offset, making them appear more battered, and the interior and exterior faces of the walls both contain engraved patterns. The outer walls contain setbacks as they ascend, giving the facade a massing similar to a Mayan temple. Surrounding the house are large retaining walls, also made of textile blocks. According to the writer Robert L. Sweeney, the retaining walls made the house appear larger than it actually was. The walls are structurally separate from the rest of the house and are reinforced by concrete beams measuring 12 by 12 inches (300 by 300 mm) across. Running perpendicularly to the retaining walls, and underneath the house, are crib walls, which are placed every 8 feet (2.4 m). The spaces between the crib walls and retaining walls are infilled with dirt and sand.

==== Windows and roof ====
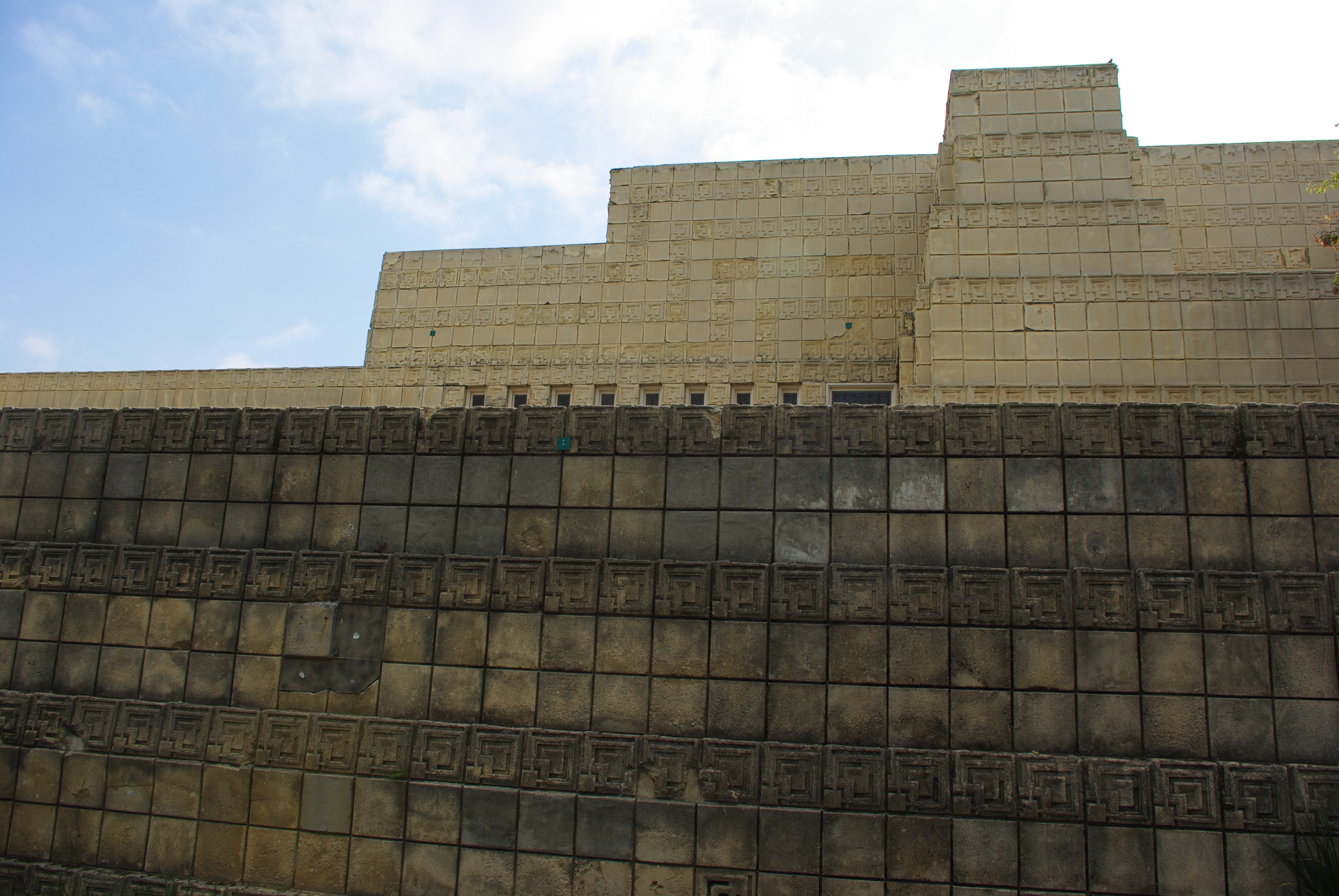
Detail of the house's roof

The facade contains gold, green, blue, and purple stained glass windows, which depict wisterias. These were the last stained-glass windows that Wright designed for a residential building during his lifetime, as he began using perforated wood blocks in his later houses. There are 32 stained-glass panels, divided into 29 stained-glass windows and three stained-glass doors. The final design of the windows contrasted with Wright's original plans, which called for a block-shaped pattern evocative of the facade. The window sills have large lintels, which shield the interiors from bright sunlight. The roof slabs are split across 14 levels; the shape of the roof is similar to that of the Hollyhock House in that some parts of the roof are flat, while others ascend in a ziggurat-like configuration. The roof includes telescoping towers, which become progressively smaller as they ascend.

=== Interior ===
The interior of the house is commonly cited as containing 6,000 square feet (560 m^{2}) or 6,200 square feet (580 m^{2}) of space. (Note: Some sources have cited figures as low as 4,720 square feet (439 m^{2}) or 5,500 square feet (510 m^{2}), and as high as 7,000 square feet (650 m^{2}) or 10,000 square feet (930 m^{2}).) The floor plan is arranged around a grid of squares measuring 4 feet (48 in; 120 cm) across; each square corresponds to three textile blocks. The house has three and a half bathrooms. As originally configured, the main house had a living and dining room, a kitchen, and three bedrooms, while the garage and servants' quarters were in a separate wing. In total, the main house has ten rooms, while three additional rooms are in the garage wing. (Note: Depending on whether the garage wing is counted, the house is variously cited as having four bedrooms (including the wing) or three bedrooms (excluding the wing).) Similarly to his other work, Wright designed the Ennis House with an open plan layout; the historian Scott Frank says the layout was intended to accommodate the "flow of life", while the National Park Service said the layout was meant for "comfortable, informal living". However, the house also differs from Wright's other work in that most of the rooms are placed on the second floor, not on the first or ground floor.

The interior walls are made of the same concrete textile blocks as the exterior. They are variously supported by continuous foundation walls or standalone footings, both made of poured concrete. Textile-block beams span the ceilings, and steel is placed within the building's joints for seismic reinforcement. Wright had wanted to design corbeled arches, which were changed to flat lintels at the Ennises' request. Additionally, whereas Wright designed built-in furniture for many of his other house designs, the Ennis family brought in their own furniture. Other decorations throughout the house include chandeliers, marble floors, mosaic tiles, and exposed ceiling beams, as well as fireplaces and wrought iron decorations. These decorations were commonplace in other homes of the time, though they were arranged in a way that Scott Frank described as "mechanical". Some of the decorations (such as the wrought iron, marble, and chandeliers) were not part of the original plans and were constructed by other designers; for example, Judson Studios made the stained glass, and Julius Dietzmann made the wrought iron. In contrast to the well-lit exteriors, many of the interior spaces are dimly lit, and sightlines are interrupted by various walls.

==== First floor ====
The house's main entrance leads to a darkened entrance hall beneath the main floor. The entrance hall opens up to a vestibule, which has a stone floor, patterned textile-block columns, and a ceiling no more than 7 feet (2.1 m) high. A staircase from the vestibule ascends to the second story; this stair is to the left of the entrance hall and is concealed behind a niche. At the top of the staircase is a grille with Maya motifs. At the same level as the entrance hall are a billiards room, powder room, and utility closet. The billiards room, which was added in 1940, occupies a space formerly used for storage.

==== Second floor ====
The second, or main, story includes the living–dining room (also known as the Great Room), library, kitchen, bedrooms, another bathroom, and servants' rooms. The Great Room has an oak floor, brass lamps, and a teakwood ceiling measuring at least 22 feet (6.7 m) high. (Note: Sources have also given figures of 26 ft (7.9 m) or 32 ft (9.8 m).) The dining area is located in the western part of the room, while the study and living area extend east of the dining space. The dining area is cruciform and protrudes from the main house. It is raised slightly above the rest of the Great Room, with a higher ceiling, and is accessed by a set of six steps. A low wall separates the living and dining spaces, and an archway separates the dining area from the stairs that lead to ground level. Stained-glass windows illuminate the Great Room and are embedded within several French doors.

The house's loggia measures 100 feet (30 m) long (Note: An alternative figure of 80 feet (24 m) is given in one source.) and connects all the rooms in the main house, extending east from the living–dining room to the main house's bedrooms and the northern facade's terrace. Within the loggia is a 14-foot-tall (4.3 m) door leading to a closet, as well as full-height windows and rectangular columns. The loggia is divided into bays by twenty pairs of textile-block columns, which run parallel to each other for the length of the loggia. Also inside the loggia is a fireplace facing the dining area, which has a bronze hood or grille with Maya motifs. Above the fireplace is a gilded glass-tile mosaic depicting wisterias, which was created by Orlando Giannini and is the only remaining mosaic of four that were constructed for Wright-designed houses. The fireplace spans three bays, which are higher than the rest of the loggia; the upper sections of these bays have square clerestory windows.

Charles Ennis's bedroom (also known as the master bedroom) is at the far eastern end of the house, while Mabel Ennis's bedroom is smaller and is adjacent to the living room. On the opposite side of the Great Room, wedged between the dining area and a pantry adjoining the kitchen, is a guest bedroom. The guest room and the kitchen are on the same level as the dining area, above the rest of the second floor. There is also a separate bedroom in the garage wing. The bathrooms throughout have marble floors and ceramic-tile bathtubs. The tubs, likely inspired by those that Wright saw on his visits to Japan, are recessed into the ground. Wright's original plans had called for the joints in the floors, ceilings, and walls to be covered with gold mosaic tiles. During construction, the plans were modified so that the entirety of the walls and floors were covered in white tile, while the ceiling was plastered.

== History ==
The Ennis House was one of multiple high-profile projects that Wright completed in the 1920s, along with his other Los Angeles houses and Tokyo's Imperial Hotel. Wright had received the commissions for the Ennis, Freeman, and Storer houses nearly simultaneously, shortly after he had completed La Miniatura. The order in which the three houses were constructed is disputed. (Note: The order is unclear because the Freeman House was completed before the entire Ennis House was ready, but after part of the Ennis House had been opened. The Freeman House was completed in March 1925. The Ennis House's garage was finished in December 1924, but the main part of the Ennis House was not done until August 1925.) Wright's grandson Eric Lloyd Wright and Los Angeles Times reporter Charles Lockwood stated that the Ennis House was built after the Storer House and before the Freeman House, while other sources described the Ennis House as having been built last. Prior to constructing the textile-block houses, Wright had used pre-Columbian motifs in other structures such as Chicago's Midway Gardens and Richland Center, Wisconsin's German Warehouse.

=== Development ===
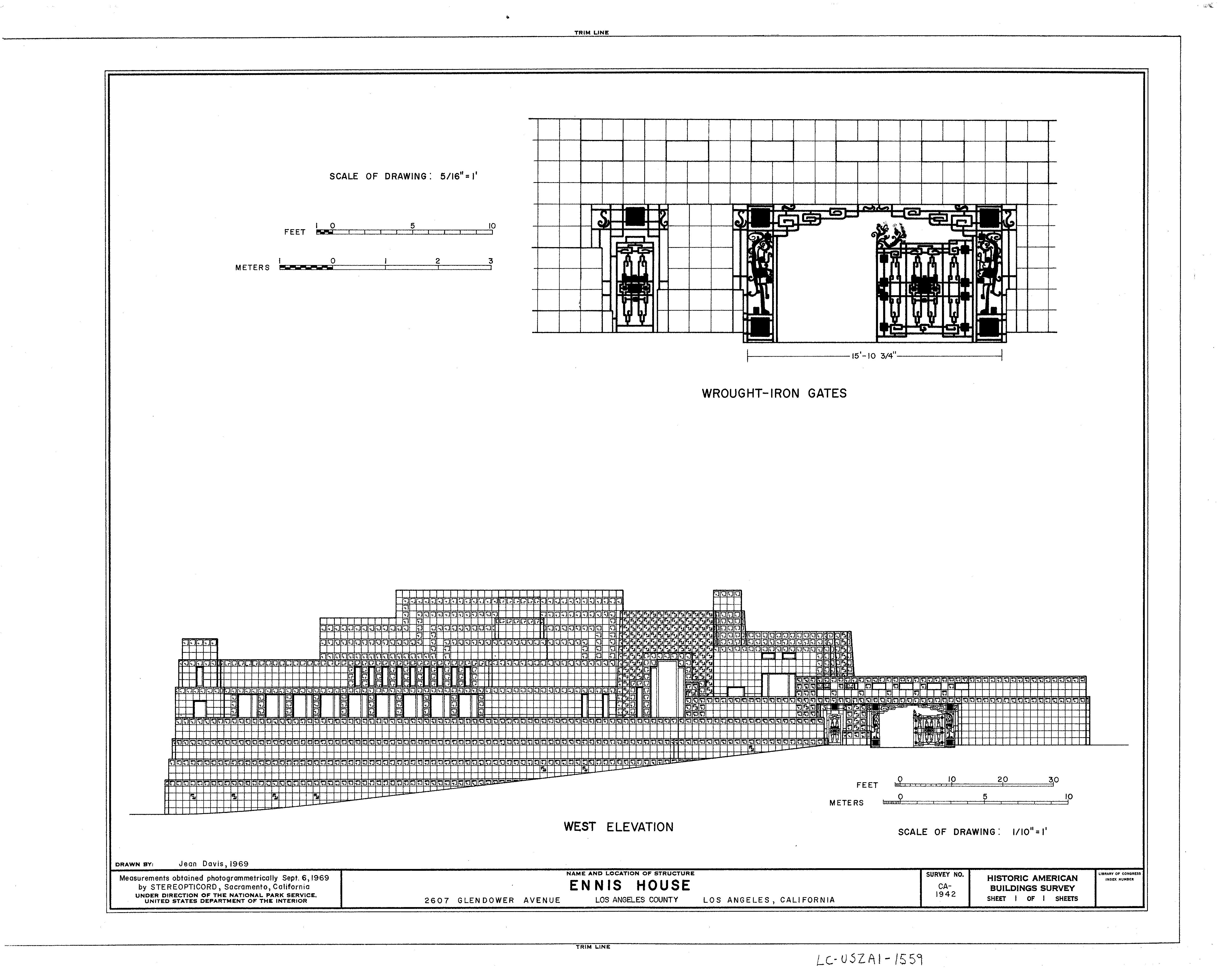
Drawing of the northern elevation

Little is known about the original owners, Charles and Mabel Ennis. Though some sources cite them as having operated a men's clothing store, they are also quoted as having been in the oil or iron industries. Charles and Mabel both came from the Midwest and were born in 1858 and 1863, respectively; after several years in Indianapolis and Pittsburgh, they had moved to Los Angeles by 1901, living in two modest houses before constructing their Los Feliz house. After retiring from their firm c. 1923, they bought two adjacent lots on Glendower Avenue. The Ennises commissioned Wright to design the house in the Mayan style, an architectural style they liked. Wright, who had used the textile-block system in his previous work, decided to experiment further with these blocks; for example, he offset the blocks and incorporated them into overhead ceiling beams. As he told the Ennises, "The final result is going to stand on that hill a hundred years or more", predicting that it would attract tourists from all over. The Ennis family received the blueprints on February 24, 1924, and quickly hired workers to clear the land. They also hired Frank's son, Lloyd Wright, as the construction supervisor.

Two new-building permits, one each for the house and its garage, were issued on May 1, 1924. As with Wright's other Los Angeles houses, he was assisted by his son and by his apprentice Rudolph Schindler. The construction of the concrete textile blocks is detailed in a report that the Ennises commissioned from an engineering firm shortly after construction started. To create the blocks, workers mixed granite, sand, and gravel, and the resulting aggregate was then blended with Portland cement at a 4:1 ratio. The mixture was then blended with water and stirred until the mixture could stand up on its own. This material was then cast into aluminum molds, and the blocks were removed from the molds and kept moist for weeks. The garage wing was the first part of the house to be completed, followed by the main building. Workers built Charles Ennis's bedroom first and then proceeded westward toward the garage. In August 1924, Lloyd telegraphed his father to let him know that construction was being completed rapidly. Despite Lloyd's assurances, Wright felt that the project was proceeding slower than anticipated, blaming interference from the city government. The Ennis family was wealthy enough that they were able to weather the various delays in the building's construction.

Issues arose that September, when Lloyd telegraphed his father about the presence of cracks in the retaining wall, a concern the elder Wright dismissed. The garage wing was completed in December 1924, and Lloyd resigned that month after disagreements with the Ennises, who wanted to make changes to the design. (Note: Some sources write that it was the elder Wright who had severed his involvement with the project. However, Sweeney 1994 specifically cites a telegram from Lloyd Wright in which he had tendered his resignation.) Particular points of contention included the design of the house's lintels, bathtubs, and windows. The Ennises had also directed workers to make the base taller; modify the entrance; add chandeliers, marble floors, and wrought iron decorations; and remove or modify interior partitions. Though some sources claim that Wright designed furniture for the house that was never completed, Sweeney wrote that there was no indication that Wright had ever designed any furniture for the house. Third-party contractors ended up completing the house, which ultimately cost $300,000 to develop. Wright blamed delays in the construction of the Ennis House and his other textile-block houses for increasing his already considerable debt. The main house was substantially finished by August 1925, but work on interior design details continued for another year.

=== Private ownership ===
==== 1920s to 1940s ====
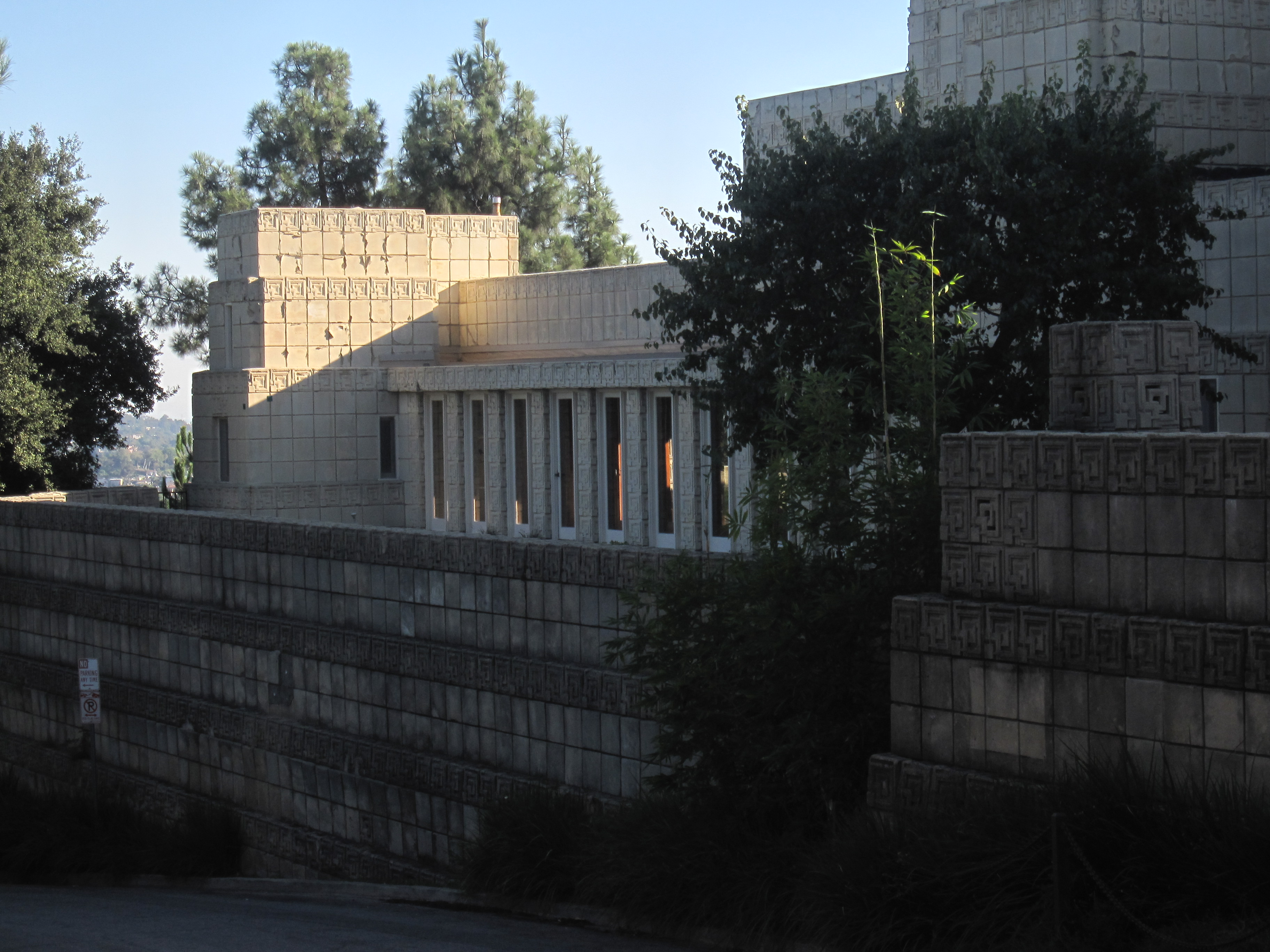
The loggia on the house's northern facade

Even before its completion, the house had shown signs of poor workmanship; for example, the blocks began falling apart before the Ennis family moved in. One critic wrote that the building looked like "a ruin under excavation" when it was being completed. Charles Ennis did not live in the house for long; sources disagree on whether he died in 1926 or 1928. Mabel Ennis sold the house in 1936 after living there for another decade. After Mabel sold the house, it had seven private owners between 1936 and 1980.

Among the Ennis House's most notable owners was the actor John Nesbitt, who bought the Ennis House in April 1940, reportedly paying $20,000. Shortly afterward, Nesbitt wrote to Wright requesting copies of the house's blueprints, saying that the house's south retaining wall was bulging outward. Wright readily agreed, saying that the house needed much work and insulting the Ennises as "ignorant clients". Meanwhile, Nesbitt tried to modify the house himself, adding a swimming pool and removing some of the Ennises' modifications (such as the light fixtures and marble floors), under the supervision of Wright's son Lloyd. Nesbitt had initially been enamored with Wright, asking the architect to design another house for him in Carmel-by-the-Sea, California.

After a year of trying to renovate the house, Nesbitt approached Wright in 1941 to complete the renovation for $3,500. Wright's drawings for the expansion referred to the building as Sijistan, in honor of a palace in Persia. The modifications included converting a storage room into a billiard room and installing a heating system, as well as the construction of an additional bedroom. False ceilings were added to the second-floor rooms, while the first floor remained mostly unchanged except for new furniture. Relations between Nesbitt and Wright deteriorated in late 1941 after Wright accused Nesbitt of failing to pay him for his Carmel design. Nesbitt ultimately sold the Ennis House in 1942. The house's south retaining wall continued to bulge outward, and the house was resold several more times in the subsequent years.

==== 1950s to 1970s ====
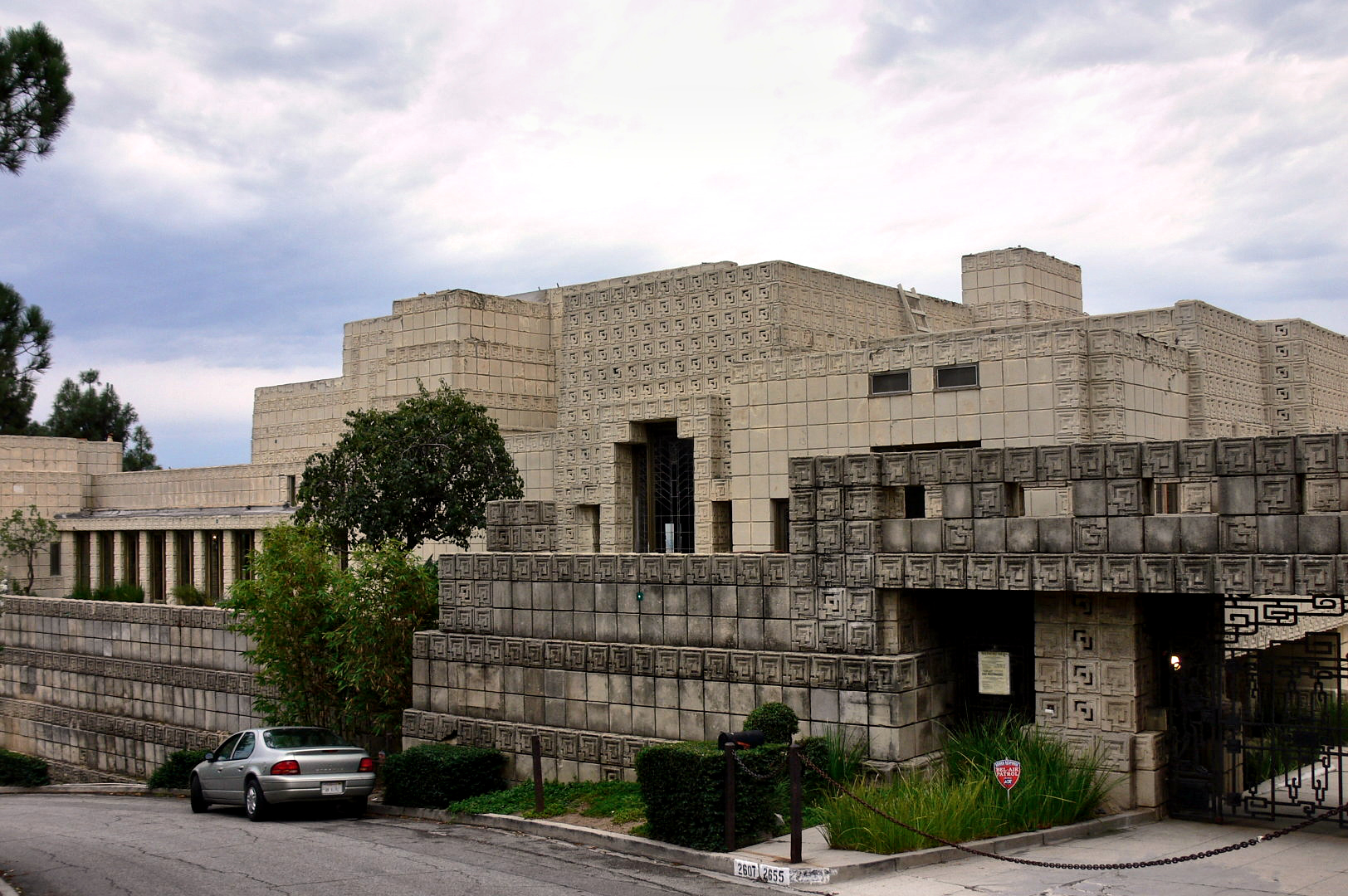
The house seen from the street

Lyle Corcoran, who became the house's seventh owner in 1956, later said that Wright's work has "got substance", unlike newer, flimsier wood-frame houses. By the late 1950s, the house was being neglected, and the owner at the time, unable or unwilling to repair the house, had attempted to sell it without success. The difficulty of selling the house was exacerbated after it appeared in the 1959 film House on Haunted Hill, which prompted young fans of the film to visit the house at night and scream as loudly as they could. A reporter for the Los Angeles Times, writing in 1965, said that the house's front gates were padlocked and that the walls were graffitied, surmising that "the owners have not been treated well by passersby". The house also gained a reputation as a haunted house. Corcoran placed the house for sale in 1968 with an asking price of $175,000. Augustus "Gus" Oliver Brown, a healthcare administrator who later owned the house, claimed that Corcoran had lived in only one room of the house because it was crumbling, and that Corcoran would chase away local youth with his shotgun.

In 1968, Brown bought the Ennis House for $119,000, becoming its eighth owner. The house was being marketed for $125,000, whereas a real estate expert estimated that the house had been valued at $300,000. None of the original decorations remained. Brown later recalled that the facade and plasterwork were crumbling; the house lacked hot water; and the electricity in some rooms did not work. Brown's daughter Janet Tani called the house "highly livable" despite its size, and said of the land: "By walking a few feet, one can be in a completely different environment." Tani later said that it attracted visitors like the photographer Edmund Teske, who were often astonished at the architecture. Shortly after Brown moved in, he experienced the same issues as Corcoran had, with local youth swarming the house and trying to scale the walls at night. This prompted Brown to print out hundreds of one-page leaflets about the house, which helped keep away youth but attracted architecture fans.

During his ownership of the house, Brown replaced deteriorated decorations, refurbished the mechanical systems, added waterproofing and a sprinkler system, and removed a bathroom and bedroom. He added a Japanese garden on the site of the former bathroom and bedroom. The facade had decayed extensively due to moisture problems aggravated by defects in the original construction. The textile blocks had included traces of clay and feldspar, which tended to decay or deform when moist, and the moisture had corroded away the steel rebar inside the blocks and created cracks within the concrete. This issue was exacerbated when one of the previous owners applied a sealant, which was intended to prevent further water intrusion but instead trapped the moisture inside. Brown ultimately spent more than $200,000 of his own money on renovations. After his wife died and his daughters moved away, it became increasingly hard for him to raise money to maintain the Ennis House.

=== Foundation ownership ===
Brown donated the Ennis House in 1980 to the Trust for Preservation of Cultural Heritage (TPCH), a non-profit organization that he created to receive a tax exemption for the house. In exchange, Brown was allowed to continue living there. Although the TPCH took over day-to-day operations, Brown remained involved as the TPCH's executive director, opening the house to the public six times a year. His daughter Janet was also involved as an associate curator and was given the right to live in the house after her father died. The TPCH, which had a board of 14 directors, referred to the edifice as the Ennis–Brown House in honor of his donation.

==== 1980s to early 1990s ====
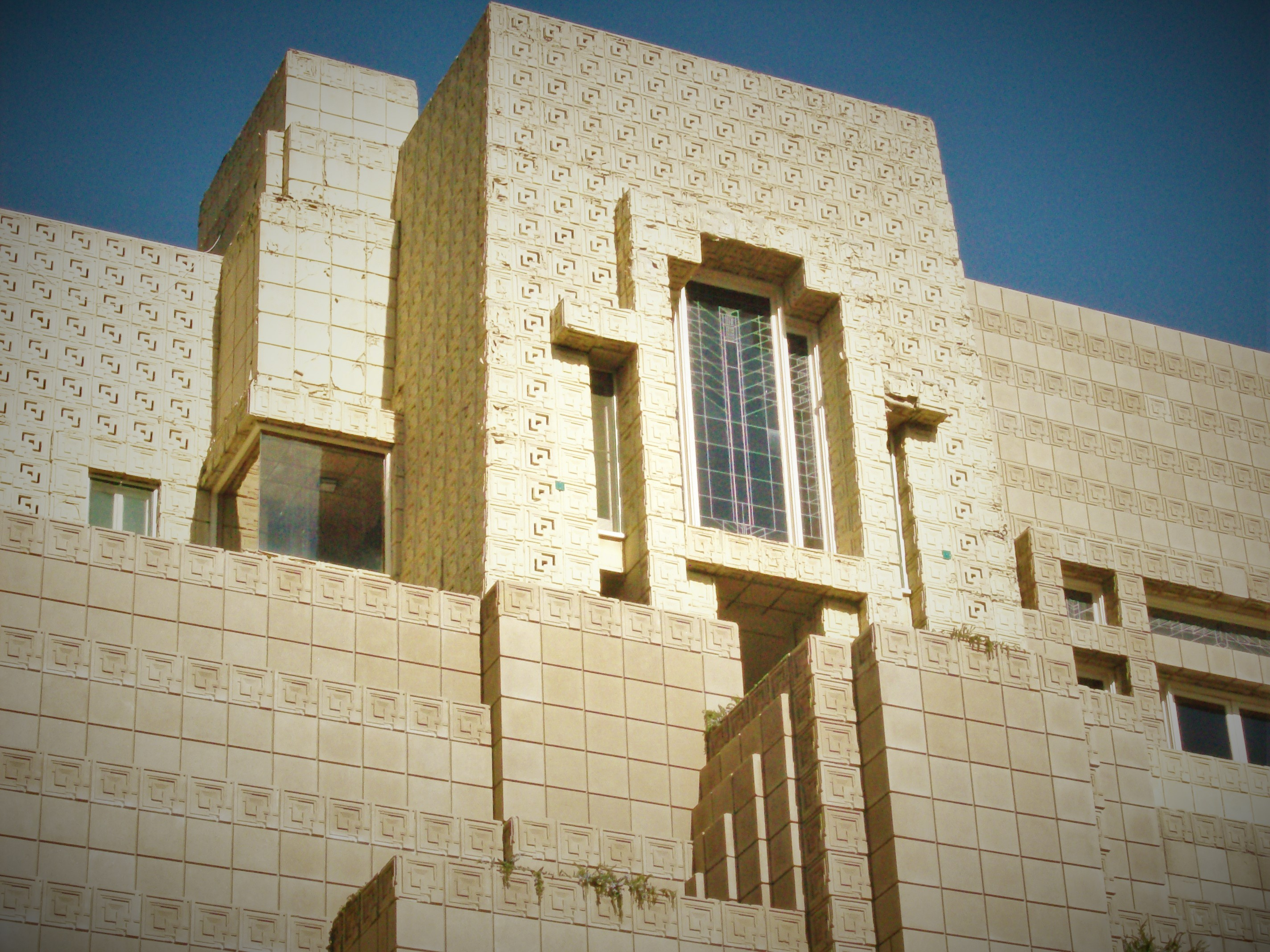
Detail of the house as viewed from downhill

Brown first invited the public into the Ennis House in March 1980, and he began raising $250,000 to restore the house. He received $38,000 from the federal government and announced that he would sell some of the plain concrete blocks to raise further money. Revenue from public tours was used to help fund the renovation as well. In 1981, one of the bedrooms was decorated with fiberglass tiles during the filming of the movie Blade Runner. Within two years, the TPCH sought to replace about 2,100 of the concrete textile blocks in the retaining wall, which had started to bulge outward. Eric Lloyd Wright, Frank's grandson, helped restore the house during this decade. Some of the rooms were also rented out to three of Brown's insurance businesses, and four of his employees worked there.

By 1985, the renovation cost was estimated at $500,000, while annual maintenance costs were estimated at $100,000. Neither the state nor federal governments would pay for the retaining wall's repairs, prompting the TPCH to host parties and tours to raise money. Because the house was not zoned for commercial use, the city's Board of Zoning Appeals ruled in late 1985 that the house could not hold parties or tours, and that Brown's businesses could continue using the house only if he were the sole employee of each business. The next year, the TPCH asked the city government for permission to host fundraisers at the house, though the trust later withdrew this request in favor of hosting small parties, which did not require permission. To alleviate local residents' concerns, Brown agreed to implement rules that restricted attendance, parking, and noise levels during events at the house. After the Getty Foundation announced in 1988 that it would give up to $320,000 per building for restoration projects in Los Angeles, the TPCH applied for a Getty grant. The TPCH's board was considering selling some of the house's furniture by 1989 to raise money for the renovations, after various other attempts to raise money for repairs had failed. At the time, the house needed at least $1 million to replace its roof, retaining wall, and courtyard.

Despite the lack of parking in the neighborhood, the Ennis House continued to host weddings and film shoots. The house earned about $120,000 a year from film shoots and $100,000 from other events by the late 1980s. By then, Brown had a strained relationship with the TPCH's board, which wanted him to resign as the trust's director amid an ongoing dispute over the use of funds that had been raised for the house. The dispute had triggered the resignations of six TPCH board members in three years. There were also complaints that the house was being neglected (even though the TPCH had raised $500,000 for the roof) and that loud parties were being hosted there. In response to claims that the house was continuing to host as many as 30 annual events, the Los Angeles Board of Public Works voted in 1989 to ban parties or other public events at the house. Neighbors also requested that the Board of Public Works restrict film shoots around the house, and the board voted in May 1991 to severely restrict film permits. Under the restrictions, no more than seven or nine film permits could be issued for the house each year.

==== Late 1990s and early 2000s ====
By the 1990s, amid increased interest in Wright's work among the general public, the house was open to the public one Sunday every two months. In addition, the TPCH launched an architectural design competition for the house's furniture, which Wright had designed but never built; the competition attracted 100 architects. Ultimately, John Michael of Pennsylvania received the commission to build the furniture.

The house was damaged during the 1994 Northridge earthquake, which created holes in the house's southern retaining wall. Brown began seeking $3 million to repair the house, which included fixing water damage. To pay for part of this cost, Brown allowed a New Jersey diner to reproduce the house's tiles, host fundraisers, and sell replicas of the tiles. In 1999, the Federal Emergency Management Agency (FEMA) agreed to give the TPCH either $2.5 million or $3.1 million in matching funds, but the trust could raise only $1 million. The California Office of Historic Preservation also gave the TPCH a $350,000 matching grant, while the Getty Foundation gave the house a $100,000 grant to finance temporary supports for the retaining wall.

By the late 1990s, objections to the house's use as a filming location had mostly abated, though film crews could only park a small number of vehicles next to the house. The firm Unreel Locations rented out the house to filmmakers; as an indication of the house's popularity as a filming location, no-parking signs on Glendower Avenue specifically exempted film crews from the ban. The house also hosted public tours three days a week, with approximately 3,000 annual visitors. This made it one of two Wright-designed buildings in Los Angeles that were open to the public, the other being Hollyhock House. A full renovation of the building had been postponed due to funding uncertainties. Due to continuing deterioration, in 2003, the World Monuments Fund added the Ennis House to its 2004 list of the world's most endangered sites. The TPCH had raised less than one-third of the house's estimated $10 million renovation cost; to raise funds, the TPCH began allowing people to sponsor individual textile blocks. The Ennis House was closed for renovations in December 2004; this project was partly funded by $2.5 million from the federal government. Eric Lloyd Wright was again hired to design the renovation.

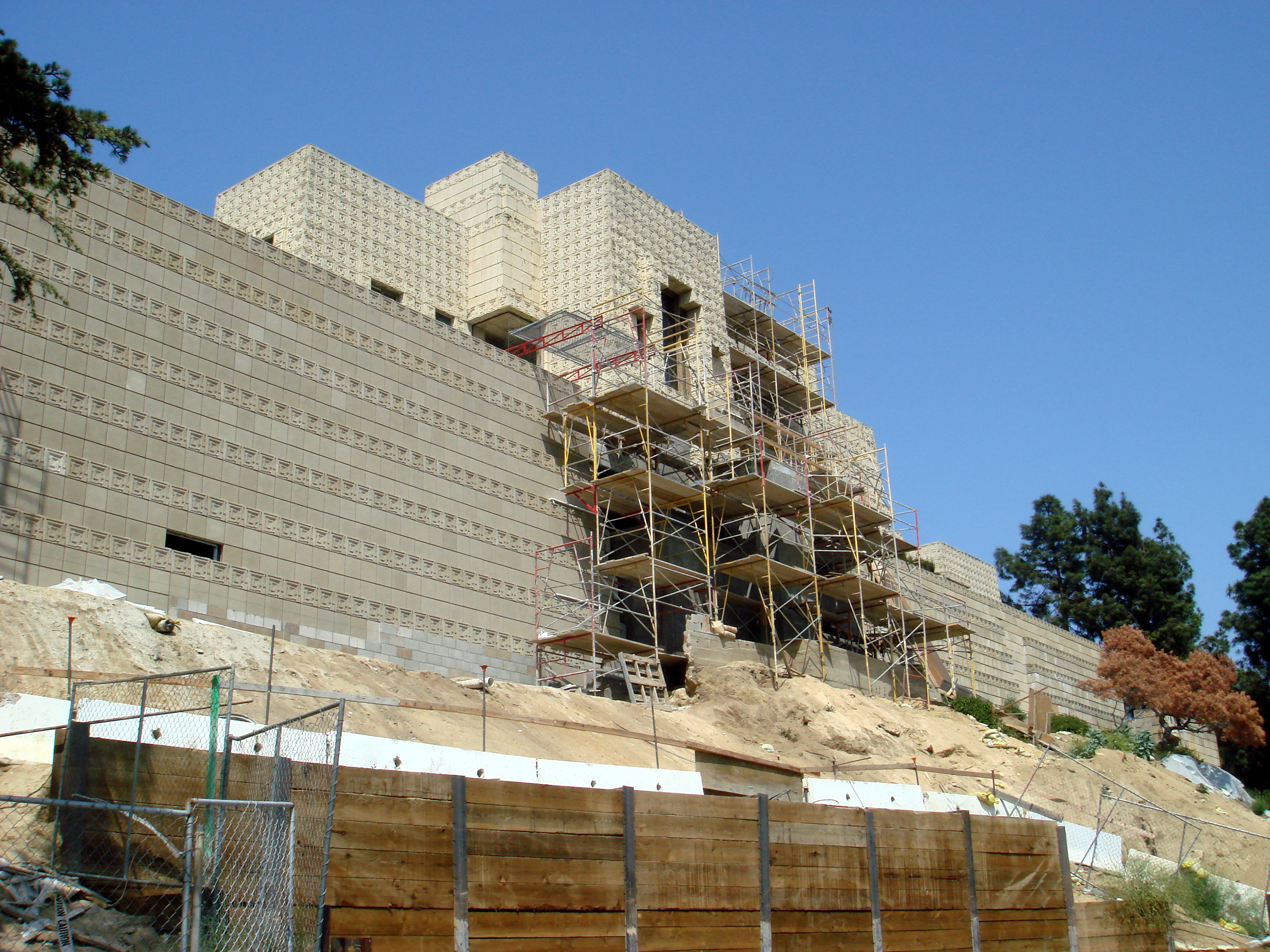
During restoration, May 2007

An unusually high amount of precipitation during the 2004–2005 season caused mudslides under the Ennis House in early 2005, causing about $500,000 in damage. The mudslides dislodged part of the retaining wall under the house, prompting Los Angeles city inspectors to temporarily red-tag the house in March 2005, which completely banned anyone from entering. The red-tag restriction on the main building was shortly downgraded to a yellow tag, allowing people to enter during the day, but other parts of the house remained off-limits at all times. There were proposals to install canopies to protect the house from further damage, but the TPCH rejected these suggestions. In part due to the damage, the Ennis House was added to the National Trust for Historic Preservation's list of the 11 Most Endangered Historic Places for 2005. The Financial Times wrote at the time that "Wright's 1924 exercise in domestic monumentalism has not aged well". Joel Silver, a film producer who had restored both the Storer House and the Wright-designed Auldbrass Plantation in South Carolina, agreed to ask his friends to help restore the house if the TPCH renamed the building the Ennis House and reorganized its board.

==== Ennis House Foundation takeover ====
The TPCH was dissolved in July 2005. The next month, the National Trust for Historic Preservation, Los Angeles Conservancy, and Frank Lloyd Wright Building Conservancy jointly formed the Ennis House Foundation to raise money for the house's renovation. The foundation's creation followed advocacy from the actress Diane Keaton, who, along with Eric Lloyd Wright, was named to the foundation's board of directors. At the time, the cost of stabilizing the house was estimated at $5 million, and the renovation was estimated to cost $12–15 million. In the two years after the Ennis House Foundation was reformed, Keaton and Eric raised about $6 million to restore the house. In 2006, the project received a FEMA grant, as well as a $4.5 million construction loan through First Republic Bank. The bank loan was guaranteed by the businessman Ron Burkle, who had been personally interested in the house since childhood. Eric drew up plans to fix the retaining wall.

The project included a new structural support system, restoration or replacement of damaged blocks, restoration of windows, and a new roof. The motor court was rebuilt, and various smaller architectural elements, such as the fireplaces, were restored. Much of the house had been restored by 2007, at which point the Ennis House Foundation had spent $6.5 million on the renovations. Further restoration was halted due to the foundation lacking funding, and the government and other nonprofit organizations also being unable to provide sufficient money. It was increasingly difficult for the foundation to maintain the house due to the high cost of doing so, and a consultant had recommended selling the house because few people were willing to donate. Furthermore, the foundation could not host fundraisers or other public events at the house due to neighborhood opposition. At the time, it was expected that another $5–7 million would be needed to complete the renovation. The Los Angeles Conservancy gave the renovation a preservation award in 2008.

In 2009, the Ennis House Foundation offered the house for sale with an asking price of $15 million; this amount would be used to pay off the Ennis House Foundation's debt. The foundation wanted to sell the house to an individual and had rejected several bids from an unspecified number of firms. The foundation had difficulties identifying a singular buyer, despite marketing the residence through the auction house Christie's, and the asking price was reduced to $10.495 million in February 2010. The Spanish newspaper El Mundo wrote that the house's landmark designations, which severely restricted any modifications to the house, may have deterred potential buyers. By later that year, the listing price had been reduced again to $7.495 million, less than half the original asking price, and there were discussions about possibly disassembling the house and shipping it to Japan. The Ennis House's real estate agent said that, despite the lack of bids, the house had attracted interest from foreign nationals.

=== Burkle ownership and resale ===
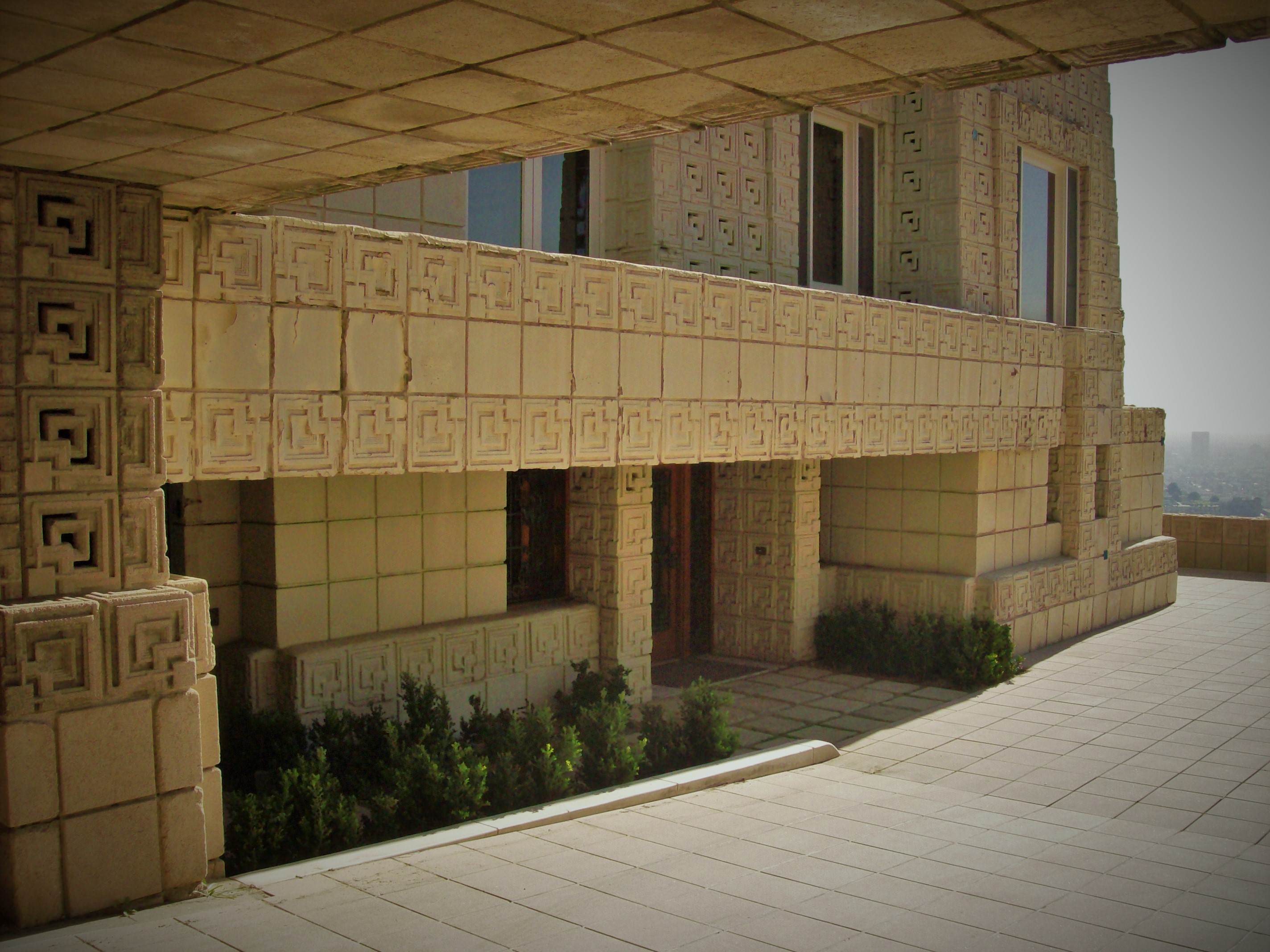
View of the main house from under the footbridge connecting the main house and garage wing, looking south toward Downtown Los Angeles

The Ennis House was sold to Burkle for just under $4.5 million in July 2011. The Ennis House Foundation obtained an easement on the house, which required Burkle and all subsequent buyers to allow public viewing for at least 12 days per year. Burkle appointed his longtime aide Tim Gleason to manage the house; he did not live in the Ennis House, but he did give tours and host events there. In addition, Burkle hired Eric Lloyd Wright to design a renovation of the house, and he claimed to have spent $13 million or $17 million on the project. The restoration price included the $6.4 million cost of the FEMA grant and matching funds, as well as the existing $4.5 million loan. About 3,000 or 4,000 of the concrete blocks were replaced. In addition, the electrical switches and lamps were replaced with replicas, and Burkle created replicas of the original furniture.

Burkle listed the building for sale at $23 million in June 2018, saying that he wanted to focus on conserving other structures. He sold the house for $18 million in October 2019. At the time, it was the highest sale price ever recorded for a Wright-designed house. (Note: It was beaten by the Clinton Walker House, which sold for $22 million in 2022.) The buyer was later identified as a limited liability company representing Robert Rosenheck and Cindy Capobianco, cannabis industry executives who were married to each other. After the sale, the Ennis House remained subject to a public-access easement.

== Media appearances ==
The Ennis House has appeared in a large number of media works. The house had appeared in more than 60 works of media by the late 1990s, though a New York Times article stated that this figure only included media appearances since 1968. An Architectural Digest article from 2022 estimated that the house had made over 80 media appearances. One of the most prominent films to feature the Ennis House was the 1982 film Blade Runner, the popularity of which led the Ennis House to be nicknamed the "Blade Runner house". The New York Times called the Ennis House "perhaps the most cinematic of Frank Lloyd Wright's buildings", and Diane Keaton said that the Ennis House "boasts more films to its credit than most actors have the privilege to make".

=== Use as a setting or filming location ===
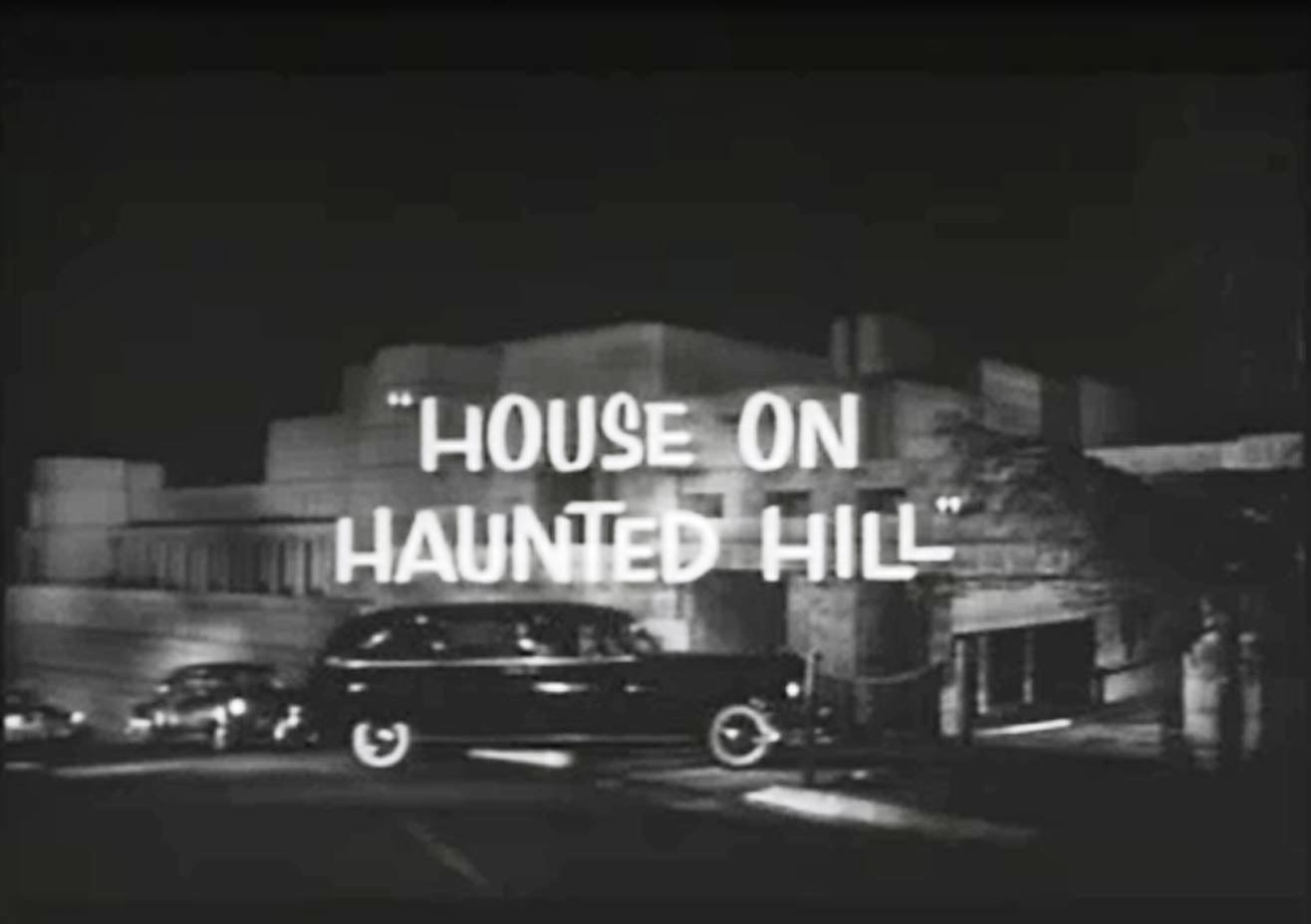
House on Haunted Hill (1959) was filmed at the Ennis House.

The first movie to use the Ennis House as a filming location was Female, which was released in 1933 and depicted the house as an automotive executive's residence. Over the years, the house has been depicted in a wide variety of contexts. For example, films have portrayed the building as an apartment, science lab, psychiatric clinic, haunted house, or mansion, and it has been depicted in such diverse genres as futuristic, film noir, and Japanese films. In addition to films and TV shows, the building has been depicted in commercials, photo shoots, and music videos. The house has had to be modified for many of these film shoots. For example, a pool was built at the house during the filming of Female (years before the house's actual swimming pool was built), and a matte backdrop depicting a high-rise building was added to the house for the 1989 film Black Rain.

Various explanations have been given for the Ennis House's popularity as a filming location; its proximity to Hollywood is cited as one reason. The need to raise money for the house's restoration, as well as the unusual design, are also cited as reasons that the Ennis House might have attracted filmmakers. A representative of Unreel Locations said in 2003 that the house was in high demand because, for filmmakers, it "can be a bit of a chameleon". Scott Frank wrote that the house's grandiose design made it ideal for films set in mansions; that its "austere beauty" was attractive to photographers; and that its unusual design enticed sci-fi film producers. The architect Michael Wyetzner cited the house's ancient-looking facade, hilltop location, and the roof's shape as creating the ideal conditions for a horror-movie set, while the reporter Edwin Heathcote wrote that the exterior was "the diametric opposite of the pure white houses of traditional futurology". In addition, Robert Sweeney regarded the house as evocative of a "pagan ritual".

According to Schleier, it is never depicted as a calm setting or a residence of a "normative nuclear family"; instead, the house is frequently depicted in films that require exotic settings. The house has predominantly been used as a setting for dystopian films and for those involving villainy or crime. As described by the filmmaker Thom Andersen, "Its most frequent role is the mansion of some gangster chieftain." Notable movies that have used the house as a setting or filming location include:

Notable film appearances
Year	Name	Notes
1933	Female	
1959	House on Haunted Hill	
1974	The Terminal Man	
1975	The Day of the Locust	
1982	Blade Runner	
1985	Howling II: Your Sister Is a Werewolf	
1987	Timestalkers	
1989	The Karate Kid Part III	
1989	Black Rain	
1991	The Rocketeer	
1991	Grand Canyon	
1991	Cold Heaven	
1994	A Passion to Kill	
1997	Snide and Prejudice	
1998	The Replacement Killers	
1998	Rush Hour	
1999	The Thirteenth Floor	
2000	Nurse Betty	
2001	Mulholland Drive	

TV shows have also used the house as a filming location, including Twin Peaks and Buffy the Vampire Slayer, and the Ennis House is also depicted in animated TV shows such as South Park. The house has been featured in commercials for companies such as Calvin Klein, Chanel, and Renault, as well as publicity stills for firms such as IBM and photo shoots for magazines such as Playboy. In addition, it has been a setting for other media, such as music videos and fashion shoots. Other films and TV shows have also copied the house's design in their sets, including episodes of the TV series The Studio. In 2025, the Frank Lloyd Wright Foundation signed a licensing agreement with the house's owners, Rob Rosenheck and Cindy Capobianco, allowing them to make documentaries about the Ennis House and the other Wright houses in Greater Los Angeles.

=== Media about the house ===
The Ennis House has also been the subject of media in its own right, being featured in several documentaries. For instance, the Ennis House was one of several architectural landmarks detailed in the documentary Los Angeles Plays Itself, and the Ennis House and Wright's other houses in Los Angeles were also detailed in the 2018 documentary That Far Corner. The house has been depicted in exhibitions, such as a 1988 exhibit on Wright's textile-block houses at Barnsdall Art Park and a 2005 photography exhibit in the Getty Center. An animated tour of the Ennis House was also released on CD-ROM in 1995, and the house has been shown in other media, such as a 2002 pop-up book about Wright's work.

== Impact and legacy ==
=== Reception ===
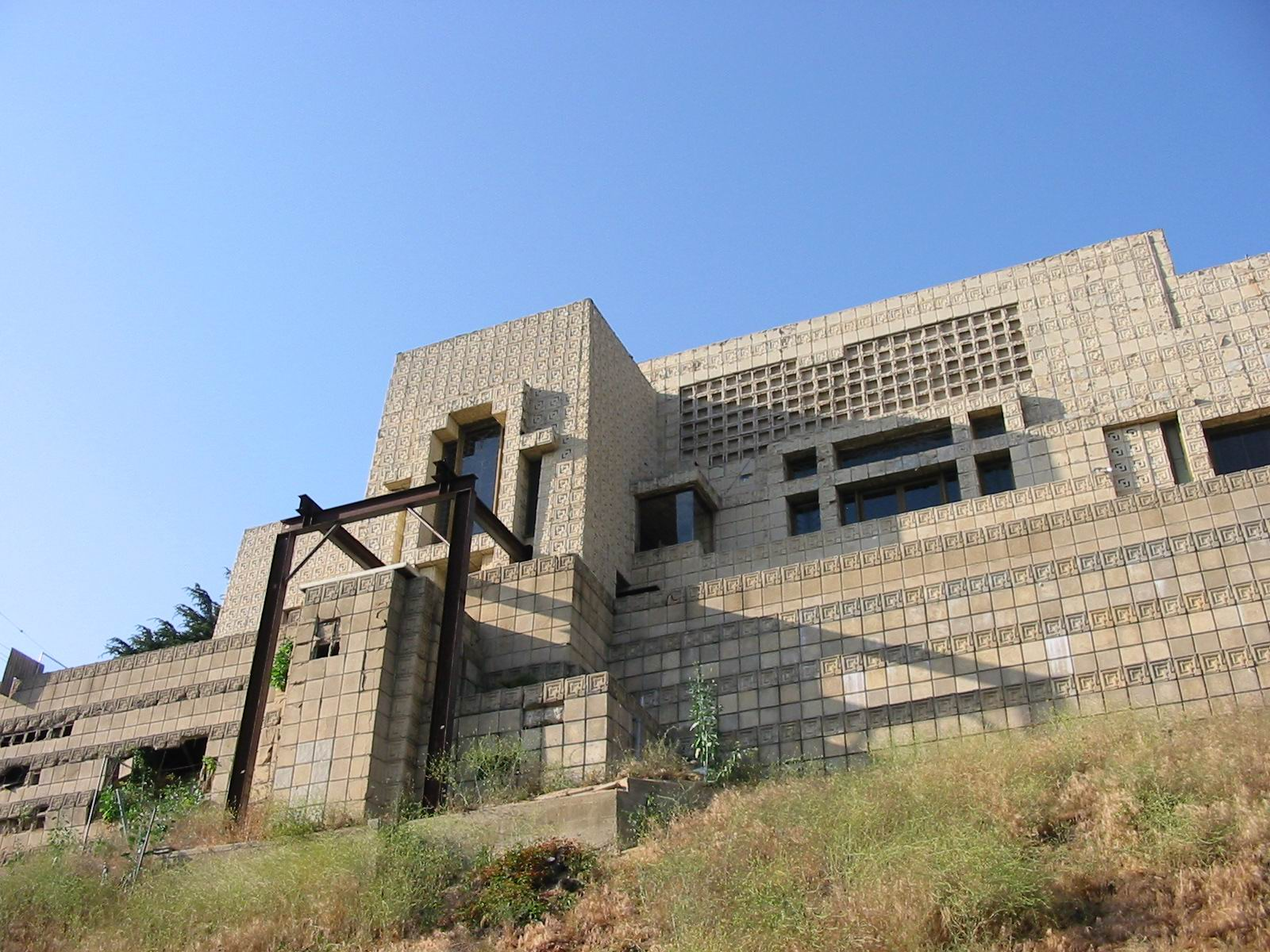
Another view of the house from downhill

After the Ennis House was completed, Wright reflected that he thought it "was out of bounds for a concrete block house" because of its large size, while the historian Henry-Russell Hitchcock described the house as "rather undomestic". John Pastier of the Los Angeles Times wrote in 1974 that the Ennis House and Wright's other textile-block designs in Los Angeles "successfully demonstrate Wright's special powers of expression and innovation". Alice van Buren of Artforum regarded the house negatively, describing it as having "decorative details asserting the freedom of the architect but leaving the viewer feeling like a prisoner". During the 1980s, Paul Goldberger regarded the Ennis House as "the grandest" of Wright's Los Angeles textile-block houses, though he thought the Storer House was the most appealing of the group. Charles Lockwood called the house a "striking example of Wright's genius for architectural drama", and Sam Hall Kaplan echoed the sentiment, describing it as "exuding a timelessness and an originality that marked Wright's genius".

In the 1990s, the Birmingham Post wrote that the house was "not widely regarded as one of Wright's finest creations" but that it was still attractive to filmmakers. Boston Globe architectural critic Robert Campbell wrote that the textile blocks "give the house an unforgettably exotic character", while Scott Frank said that the unconventional design features were especially well-suited to popular media appearances. Robert Sweeney criticized the Ennises' design changes as not having improved the building, and he regarded the house overall as having overused oversized design details. Wright biographers Robert McCarter and Brendan Gill, and concrete-industry expert Edward Losch, all described the house as having a massive scale that dominated the hillside. Another scholar wrote in 2019 that the house's concrete-block construction and hilltop location made it look "massive, hermetic and sculptured".

Several reviewers commented on the house's architectural style. A 1991 article for the Los Angeles Times said that the house had variously been characterized as "a mausoleum, fortress, Tibetan monument, Mayan temple, and palace". A writer for the Associated Press described the Ennis House in 2005 as resembling "a temple straight out of an Indiana Jones movie", while Architectural Digest wrote that "the style is more Raiders of the Lost Ark than a Buddhist monastery". Filmmaker magazine wrote in 2006 that the Ennis House was Wright's "modern-materials take on the Mayan tomb vibe", a sentiment echoed by David Gebhard and Scot Zimmerman. In a Los Angeles Times survey in December 2008, architectural experts ranked the house as one of the city's top ten residences; the Los Angeles Times stated that "the Ennis House suggests what the greatest of Modernists would have done with a commission from the Maya Empire 700 years earlier". The architectural historian Vincent Scully said the house resembled "some avenging phantom from the pre-Columbian past", while Gill believed that it was more akin to a Mayan god's shrine than a family residence. The biographer Meryle Secrest wrote that all of Wright's textile-block houses were "monumental, aloof and irresistibly Mayan in feeling".

Critics also praised the interior design. Diane Keaton praised the transition from the cramped entrance vestibule to the spacious living room in 2007, a sentiment repeated by Campbell, who likened it to the design of Wright's Coonley and Robie houses in Illinois. An NPR reporter said in 2009 that "The outside, with its high walls and sharp edges, is definitely dramatic, but it's the inside that takes visitors' breath away." Another reporter for Curbed wrote in 2019: "As impressive as the concrete fortress is from the outside, its interiors are divine."

=== Architectural influence and landmark designations ===
The design of the Ennis House inspired that of another house across Glendower Avenue, designed in 2008 by Barbara Bestor. Wright's son Lloyd, who helped build the house, later went on to design similarly styled houses like the Sowden House. The design of the house's exterior tiles was replicated in a diner in Hoboken, New Jersey, and a writer for the British newspaper The Observer noted that the house's design might have also influenced the design elements of the Hayward Gallery in London. In the 1980s, the design firm F. Schumacher & Co. began selling wall coverings and printed fabrics with patterns based on the Ennis House's textile blocks. The following decade, the window manufacturer Andersen Corporation began selling windows inspired by the Ennis House's art-glass panes.

The Ennis House, along with three other textile-block houses designed by Wright, is designated as California Historical Landmark number 1011. The house was added to the National Register of Historic Places in 1971 and designated as a Los Angeles Historic-Cultural Monument in 1976. Additionally, it was documented by the Historical American Building Survey in 1969.

== See also ==
- Los Angeles Historic-Cultural Monuments in Hollywood
- List of Frank Lloyd Wright works
- List of Registered Historic Places in Los Angeles
