= Millard House (Pasadena, California) =

Historic house in Pasadena, California

- Millard House; La Miniatura
- U.S. National Register of Historic Places
- U.S. Historic district – Contributing property
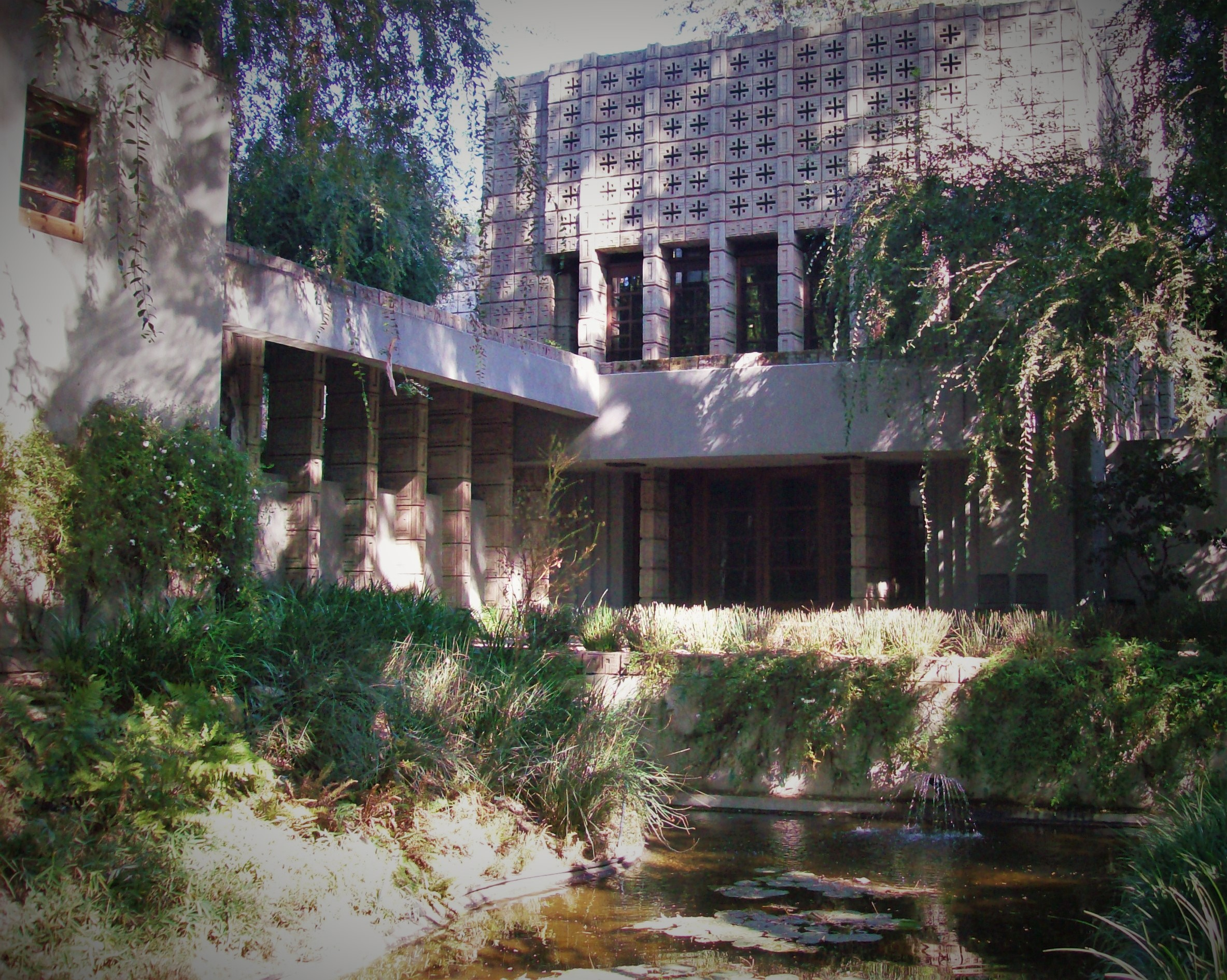

- Location within the Los Angeles metropolitan area Location within California Location within the United States
- Location: 645 Prospect Crescent, Pasadena, California
- Coordinates: 34°09′19.6″N 118°09′42.4″W
- Built: 1923
- Architect: Frank Lloyd Wright; Lloyd Wright
- Architectural style: Mayan Revival, Textile Block
- Part of: Prospect Historic District (ID83001202)
- NRHP reference No.: 76000493

Significant dates
- Added to NRHP: December 12, 1976
- Designated cp: April 7, 1983

The Millard House, commonly known as La Miniatura, is a house at 645 Prospect Crescent in Pasadena, a suburb of Los Angeles, California, United States. Designed by Frank Lloyd Wright, it was completed in 1924 for the rare-book dealer Alice Millard. The house was the first of four concrete textile block houses that Wright designed in Greater Los Angeles in the 1920s, the others being the Samuel Freeman House, the Storer House, and the Ennis House. It was Wright's second design for Millard's family, after the George Madison Millard House in Illinois. La Miniatura is listed on the National Register of Historic Places and is a contributing property to the Prospect Historic District.

The Millard House is a three-story structure with a detached garage, which sits on an arroyo with a ravine at the bottom. It has two entrances: a pedestrian entrance on the first story, facing Rosemont Avenue to the west, and a vehicular entrance on the second story, facing Prospect Crescent to the east. The water table of the facade is made of stucco, while the rest of the house is clad in concrete textile blocks, which are engraved with cross-shaped motifs. Inside, the house has 4,230 square feet (393 m^{2}) of space, with a floor plan shaped like two overlapping squares. There is a dining room on the first floor, a living room on the second floor, and bedrooms on all three floors. Wood, plaster, and concrete are used as decorations throughout the house, and there are balconies in the living room and the topmost bedroom.

Millard bought the site in 1923, several years after moving to Pasadena, and rehired Wright to design her new house. A. C. Parlee received the general contract to build the house in March 1923, but Parlee quit partway through construction, leaving Wright and Millard to complete the house themselves. The house was finished c. April 1924, and Millard used the house to sell and exhibit her collection of old books and other objects. Wright's son Lloyd designed a gallery to the north of La Miniatura in 1926, and Millard hosted various public exhibits in the gallery and her house over the next decade. After Millard died in 1938, the Daniels family owned the house for six decades. The television producer Barry Sloane bought the house in 1998 and renovated it for several million dollars. Sloane placed the house for sale in 2008, though it was not sold until 2015, when an anonymous Chinese couple bought it.

== Site ==
The Millard House (or La Miniatura) is located at 645 Prospect Crescent in Pasadena, a suburb of Los Angeles, California, United States. It occupies part of a pentagonal tract that faces east toward Prospect Crescent and west toward Rosemont Avenue (originally Lester Avenue). The original owner, the rare-book dealer Alice Millard, initially owned only the 210-by-110-foot (64 by 34 m) western portion of the tract before acquiring adjacent land in the 1920s and 1930s. The modern-day tract covers about 0.93 acres (0.38 ha).

The Millard House was built in the Prospect Park subdivision of Pasadena and is a contributing property to the Prospect Historic District. The surrounding area includes houses in various styles, designed by architects such as Greene and Greene, Myron Hunt, and Wallace Neff. The Louise C. Bentz House, whose original owner had sold land to Millard c. 1923, is immediately across Prospect Crescent to the east. Gartz Court at 745 North Pasadena Avenue is also located nearby, to the east.

The Prospect Park subdivision was parceled out in 1906. The house is located on an arroyo, a dry valley that turns into a waterway after rain. As such, its basement is prone to flash flooding. The Millard House's positioning contrasted with that of other buildings that the house's architect Frank Lloyd Wright designed in Greater Los Angeles, which tended to be located atop hills. Wright had reportedly selected the site after seeing it from the top of a nearby hill where Millard had originally intended to build. To more closely associate the house with its site, Wright added a pond next to the house, within the arroyo.

== Architecture ==
The Millard House or La Miniatura is one of eight buildings that Wright designed in Greater Los Angeles, alongside houses like the Storer House, the Hollyhock House, the Ennis House, and the Freeman House. (Note: Besides these houses, Wright's three other works in Greater Los Angeles are the Anderton Court Building in Beverly Hills, the Sturges House in Brentwood, and the Arch Oboler House's gatehouse on Mulholland Drive.) The Ennis, Freeman, Millard, and Storer houses were the only four textile block houses he designed in Los Angeles. According to the writer Hugh Hart, "Wright saw his Textile Block Method approach as an utterly modern, and democratic, expression of his organic architecture ideal." Few of his clients ended up commissioning textile-block designs, given the novelty of the construction method. As The New York Times later said: "Aside from the free-spirited oil heiress Aline Barnsdall, whom he fought with constantly, his motley clients included a jewelry salesman [Samuel Freeman], a rare-book dealing widow [Alice Millard] and a failed doctor [John Storer]." After designing the four textile-block houses, Wright went on to design various concrete-block buildings across the U.S., including Usonian houses made of "Usonian Automatic" blocks. In his later life, Wright sometimes referred to La Miniatura as his first Usonian house. (Note: However, the Herbert and Katherine Jacobs First House is cited as Wright's first true Usonian structure.) One of Wright's biographers, Brendan Gill, wrote that the house's design was similar to contemporary designs by Le Corbusier.

As built, the house has two entrances: a vehicular entrance from Prospect Crescent and a pedestrian entrance from Rosemont Avenue. The house occupies the far east side of the lot, where the arroyo slopes upward, to provide easier views of the house from Rosemont Avenue and vice versa. As such, Wright designed the house to cling to the lot's steep ravine, nestled among the trees. The main entrance is underneath the footbridge connecting the main house and a detached garage. A series of terraces outside the house descend into the ravine, and there is a garden and pool within the ravine. Next to the original building is a rectangular wood-frame gallery building, connected to La Miniatura by a footbridge. Originally known as the Doll's House, it was designed by Wright's son Lloyd Wright.

=== Exterior ===
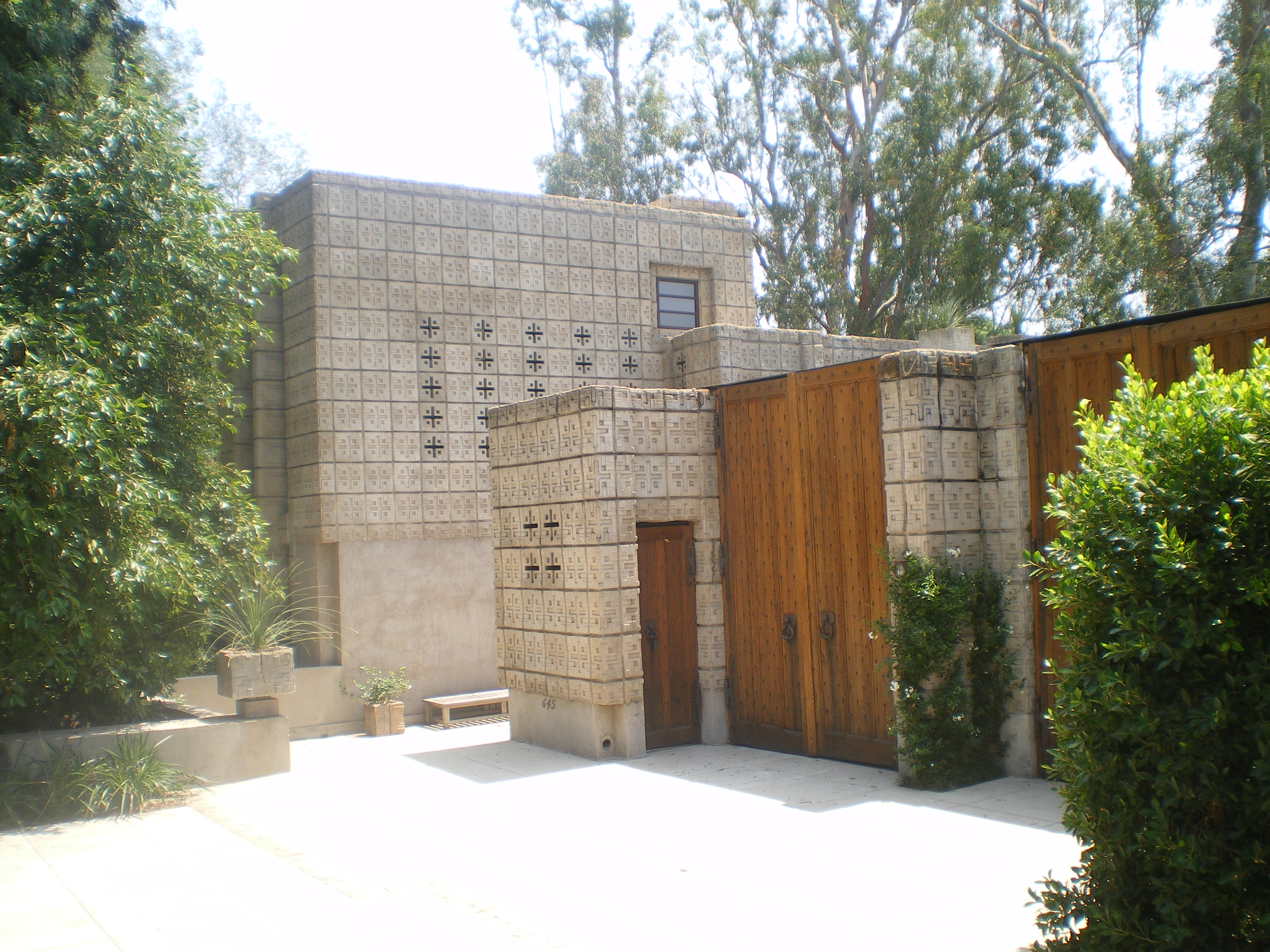
View from Prospect Crescent. The three-story bedroom section is visible at left, while the main entrance is through the wooden gate at right.

The water table of the facade is made of stucco, while the rest of the house is clad in textile blocks. An early plan had also called for larger blocks measuring 24 by 24 inches (610 by 610 mm), which would have made them substantially heavier. Wright fabricated the house's concrete blocks using sand, gravel, and minerals found on the property. By using roughly textured, earth-toned blocks, Wright sought to blend the house with the color and form of the trees and hillside, saying that the Millard House "belonged to the ground on which it stood". The textile blocks differ from those used in Wright's later textile-block houses. Whereas the other houses' tiles are fixed to reinforcing bars, the Millard House's tiles are interlocked together; steel bars are still used in the joints between each block. Another difference is that Wright reinforced the blocks using conventional mortar, while in the other houses, the blocks are fastened together using steel loops. The blocks on the house are laid in an undulating pattern.

Many of the blocks are square units measuring 16 by 16 inches (410 by 410 mm) across, but there are variants that measure one-half or one-quarter that size. Some of the half-sized blocks, measuring 8 by 16 inches (200 by 410 mm), are used around window and door openings, and some blocks of each type are perforated. An early plan had also called for larger blocks measuring 24 by 24 inches (610 by 610 mm), which would have made them substantially heavier. The blocks were created in wooden molds with patterns on the outside and smooth on the inside. The blocks feature a symmetrical cruciform pattern, with squares in each corner of a cross; this motif creates an interwoven pattern whenever several of the blocks are placed next to each other. Almost all of the blocks on the facade contain the cruciform motif; according to the historian Robert Sweeney, this served to de-emphasize the design details. It is not clear why this specific pattern was selected, although the Los Angeles Times cites a curator at Los Angeles County Museum of Art as saying that the motif may be an allusion to a pre-Columbian compass rose.

Compared with Wright's other work (which tended to be more horizontally oriented), the Millard House emphasized more of its vertical design details. According to the National Park Service, the emphasis on vertical details may have been an allusion to Alice Millard's occupation as a book dealer. The original plan called for perforated concrete blocks to be installed atop a window on the eastern elevation of the facade, but this was removed in the final design. Double-paned glass windows are installed between concrete piers on the facade. There are also stained glass windows created by the textile artist William Morris—a friend of Millard's—and the designer Edward Burne-Jones. The house includes a concrete frame for further reinforcement.

=== Interior ===
La Miniatura has an interior floor area of 4,230 square feet (393 m^{2}). The Los Angeles County website and some sources cite the residence as having three bedrooms and three bathrooms, while The Wall Street Journal cites it as having four bedrooms and four bathrooms. The house is three stories high, being arranged around a central core; including the roof terrace, the house has four levels. The floor plan is shaped roughly like two overlapping squares, which intersect in the core, and are placed along a grid of squares measuring 16 inches across, with joists hidden under the floor beams. Wood, plaster, and concrete are used as decorations throughout the house. Unlike Wright's other houses, in which he designed most or all of the furniture inside, Wright did not design much of La Miniatura's furniture, except for some living-room bookshelves.

The house's garage and entrance are located on the eastern side of the building, facing Prospect Crescent. Due to the slope of the site, the main entrance is through the second floor, where the double-height living room is located. This arrangement is similar to the palazzo-style layout that Millard had admired, where the main rooms were on a piano nobile above the ground level. The second floor is accessed by a narrow entrance hall with a concrete floor, a 6-foot-8-inch (2.03 m) plaster ceiling, and textile-block walls. The living room walls are composed of both plain and decorated textile blocks. The western wall has a screen of perforated blocks, facing the ravine; the perforations are infilled with small glass shards to keep water out. The living room is designed with a fireplace and balcony, the latter of which rests on a set of concrete beams supported by patterned textile-block piers. The ceiling spans 14 feet (4.3 m) high and is made of redwood beams. A pair of glass doors, with glass transom windows above, leads from the living room to a terrace. A sitting room leads off the living room.

On the first floor, there is a kitchen and a dining room opening onto a terrace. The dining room has a low ceiling and overlooks the pond next to it. The bedrooms are stacked on top of one another and are in the western section of the building, facing the ravine. There is one bedroom on all three floors; the bedroom on the first floor was initially intended for servants, while the second-floor bedroom was used as a guest room. The third floor contained Millard's bedroom with a balcony overlooking the living room and outdoor terrace. Millard's bedroom faces east and has a double-height ceiling, with a small balcony overlooking the room, similarly to the living room. The narrowest section of Millard's bedroom has a tall window facing the ravine to the west.

== History ==
The Millard House was one of multiple high-profile projects that Wright completed in the 1920s, along with his other Los Angeles houses and Tokyo's Imperial Hotel. After erecting the Millard House, Wright received the commissions for the Freeman, Ennis, and Storer houses nearly simultaneously. Prior to constructing the textile-block houses, Wright had used pre-Columbian motifs in other structures such as Chicago's Midway Gardens and Richland Center, Wisconsin's German Warehouse.

The Millard House was the second of two designed for the family of Alice Millard, a schoolteacher-turned-book dealer. Millard's husband George Madison Millard. a book seller, had hired Wright in 1906 to design them the first Millard House, a Prairie style structure in Highland Park, Illinois. The Millard family moved to California in the 1910s. (Note: Sources disagree on whether they moved in 1913 or 1914. George's obituary from November 1918 indicates that he moved to Pasadena approximately five years previously, which would place their relocation date at c. 1913–1914.) After George Millard died in 1918, Alice continued her husband's collection, selling some of George's investments and taking out loans to pay for merchandise. The Millard collection came to include not only books, but also artifacts such as furniture and artwork, and Millard wanted to construct at least one building to display and sell these items.

=== Development ===
==== Site selection and design ====
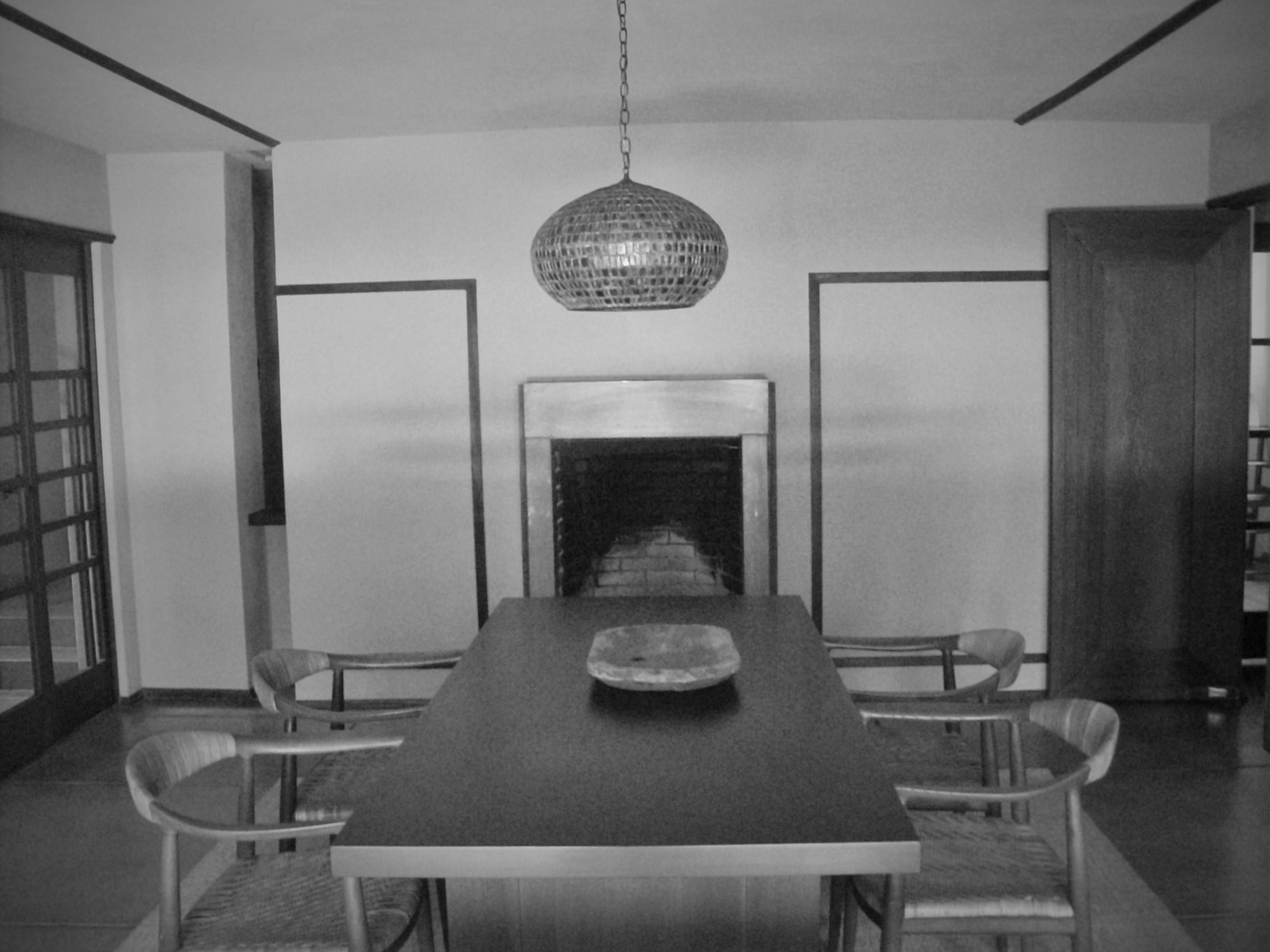
Interior

Around 1923, Millard bought a site in the Prospect Park subdivision of Pasadena, measuring about 210 by 110 feet (64 by 34 m). She later obtained a 16-by-38-foot (4.9 by 11.6 m) lot to the northeast so she could access the site from Prospect Crescent. Millard hired Wright—who at the time was busy designing the Doheny Ranch project for the oil magnate Edward L. Doheny—to design her new house in Pasadena. At that point, fewer than 10% of Wright's clients had rehired him for another project; as Wright later wrote, "I determined she should have the best I had in my portfolio." This account was disputed; Sweeney wrote that Wright had instead brought up the idea of a new house to Millard, as he wanted to test out a new design concept that he had been thinking about. According to Sweeney, Millard had not been thinking about a new house in Pasadena; to get Millard to agree to his plan, Wright offered to temporarily waive his architect's fee.

Prior to designing Millard's second house, Wright had been considering a textile-block design, having been inspired by a trip to Japan; the Millard House was to become Wright's first concrete-block design. According to The New York Times, he had contemplated the design after asking himself, "Why not weave a kind of building?". Although he had previously used square terracotta-and-concrete blocks in structures like the Midway Gardens and Imperial Hotel, these structures did not use concrete blocks as part of their superstructure, like La Miniatura did. In creating the house, Wright wrote that he had used the textile-block system because he believed he could "do away with skilled labor" and eliminate the need for mortar joints. Wright also said he wanted to convert "that despised outcast of the building industry", the concrete block, into an object of beauty.

Millard had stipulated that the house could not cost more than $10,000. Although Millard had initially wanted to build on a plateau, Wright subsequently convinced her to buy an alternate plot nearby, at the bottom of a ravine. According to Wright, the alternate site was cheap because it was "undesirable". This site had two eucalyptus trees, unlike Millard's original site, which had no trees at all. Wright envisioned that the house would rise from the bottom of the ravine, between the two trees. The house was to be known as La Miniatura, Spanish for "the miniature", since it was to be a relatively small, low-cost structure. Millard had specified that the house include a large living room, a master bedroom, and a guest room (the last of which could also be used as an office). Wright wrote in his autobiography that Millard wanted a dining room and servants' quarters, and that she did not want any cheap materials or poor workmanship.

Wright worked on the plans while simultaneously designing Doheny Ranch, and by early 1923, he had sketched out plans for a house with patterned concrete tiles and flat roofs. The artist Olive Percival, a friend of Millard's, said that February that Millard wanted a palazzo–style house with a raised main floor. Wright appointed his apprentice Rudolph Schindler as the construction supervisor, while Wright's son Lloyd was tasked with completing the working drawings for the house. Early drawings for the house indicated a system of interlocking "male" and "female" blocks; however, details of these blocks' designs are scarce. Lloyd's drawings show that the house was to have a scored-concrete floor, a concrete frame, plaster walls, and plaster or wood ceilings.

==== Construction ====
Millard awarded the house's general construction contract to a local company named A. C. Parlee for $9,810 after Pasadena officials approved the drawings on March 15, 1923. Work on the foundation had just been approved, and site excavation began soon after that. Wright's son Lloyd Wright supervised the construction. Over the next two months, the blocks' designs were modified. The government of Pasadena approved a new-building permit for the house on July 10. By then, the house's exterior walls were partially complete. Unlike for Wright's later textile-block houses, the specifications for the blocks used in La Miniatura do not survive in full, and many details of the blocks are known only from Wright's autobiography. Whatever drawings did exist were vague, requiring the contractor to devise their own interpretation of Wright's plans. In his autobiography, Wright wrote that he combined a certain ratio of gravel, cement, and sand, then poured that aggregate into a wooden mold. Since the molds tended to warp when they were warm, they could not be used to create blocks to precise dimensions; as such, some of the blocks vary slightly. Some of Parlee's relatives who lived nearby helped create the blocks.

Millard left for Europe in mid-1923, after construction had reached the second story. Wright temporarily reassigned Parlee away from La Miniatura's construction that August, asking the company to instead construct one of the guest houses outside Hollyhock House on Olive Hill in Hollywood. As a direct result, by November 1923, the construction of La Miniatura was running significantly behind the original schedule. Parlee was also hired in late 1923 to construct a theater, the Little Dipper, near the Hollyhock House. When the Little Dipper project was canceled a short time later, Wright ordered his bank not to pay Parlee any further; at the time, Parlee had already collected $8,961.50 for his construction of La Miniatura. At the beginning of 1924, Parlee quit from his job as La Miniatura's construction contractor.

After the original contractor's resignation, Wright and Millard took over the final stages of the house's construction. Sweeney wrote that the sudden change in plans had cost Millard an additional $8,636.45. As with Wright's other textile-block buildings, the construction cost significantly exceeded its original budget because of the unusual construction methods that were used. The project cost has been variously cited as $17,000 (which would have made it 70% over budget) or $18,000 (80% over budget). Despite this, Millard felt that the house's design was worth the extra cost. As Millard would later tell Wright, "Your conduct and mine in the construction of 'La Miniatura' is incomprehensible even to ourselves."

=== Millard use ===
==== Completion and early years ====
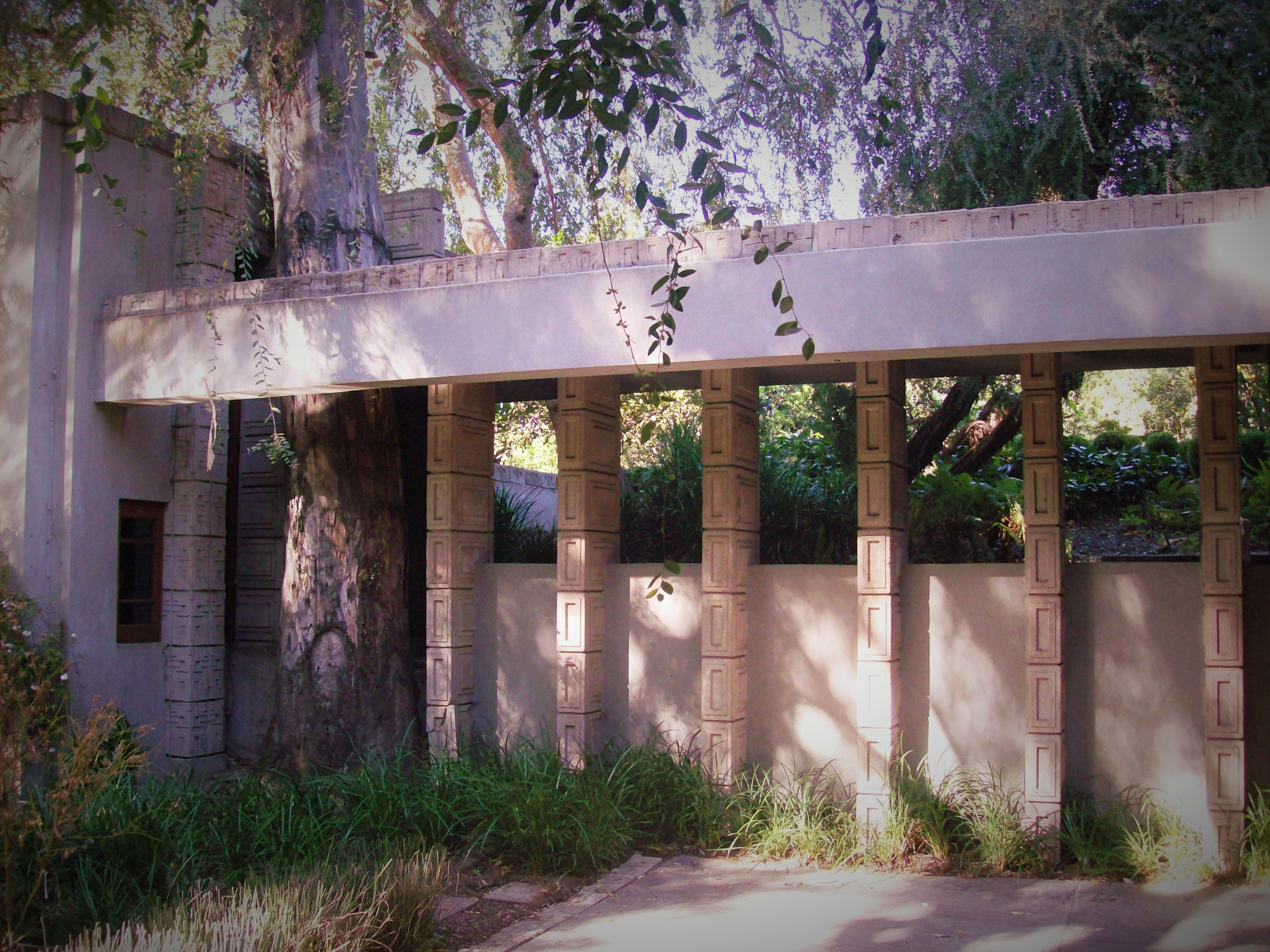
Decorative detail of the house's exterior

The house was completed c. April 1924. When Millard lived in La Miniatura, she sold books and furniture in the living room. Millard kept a large collection of old books, including the first editions of various manuscripts, two books printed on vellum in 1470, as well as centuries-old Egyptian papyrus sheets. She also collected other objects such as Sheffield plate objects, Flemish tapestries, and Middle Ages bas-reliefs. Wright wrote that he had been pleased to help Millard acquire "the old books and other old things". Initially, Millard publicly exhibited some pieces from her book collection at the Biltmore Los Angeles hotel once a year. In addition, she traveled to Europe annually, staying at La Miniatura during the winter. An East Indian royal, Count Robert de Clairmont, lived at La Miniatura during 1924, while Millard temporarily lived at the Biltmore after returning from her Europe trip that year.

Parlee sued Millard for breach of contract in June 1924, saying that Millard owed him more than $12,000 because she had failed to follow the original blueprints, and Wright filed a counter-suit to have Parlee pay off the additional cost that Millard had been forced to spend. At a trial in 1925, Parlee claimed that Millard had deviated from the plans by using two layers of blocks in the exterior walls, rather than one, while Wright claimed that the exact specifications were not written down because he had told the contractor verbally. Ultimately, Parlee lost the lawsuit; Wright wrote that the contractor had to pay Millard $500 for "effrontery". Another issue concerned the house's leakiness, a common flaw of Wright's designs. The lower level once flooded after a drain backed up during one particularly bad storm in 1926; following this incident, Millard wrote to Wright, complaining that the floodwaters had reached up to six inches (152 mm) in the dining room. In the long run, the composition of the textile blocks was inherently flawed, as it leaked greatly. Millard's financial counselor had advised her that the house was virtually unsaleable due to its unconventional layout and its inferior construction material.

By 1925, Millard wanted to exhibit her books on her own property. She contacted Wright to ask whether he was interested in designing a gallery next to her house, but three months elapsed without a reply. Sources published after 1942 cite Wright as having designed a gallery for Millard in 1925, but Sweeney writes that there is no record of Wright having devised a design at that time. In any case, Millard asked Lloyd to design the gallery instead. He completed the structure in 1926, and the gallery held its first exhibit in February 1927. Lloyd's gallery, informally known as the Doll's House, was accessed via a footbridge ran from the living-room terrace. Millard and Frank both disliked the completed gallery, although Frank had approved of his son's design before it had been built, and Millard asked the elder Wright to add pilasters to the Doll's House to "give a sense of depth to those openings". Nonetheless, the Doll's House gradually became a popular site for exhibitions. It displayed literary artifacts from multiple eras, ranging from clay tablets and papyrus to modern-day literature. The Doll's House was initially open only on Saturdays, but it became so popular that, by March 1927, the gallery was open daily during the morning and mid-afternoon.

==== Unfinished expansions and further changes ====
Within two years of the studio's completion, Millard had run out of space. Millard wrote to Wright in April 1928, while he was designing the Arizona Biltmore Hotel, and invited him to design houses on two sites (lots 11 and 12) just north of her own residence. While she did not yet own these sites, she wanted to build a two-story house with three to four bedrooms on either site. During the middle of that year, Millard traveled to Europe, leasing the original house to the family of her friend John S. Mitchell. Lot 12 had been sold to someone else by 1929, leaving only lot 11 (the lot closest to La Miniatura) available for development. Accordingly, Wright sent Millard some plans that March, which called for a two-story building connected to La Miniatura's garage, composed of a double-height living and dining room on its lower level and three bedrooms on the upper level. Also in 1929, Millard began charging an admission fee to La Miniatura's gallery to raise money for a memorial to the printmaker William Morris.

One of Millard's friends bought lot 11 in 1929, but it remained empty for several years. At that point, Millard suggested building a second gallery on the 32-foot-wide (9.8 m) lot just south of La Miniatura, and she was attempting to buy land to the east to provide direct street access to the second gallery. By April 1929, Wright had drawn up preliminary sketches for the second gallery, which was to be a two-story structure measuring 25 by 50 feet (7.6 by 15.2 m) across, attached to the existing house via a footbridge. The 1929 sketches do not survive; Millard took the sketches to Europe and promptly lost them. Wright subsequently drew up a second sketch in January 1930, which called for a rectangular structure measuring 28 by 72 feet (8.5 by 21.9 m). The structure would have a gallery room measuring 18 feet (5.5 m) high. A footbridge was to connect the second gallery building's balcony with that of La Miniatura's living room, and there would be a staircase descending from the secondary gallery's terrace to the ravine. Millard obtained a construction permit for the second gallery that August. The second gallery was originally supposed to cost $15,000, which was revised downward to $11,000 in September 1930. Millard could not afford either figure, canceling the plans at the end of that year.

Millard's friend Gordon Kaufmann again suggested constructing the second gallery in 1931, proposing that La Miniatura be converted into a museum. Millard was authorized to build an annex to her property that January, receiving a new-building permit for a "studio building" that April. However. she had to cancel the project again since "nobody could find any money". She acquired the rest of the ravine, as well as an adjoining parcel, but was ultimately unable to construct any expansions other than relatively small additions to the Doll's House and the garage. Lloyd oversaw the expansion of the garage, for which Millard received a building permit in 1931. The next year, F. H. Ruppel was hired to design modifications to La Miniatura. Lloyd was hired to expand the Doll's House, a project which was completed in 1933; the roof was repaired that year.

Millard opened her house to the public on several occasions, including a 1929 showcase of medical literature, a 1933 exhibition of objects by T. J. Cobden-Sanderson, a 1934 showcase of ancient manuscripts and early books, and various exhibitions celebrating Morris. Millard sought to resell lot 11 in 1934 and asked Wright to devise additional plans for that site. A couple had expressed interest in lot 11, but they decided to buy another lot after Wright took his time responding; he eventually sent Millard five plans, none of which were ever built. Millard continued to live at La Miniatura, hiring a contractor to repair the roof in 1937; she died there in 1938. Her collection was acquired by several friends who gave it to the Huntington Library in San Marino, California. The Huntington Library's curator, Robert O. Schad, wrote that the house "remains as a tribute to her life's work and as a reflection of her rare personality".

=== Later use ===
==== Daniels ownership ====
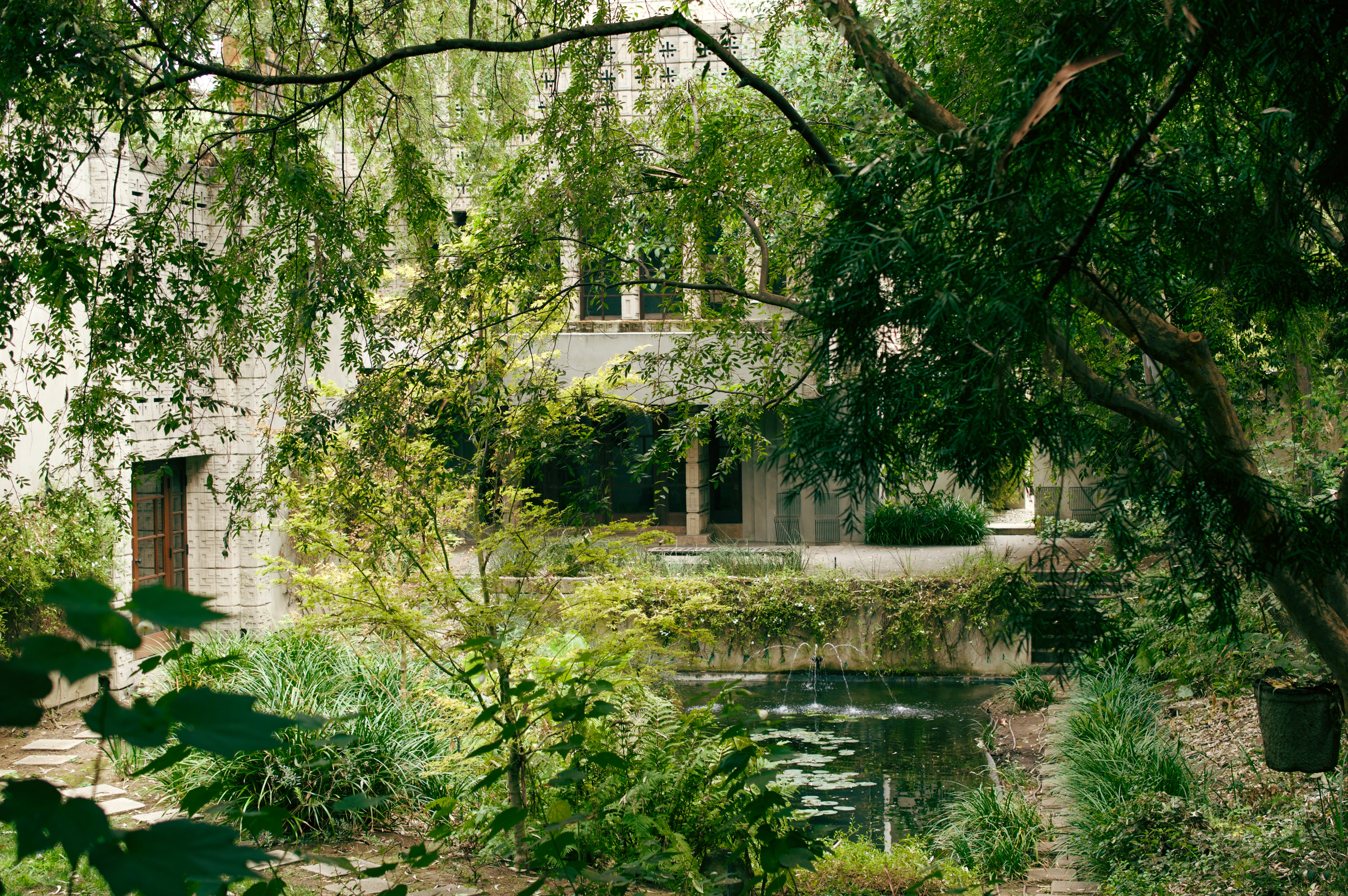
The house as seen from the ravine to the west. There is a reflecting pool outside.

After Millard's death, La Miniatura was sold to Donald Potter Daniels, a sculptor who lived nearby; his family owned it for more than five decades. After moving in, Daniels submitted plans to Pasadena's government in 1940 for $1,500 worth of alterations to the house. He hired R. M. Illsley to make the changes, and Daniels repaired the roof the next year. According to Daniels's granddaughter Nicole, he furnished the space with Mediterranean furniture and painted over the redwood. Daniels's wife told the Pasadena Independent in 1959 that La Miniatura received about 500 to 700 visitors every year, including fans of Wright's work from around the world. Daniels sometimes gave tours of the house as well.

Daniels received a preservation award from the Pasadena Beautiful Foundation in 1969, commemorating his family's preservation of the Millard House. The house was added to the National Register of Historic Places in 1976; the National Park Service's report stated that the house was significant not only because of Wright's design, but also because of Millard's involvement in the Southern California cultural scene. In the 1990s, Nicole Daniels inherited La Miniatura from her grandfather. She renovated the house, and the interior designer Annie Kelly and the artist Christian Granvelle redecorated one of the rooms with gray plaster walls. Kelly also added furniture to the house's living room, and the firm of Offenhauser/Mekeel was hired to restore the studio structure, replacing the facade. The Los Angeles Conservancy gave one of its preservation awards to La Miniatura in 1995 after the renovation was complete. Nicole had placed the house for sale the previous year with an asking price of $3.45 million.

==== Sloane ownership and resale ====
In 1996, the real-estate agent Crosby Doe recommended that the film producer David Zander look at the house. Zander later recalled Doe telling him: "David, this is one of the great houses in L.A., but it needs work." Zander decided to buy La Miniatura and later purchased another house in the neighborhood. In the 2000s, Zander began renovating La Miniatura, hiring Marmol Radziner + Associates to oversee the renovation. Annie Kelly was also rehired to help renovate the house after Zander expressed admiration for the color scheme of Kelly's house. La Miniatura remained in relatively good condition during that decade, in contrast to the Ennis and Freeman houses, which were operated by public entities and were in various stages of disrepair. By contrast, one member of the Daniels family claimed that the landscape had been left to deteriorate over the years. Sources disagree on whether he had spent $2.5 million, $3 million, or $4 million to renovate the house.

The house was opened to limited public viewing in 2008 for the first time in 16 years; over a thousand people came from across the United States to observe the house. The same year, Zander placed the house for sale at $7.733 million. Zander had been confident that the house would be sold quickly, but due to a lack of interest, the asking price had been reduced to $6.95 million or $5.95 million by late 2009. The asking price was reduced further the same year, amid speculation that Japanese investors wanted to buy the house and relocate it. Los Angeles Times writer Sam Watters said in 2010: "The concrete is crumbling; the house is cramped, with no room for the essential spa, wine cellar, theater, gym, ocean-scale fish tank and wood-burning pizza oven; the infamous roof continues to defy technology." By 2013 the house had still not been sold, and its asking price had been lowered to $4.5 million. That year, Doe told The Wall Street Journal that the house's roof still leaked.

La Miniatura remained unsold until 2015, when it was acquired by Acme Int. Capital Management for $3.65 million. The real owners' identities were not made public, but they were described in the Financial Times as a couple from China. The house remained a private residence, though the writer Audrey Wachs of The Architect's Newspaper noted in 2018 that the owners were willing to consider inviting would-be visitors who left them a bottle of wine. The exterior of the residence is also a destination on guided tours.

== Impact ==
=== Reception ===
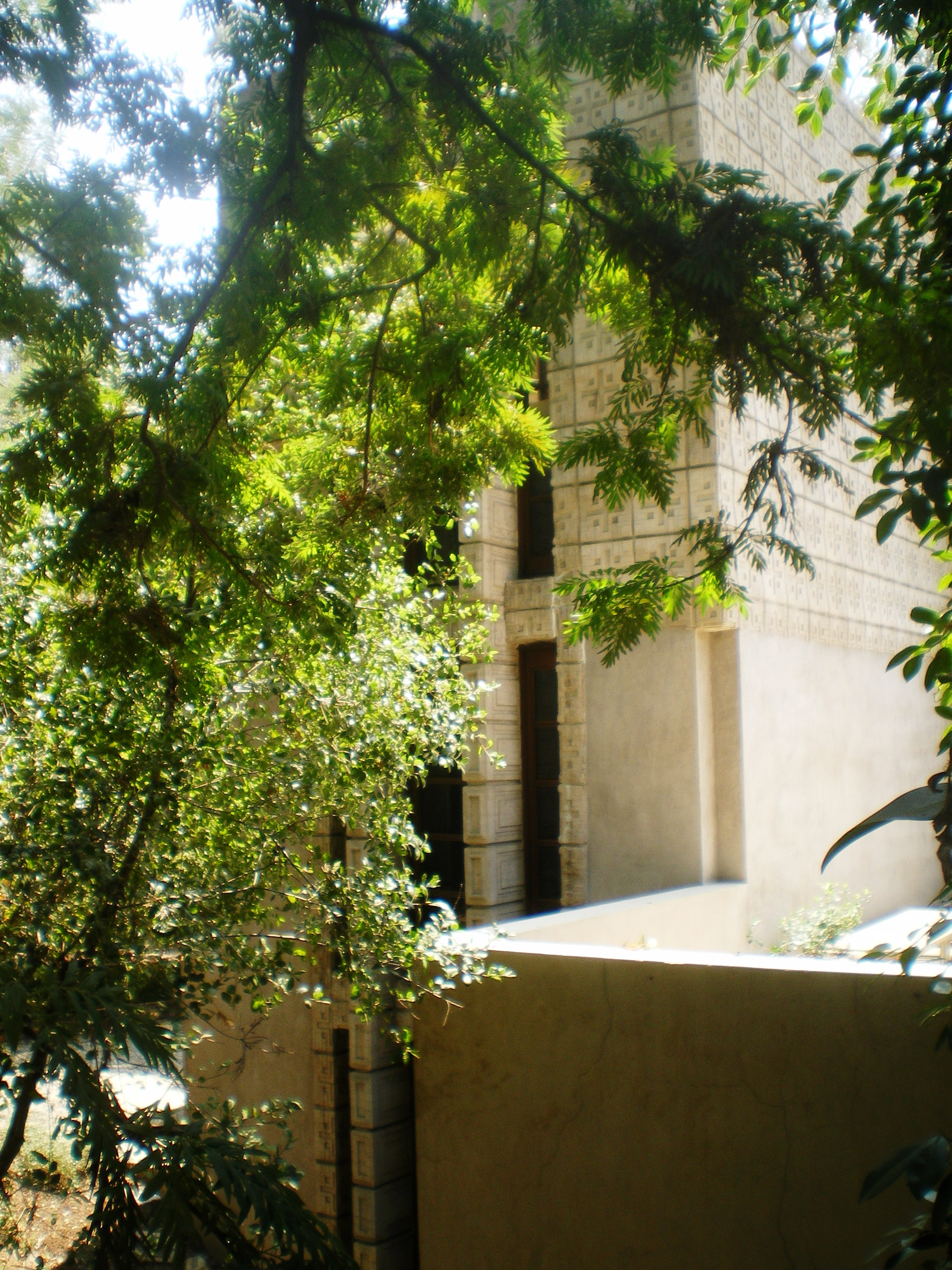
Side view showing the three stories of bedrooms

The initial critical response to La Miniatura and the other textile block structures was mixed. Charles Lockwood of the Los Angeles Times wrote that the homes were greeted with "howls of laughter", as Beaux Arts-trained architects were "appalled" to see a common building material used for the facades and interior walls of expensive homes. Conversely, one visitor, Alexander Inglis, visited the home and subsequently described it as having been "endowed with architectural beauty and a unique old-world atmosphere". Another critic, Arthur Miller of the Los Angeles Times, called it "a completely modern house in which fine old things can quite naturally be themselves". Wright himself took great pride in his design of La Miniatura, saying that "I would rather have built this little house than St. Peter's in Rome", and writing about the building extensively in his autobiography. Wright claimed that he had encountered as many challenges with the project as the architects of New York City's Cathedral of St. John the Divine or Woolworth Building had experienced.

When Millard died, the Los Angeles Times called it one of Wright's "most beautiful architectural achievements". In 1965, Los Angeles Times columnist Art Seidenbaum wrote: "Environmentally, the place is fascinating because it still looks modern in a neighborhood that is gracious but aging. Or, maybe better, the Millard house is of no time and its own place." Four years later, a panel of ten distinguished citizens and architecture experts ranked La Miniatura one of the 12 most significant landmarks in the Los Angeles area. In 1980, The New York Times noted that La Miniatura was known around the world and ranked it among the few buildings in Los Angeles that had become 20th-century architectural icons. The architectural historian Henry-Russell Hitchcock described the house's perforated concrete blocks as "sparkling penetrations", and the preservationist Jim Dunham described the house as "Mayan style, set in a jungle ravine". The biographer Meryle Secrest wrote that all of Wright's textile-block houses were "monumental, aloof and irresistibly Mayan in feeling", and she said that La Miniatura in particular appeared imposing even though it was small.

Sweeney wrote in his 1994 book Wright in Hollywood that the house "is the most perfect of the block houses built on the West Coast", because, unlike the other three block houses, it had retained Wright's original design without many modifications. Christopher Hawthorne of the Los Angeles Times agreed that the house was Wright's best design in Los Angeles because of its location next to a ravine, as well as its restrained design. Another Los Angeles Times reporter wrote in 2011 that La Miniatura "remains a piece of architectural genius, frozen in time", despite not being particularly well-known, while the Pasadena Star-News called it one of Wright's "masterpieces" in 2008. The Pittsburgh Tribune-Review called it "one of the world's most important works of residential architecture" in a 2015 article.

=== Media and influence ===
La Miniatura's design directly influenced the set design for a 1989 episode of the soap opera One Life to Live, whose art director Barry Robison had been inspired by the house because "it was American architecture". The house was depicted in "Blood Oath", a 1994 episode of the TV series Star Trek: Deep Space Nine, as well as in a music video for a rap song by Sean Combs, where it was depicted as the residence of a New World Order leader. It was also used as a filming location for the second season of HBO's science fiction series Westworld during 2018, when the building was on sale. Although the Westworld production team had wanted to shoot the series' third season at the house, the house's new owners would not allow any filming inside, so a set resembling the house's interior was built instead. One writer for The Salt Lake Tribune wrote in 2007 that the house's Mesoamerican architectural details may have helped inspire some architectural details in the LDS Conference Center in Salt Lake City.

== See also ==
- List of Frank Lloyd Wright works
- National Register of Historic Places listings in Pasadena, California
