= Prospect Historic District =

Historic district in California, United States

- U.S. National Register of Historic Places
- U.S. Historic district
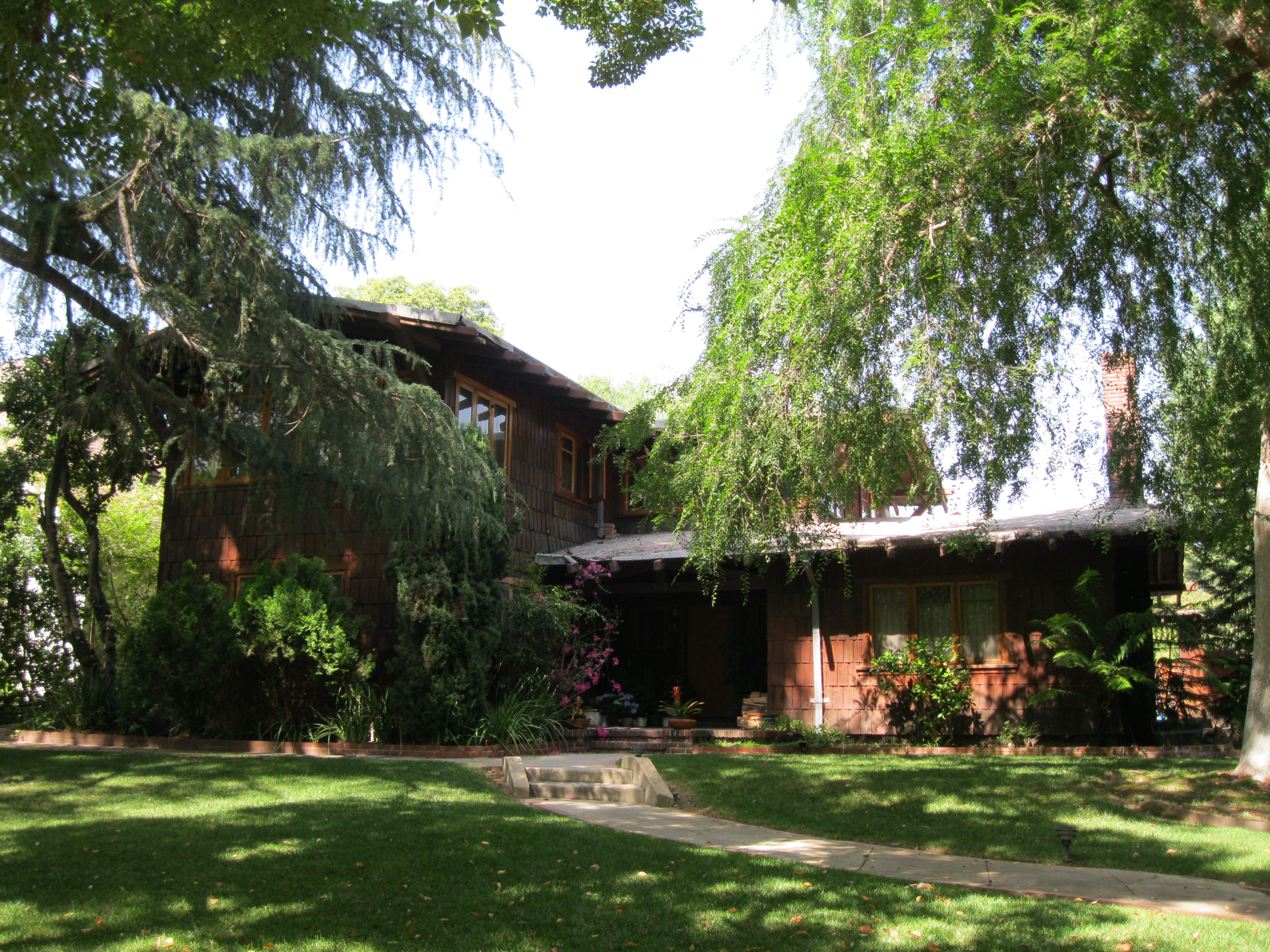
- 662 Prospect Boulevard

- Location within the Los Angeles metropolitan area Location within California Location within the United States
- Location: Prospect Blvd., Square, Crescent, and Terrace, Rosemont Ave., Armada and Fremont Drs., and La Mesa Pl., Pasadena, California
- Coordinates: 34°9′29″N 118°9′42″W
- Area: 68.9 acres (27.9 ha)
- NRHP reference No.: 83001202
- Added to NRHP: April 7, 1983

Prospect Historic District is a residential historic district in Pasadena, California, consisting of homes along Prospect Boulevard and several surrounding streets. The approximate northern boundary of the district is Westgate Street and the approximate southern boundary is Orange Grove Boulevard. The district includes 108 residences and roughly encompasses the Prospect Park and Arroyo Park Tracts, a pair of early Pasadena subdivisions.

Development on the Prospect Park Tract began in 1904, and the first house was built there in 1906. J.C. Brainerd, Nyles Eaton, and John C. Bentz acquired the 32-acre parcel adjacent to a Los Angeles and Salt Lake Railroad spur. The land was divided into 64 lots along wide curved streets planted with camphor and palm trees. The Arroyo Park Tract was first surveyed in 1910, and its development soon followed; the two tracts were linked by the Prospect Boulevard Bridge, which was built in 1908.

The houses in the district represent a wide variety of architectural styles and include works by several prominent architects, such as Frank Lloyd Wright's Millard House, Charles and Henry Greene's Bentz House, a 1909 mansion designed by Alfred and Arthur Heineman, and a 1922 private residence designed by Myron Hunt. The varied architecture of the district's homes is united by its landscaping, particularly through the camphor trees which line its streets.

Prospect Park is served by Cleveland Elementary School, Washington Middle School, and John Muir High School. Prospect Park is served by Metro Local line 256. It is also served by Pasadena Transit routes 51 and 52.

The district was added to the National Register of Historic Places on April 7, 1983.
