= George Madison Millard House =

Historic house in Highland Park, Illinois

- U.S. National Register of Historic Places
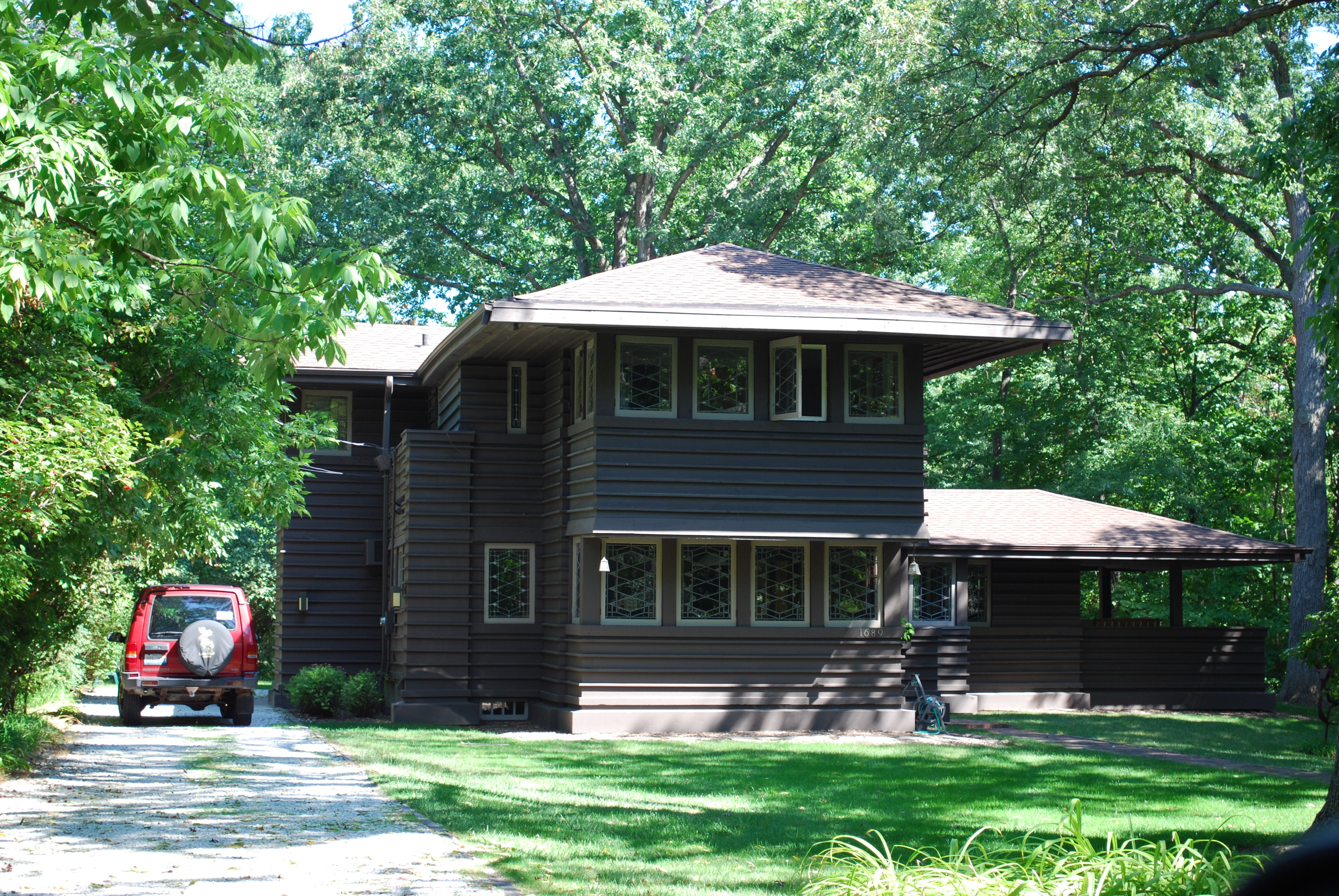

- Location within Illinois
- Location: Highland Park, Illinois
- Coordinates: 42°10′59″N 87°47′7″W
- Built: 1906
- Architect: Frank Lloyd Wright
- Architectural style: Prairie School
- NRHP reference No.: 82002571
- Added to NRHP: September 29, 1982

The George Madison Millard House is a house at 1689 Lake Avenue in Highland Park, Illinois, United States. Designed by Frank Lloyd Wright in the Prairie style, it was completed in 1906 for the rare-book dealer George Millard and his wife Alice Millard. It was the first of two houses that Wright designed for Alice Millard; the other is La Miniatura in Pasadena, California, which was built in 1923 after George died. The George Madison Millard House is listed on the National Register of Historic Places.

The house has a facade of brown-stained board and batten siding topped by a hipped roof. Inside, the house has a cruciform floor plan spanning approximately 3,000 square feet (280 m^{2}), with four bedrooms. The Millards lived in the house for about six or seven years and retained its original design afterward. After several sales, the Montenegro family bought the Millard House in 1992 and renovated it. The Millard House was listed for sale in 2011; after several unsuccessful attempts at selling it, the Millard House was sold in 2015 to the Rothner family, which renovated it again. The Rothners donated the house in 2019 to the Jewish Federation, which sold it the next year.

== Description ==
The George Madison Millard House is structure at 1689 Lake Avenue in the city of Highland Park, Illinois, United States. Designed by Frank Lloyd Wright in the Prairie style, it is one of three houses that he designed in the city; the other two are the Mary W. Adams House and Ward W. Willits House. The house occupies a site near Lake Michigan covering 0.66 acres (29,000 ft^{2}; 2,700 m^{2}). The house is a typical example of Wright's Prairie School houses. The exterior walls are brown-stained board and batten siding laid horizontally, and there are 68 art glass windows on the facade. The roof is hipped with 3.5-foot (1.1 m) overhangs. Wright later included drawings of the first Millard House in his Wasmuth Portfolio.

Inside, the Millard House has a cruciform floor plan, with a floor area spanning approximately 3,000 square feet (280 m^{2}). The house has four bedrooms and is variously described as having three or five bathrooms. The second-story master bedroom has a balcony and a fireplace. Another bedroom was originally used as a sewing room, while the laundry room and mudroom was originally a maid's bedroom. In addition, there is a cellar that can be used as an extra space. Next to the house is a garage that dates from a 2010s renovation.

== History ==
The George Madison Millard House was the first of two designed for the family of Alice Millard (née Parsons), a schoolteacher-turned-book dealer. Alice's husband George Madison Millard was the manager of the rare book department of A. C. McClurg in Chicago, Illinois. The Millards met at the bookstore and married at St Bride's Church in London in 1901. The Millards were acquainted with Frank Lloyd Wright and had him design this house in Highland Park in 1906 after the couple moved from the South Side of Chicago. The Millard family moved to California in the 1910s, (Note: Sources disagree on whether they moved in 1913, or 1914. George's obituary from November 1918 indicates that he moved to Pasadena approximately five years previously, which would place their relocation date at c. 1913–1914.) where George Millard died in 1918. Following the death of her husband, Alice carried on her husband's profession and also sold antique furniture. She had Wright design the Millard House in Pasadena in 1923.

The house remained mostly unchanged in the half-century after it was built. The Highland Park house was added to the National Register of Historic Places on September 29, 1982, being listed as part of the Highland Park Multiple Resource Area. It was also nominated as a municipal landmark twice, but in both cases, the owners of the house opposed the designation. Juan Montenegro and his wife Claire bought the house in 1992, paying $485,000. At the time, there were fabric coverings on the walls because plaster was flaking off the walls. Over the next two decades, the Montenegro family renovated the house, restoring the enclosed porch to its original, open-air design.

In 2011, the Millard House was listed for sale for $1.399 million. The Montenegro family attempted to sell the house for several years, but despite lowering the asking price several times, all the potential buyers wanted only the land, not the house itself. The owners had requested a demolition permit by July 2015, having been unable to sell the house for several years. The demolition permit was approved that October, though the Highland Park Historic Preservation Commission delayed the issuance of the demolition permit by one year. Shortly afterward, Gale Rothner drove by the house and saw that it was in danger of being demolished. She and her husband Eric Rothner purchased the Millard House in December 2015, paying $687,500. The new owners were theoretically allowed to demolish the house, but they decided against it.

Initially, the Rothners thought the renovation would last six months, but it ended up taking six times as long. They initially hired John Thorpe to design the renovation, but after Thorpe died midway through the project, they hired Douglas Gilbert as the architect. The project included replacing the mechanical systems and gutting the interior. The cellar, sewing room, and maid's rooms were repurposed, and new furniture such as bathroom dressers, a pantry, and a cabinet were added. The house was donated in December 2019 to the Jewish Federation. The organization listed the building for sale in mid-2020 and found a buyer after three days. The new owner reportedly paid $950,000. The Rothners won a Wright Spirit Award from the Frank Lloyd Wright Building Conservancy in 2022 for their preservation of the house.

== See also ==
- List of Frank Lloyd Wright works
- National Register of Historic Places listings in Lake County, Illinois

== Sources ==
- Starr, Kevin (1990). Material Dreams: Southern California Through the 1920s. Oxford University Press. ISBN 978-0-19-504487-4.
- Storrer, William Allin (1993). The Frank Lloyd Wright Companion. Chicago: University of Chicago Press. ISBN 978-0-226-77624-8. (S.126)
