= Alice Millard =

American bookseller (1873–1938)

Alice Parsons Millard (May 4, 1873 – July 15, 1938) was an American bookseller and promoter of culture in the Arroyo Seco region of Los Angeles County. She is widely known for commissioning Frank Lloyd Wright to build her house (La Miniatura) in Pasadena.

Millard was born in Jefferson City, Missouri. She had one sister, Emily.

== Chicago ==
After a few years, Millard's family moved to Chicago. In 1896 she and her sister were educated in Europe; Alice studied art in London. On a visit home to Chicago, she wandered into the Chicago book store operated by A.C. McClurg and asked for a book on William Morris. George M. Millard, who worked in the Rare Book Department, "was pleased to help the attractive young woman who had interests similar to his own," according to Ward Ritchie. A romance ensued and in 1901, Parsons accompanied Millard on a book-buying trip to England. Parsons was 28 when she married Millard (age 55) in St. Bridge's in London. The couple had one child, a daughter born in 1904 whose disabilities meant an institutionalized life.

In 1906, their friend Frank Lloyd Wright designed a house for them in the Prairie School style (now called the George Madison Millard House) located in the Highland Park suburb of Chicago.

== Pasadena ==
George and Alice Millard moved to Pasadena after George's retirement in 1913. The couple converted a bungalow on Huntington Drive in South Pasadena into a book salon. When George died in 1918, Alice carried on with their book-buying business, along with antique furniture. She commissioned Frank Lloyd Wright. According to Ritchie, "Wright was not interested in doing a traditional house on the traditional flat lot in a respective neighborhood which Alice had already purchased. He searched the area and found a tree-covered ravine leading into the Arroyo which he persuaded Alice to buy. He snugly fit the house therein."

Alice Millard was described as “one of the most important American booksellers of the 20th century, advising, teaching, and influencing such affluent disciples as William Andrews Clark, Templeton Crocker, Caroline Boeing Poole, and Estelle Doheny."

She died in 1938. Much of the Millards’ collection of books was given to the Huntington Library.

== See also ==
- Artists of the Arroyo Seco (Los Angeles)
