= Meryle Secrest =

American biographer

Meryle Secrest is an American biographer, primarily of American artists and art collectors.

== Biography ==
Secrest was born in Bath, England, and educated at the City of Bath Girls School, a city-run grammar school strong in the arts and Humanities. Her family emigrated to Canada, where she began her career as a journalist. She worked as women's editor for the Hamilton News in Ontario, Canada; shortly thereafter she was named "Most Promising Young Writer" by the Canadian Women's Press Club. After marrying an American in 1964, she began writing for The Washington Post, doing profile interviews of notable personalities from Leonard Bernstein to Anaïs Nin.

In 1975, she left the Post to write books full-time. Since then she has written a number of biographies; her subjects have included Frank Lloyd Wright, Lord Duveen, Stephen Sondheim, Leonard Bernstein, Salvador Dalí, Kenneth Clark, Bernard Berenson, Romaine Brooks, Richard Rodgers, and Amedeo Modigliani. Her autobiography is entitled Shoot the Widow.

In 2014 Secrest published Elsa Schiaparelli: A Biography which examined Schiaparelli's childhood, her stratospheric rise in the world of Parisian design, and her collaborations with the Surrealists, Jean Cocteau, and Dali.

She lives in Washington, D.C.

== Awards and recognition ==
Secrest's Being Bernard Berenson was a finalist for the Pulitzer Prize in 1980 and for the American Book Awards in 1981. In 1999, she received the George Freedley Memorial Award of the American Library Association for her outstanding contribution to the literature of the theatre. In 2006, she received the Presidential National Humanities Medal from President George W. Bush at the White House for illuminating the lives of great architects, artists and scholars of the 20th century.

== Books ==
- Between Me and Life: A Biography of Romaine Brooks, 1974. OCLC 969614
- Being Bernard Berenson, 1979. OCLC 4549289
- Kenneth Clark: A Biography, 1984. OCLC 11113241
- Salvador Dalí, 1986.
- Frank Lloyd Wright: A Biography, 1992. OCLC 26613089
- Leonard Bernstein: A Life, 1994.
- Stephen Sondheim: A Life, 1998.
- Somewhere for Me: A Biography of Richard Rodgers, 2001. OCLC 849259450
- Duveen: A Life in Art, 2004.
- Shoot the Widow: Adventures of a Biographer in Search of Her Subject, 2007
- Modigliani: A Life, 2011
- Elsa Schiaparelli, 2014
- The Mysterious Affair at Olivetti: IBM, the CIA, and the Cold War Conspiracy to Shut Down Production of the World's First Desktop Computer, 2019
- Princess Margaret and the Curse: An Inquiry Into a Royal Life, 2025
