= Imperial Hotel, Tokyo =

Hotel in Uchisaiwaicho, Chiyoda ward, Tokyo

Coordinates: 35.67231°N 139.75822°E

Imperial Hotel

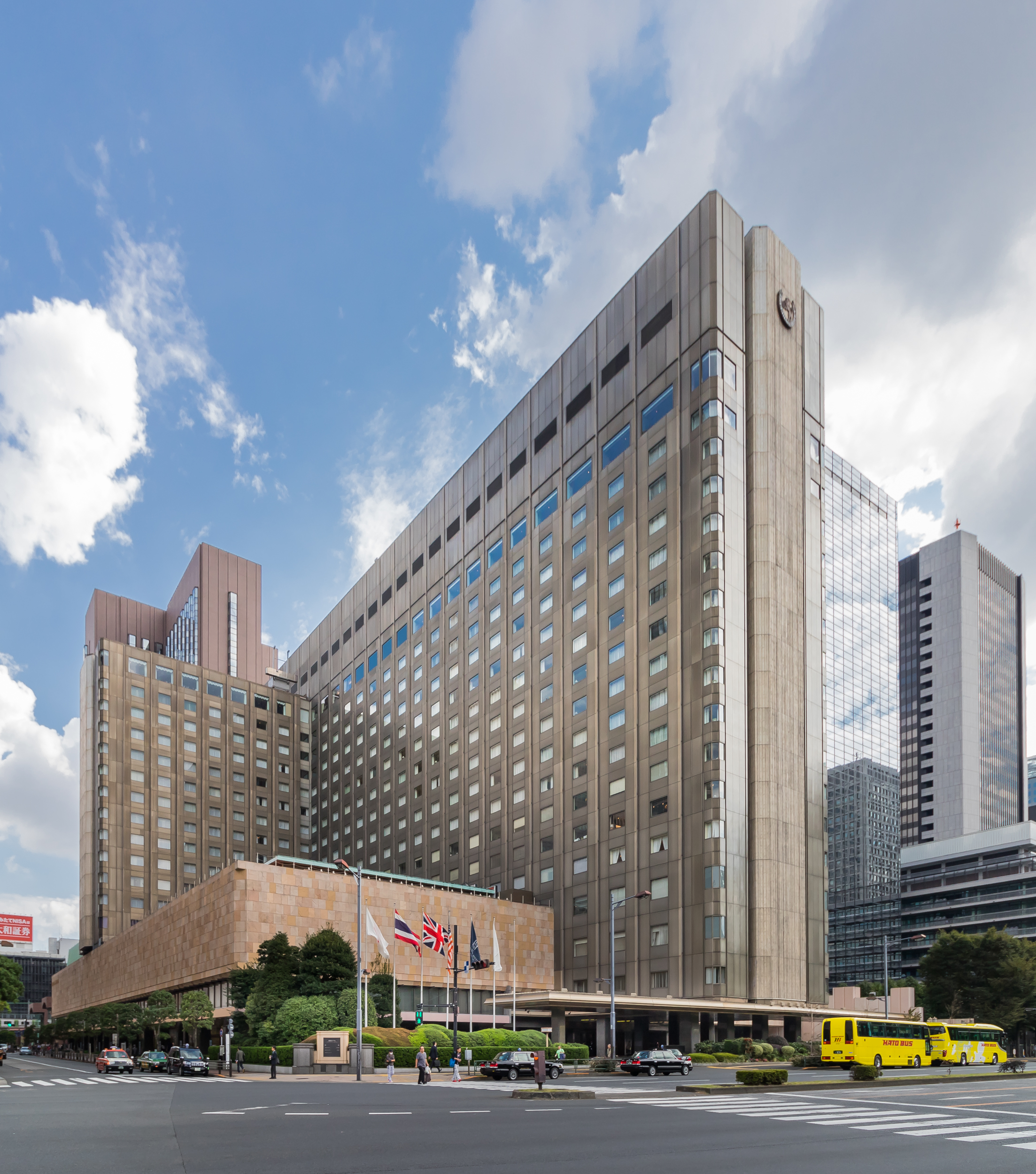
- The Imperial Hotel in Tokyo in 2012
- Interactive map of the Imperial Hotel area

General information
- Location: 1-1, Uchisaiwai-cho 1-chome, Chiyoda-ku, Tokyo 100-8558, Japan
- Operator: Imperial Hotel, Ltd.

Website
- www.imperialhotel.co.jp

The Imperial Hotel (帝国ホテル, teikoku hoteru) is a hotel in Uchisaiwaicho, Chiyoda ward, Tokyo. It was created in the late 1880s at the request of the Japanese aristocracy to cater to the increasing number of Western visitors to Japan. The hotel site is located just south of the Imperial Palace grounds, next to the previous location of the Palace moat. The modern hotel overlooks the Palace, the 40-acre (16 ha) Hibiya Park, and the Yurakucho and Ginza neighborhoods.

In a reference to the three Edo era branch houses of the Tokugawa clan, the Imperial Hotel, Hotel Okura Tokyo, and Hotel New Otani Tokyo are often referred to as one of the three great hotels (御三家, gosanke) of Tokyo.

== History ==
Three main buildings have stood on the hotel site, each of which embodied the finest Western design of its era. Including annexes, at least 10 structures have been part of the Imperial Hotel, including two designed by Frank Lloyd Wright:

- The original Imperial Hotel, designed by Yuzuru Watanabe (1890–1922)
- Hotel Metropole in Tsukiji, purchased as an annex (1906–1910)
- First Imperial Hotel annex (1906–1919)
- A temporary annex, designed by Frank Lloyd Wright when the original hotel annex burnt (1920–1923)
- New Imperial Hotel main building, designed by Frank Lloyd Wright (1922–1967)
- 1954 Imperial Hotel annex (1954–1979)
- 1958 Imperial Hotel annex (1958–1979)
- Imperial Hotel parking structure (1969–present)
- Third (and current) main building, which replaced the Frank Lloyd Wright main building (1970–present)
- Imperial Hotel Tower Building, which replaced the 1954 and 1958 annexes (1983–2024)

=== First Imperial Hotel: 1890–1922 ===
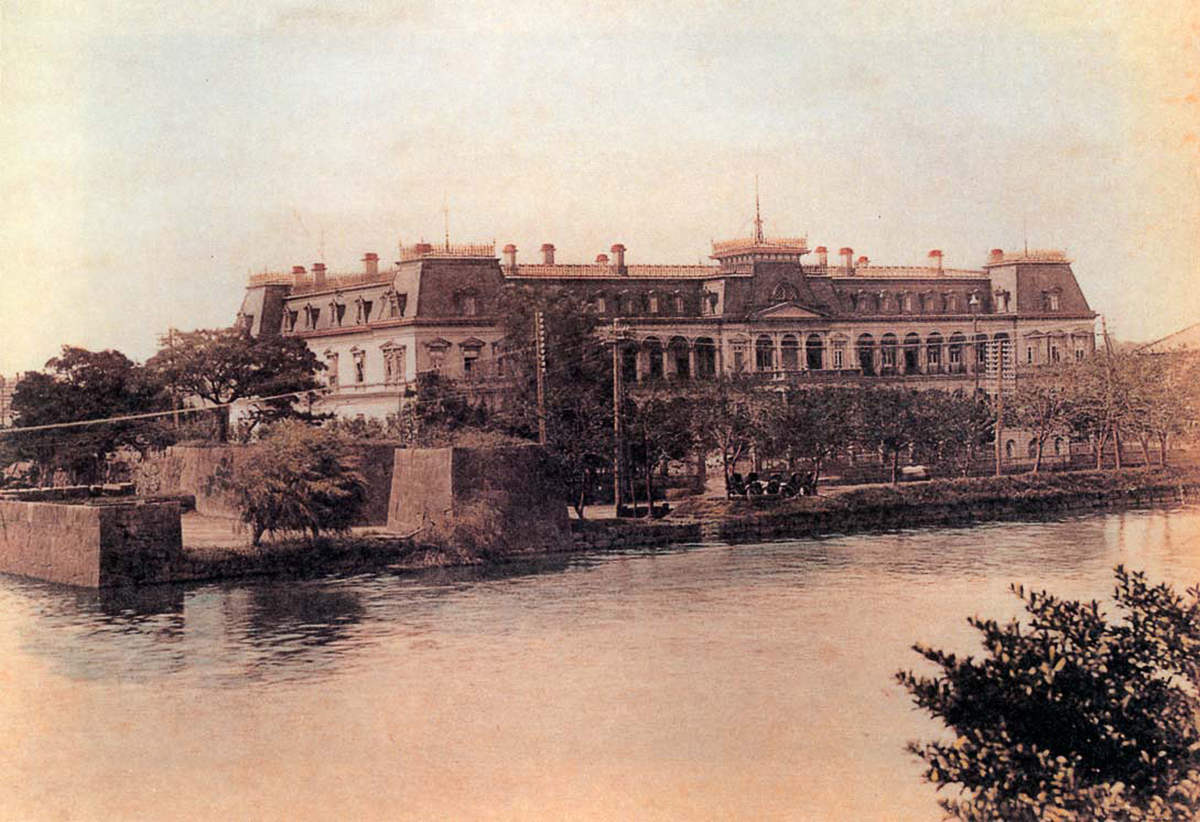
The original Imperial Hotel, designed by Yuzuru Watanabe (1890)

The original Imperial Hotel opened in November 1890 on the northeast corner of what is now the hotel property. The hotel faced roughly north, with parts of the Imperial Palace moats (no longer extant) across streets on the north and east sides of the building.

The hotel was backed by key Japanese leaders, such as Foreign Minister Count Inoue Kaoru and Viscount Shibusawa Eiichi. Shibusawa and Okura Kihachiro submitted an application to form the Tokyo Hotel Co. on 28 November 1887, in order to "build a large hotel in Tokyo and to conduct the business of renting rooms to foreign guests, and for parties and other events...". There were initially 21 investors, with the largest (21.15%) being the Imperial Household Ministry. Site preparation for the hotel started in July 1888, and construction began in the fall of that year. On 7 July 1890 the name was changed to Imperial Hotel Ltd. The hotel was opened in November 1890.

Plans for the hotel were part of the effort to centralize government offices in the Hibiya area. A group of German architects visited Japan and made some preliminary drawings. The initial drawings for the hotel were created by Heinrich Mänz, in the German neo-Renaissance style. In 1886, a group of 20 Japanese were sent to Germany for training. Eventually, Yuzuru Watanabe would be picked to design the 60-room hotel, which would also be known as "Watanabe House". Watanabe used the original layout by Mänz, but because of soil conditions, changed the four story stone structure to a three-story wood frame and brick structure, with the exterior painted to look like stone. He also added rooms under the eaves to accommodate more guests. Western (French) food had been the official banquet fare of the Imperial Palace since Emperor Meiji hosted a luncheon for the nephew of the king of Italy on 8 September 1873, and the Imperial Hotel followed that tradition.

Japan's first Diet building, just finished on 24 November 1890 in time for the first Diet session, burned down on 20 January 1891. After a week of preparations, the House of Peers reconvened in the ballroom of the Imperial Hotel, where they met until 1 March.

Business was slow at first, and the hotel lost money. Even after the U.S. annexed the Philippines in 1902, bringing more travelers through Japan, the hotel only averaged 40 guests and 50 restaurant customers. It was not until the start of the Russo-Japanese War in 1904 that the hotel was regularly filled to capacity. In 1906 a 42-room annex was built and the Hotel Metropole in Tsukiji was purchased to increase capacity, allowing the hotel to serve up to 150 resident guests and seat up to 200 for dinner and banquets. The Metropole was torn down in 1910, as planning began for a new building to be completed by 1916.

Watanabe's Imperial Hotel building was destroyed by fire on 16 April 1922, while Edward, Prince of Wales was visiting Japan. The fire broke out during the day, with a full staff on hand and most of the guests out at an Imperial garden party. There were no deaths, but business at the hotel stopped until the south wing of the new hotel could be opened.

=== Second Imperial Hotel: 1923–1968 ===
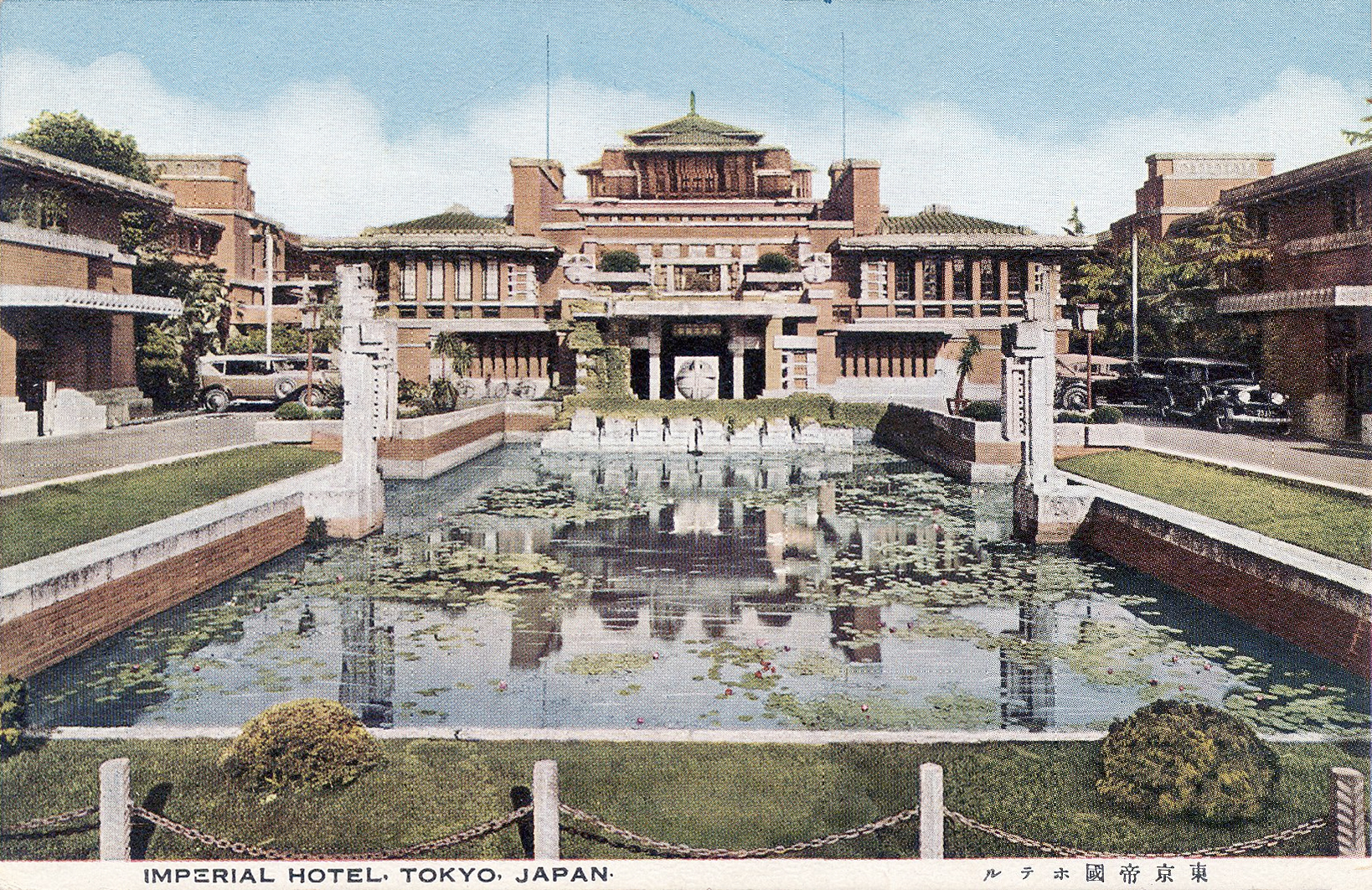
The entrance courtyard of Wright's Imperial Hotel designed in the Mayan Revival Style

The second Imperial Hotel was built from 1919 to 1923, and officially opened on 1 September 1923. This hotel was the best-known of Frank Lloyd Wright's buildings in Japan. It was designed roughly in the shape of its own logo, with the guest room wings forming the letter "H", while the public rooms were in a smaller but taller central wing shaped like the letter "I" that cut through the middle of the "H".

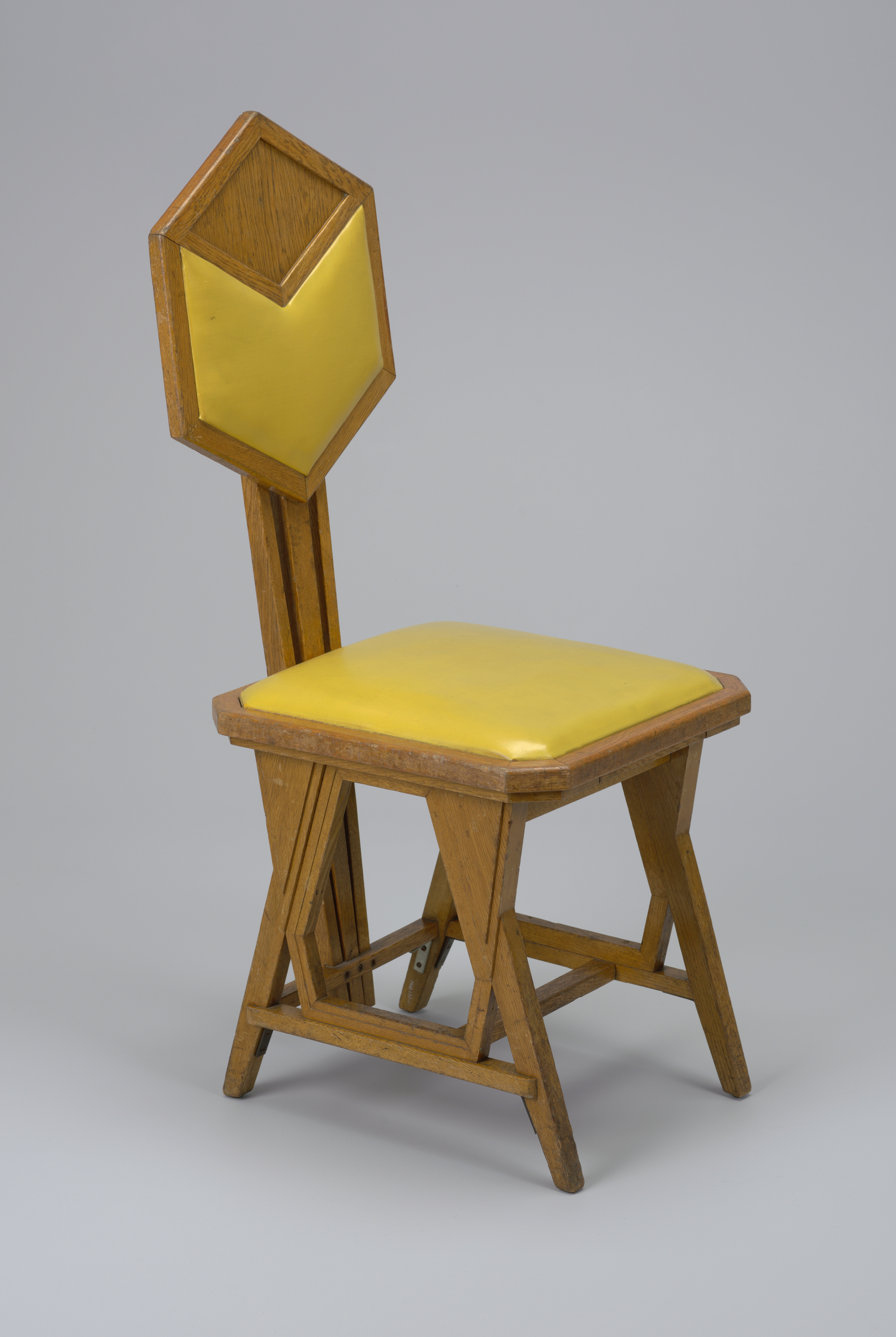
Peacock Chair, designed for the hotel

==== Preliminaries ====
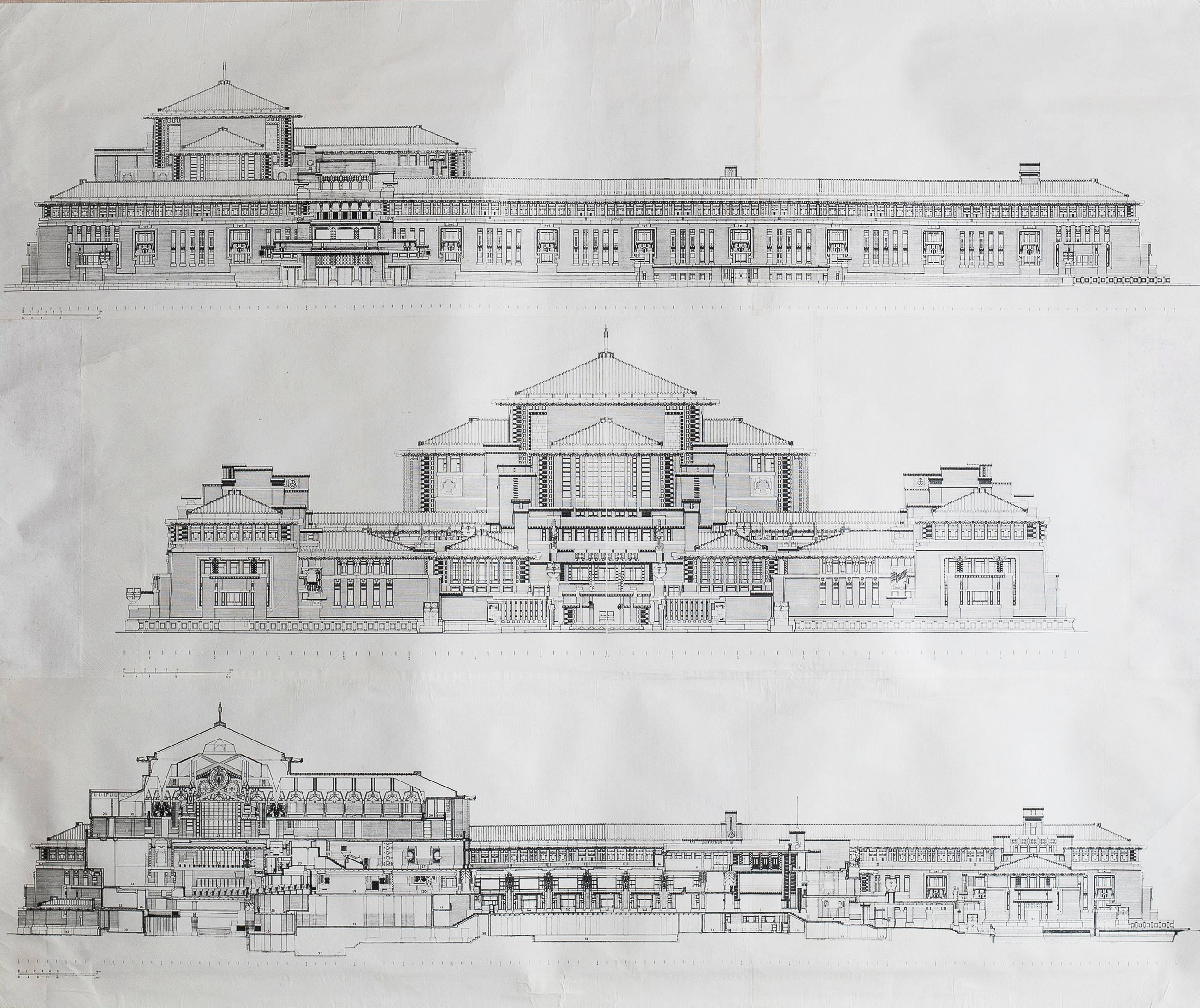
Imperial Hotel Tokyo plans design by Wright

In 1911, Wright was recommended to Aisaku Hayashi of the Imperial Hotel by Frederick W. Gookin, a fellow collector of Japanese art. By 1912, Wright was corresponding directly with Hayashi, but the death of Emperor Meiji put a hold on discussions. When discussions resumed, Wright traveled to Japan, leaving the United States on 11 January 1913. During his stay, Wright examined the site and drew some preliminary plans. He returned to the United States in May confident that he would get the commission. In early 1916, Hayashi, his wife, and Japanese architect Tori Yoshitake traveled to the United States, arriving at Taliesin in February. In addition to going over plan details before submitting them to the Hotel Board of Directors for final approval, the trip seems to have been made for Hayashi to see some of Wright's work in person, and to see how American hotels were run. Hayashi and his companions were back in Japan by mid-April, and the board had approved the plans in time for Wright to sail for Japan on 28 December 1916.

The purpose of the 1917 visit (Wright arrived on 9 January and left on 21 April) was to prepare for construction—examine the site more thoroughly, make arrangements for materials, and hire draftsmen to make the working drawings. Wright was back at Taliesin by mid-May. Initial working drawings were all done at Taliesin, and Wright did not return to Japan until 17 November 1918 to supervise the start of construction.

==== Construction ====
In late 1919, when work had just begun on the new hotel, the 1906 Imperial Hotel annex burned to the ground. Work on the new hotel was stopped while Wright designed a temporary annex, which was opened five months later.

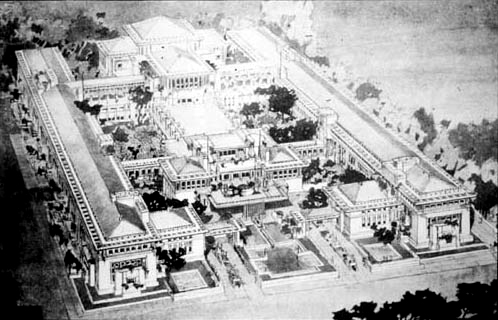
Final perspective drawing by Wright. Over 700 drawings were created for this project.

On 26 April 1922, the worst earthquake in decades (6.8 Richter) struck Tokyo. While many buildings in the area were destroyed and the remains of the first Imperial Hotel were toppled, the hotel itself—while shaken—stood completely undamaged. Wright was working on the upper floor of the building at the time, and he feared that the building would collapse when he heard a huge crash, but this turned out to just be the five chimneys from the first Imperial Hotel, which had burnt down 10 days earlier.

The north wing of the new hotel and a partially completed center section opened on 2 July 1922, in time to host the reunion of the United States Naval Academy class of 1881. At this point, estimates were that it would only take about six weeks to complete the hotel, and since the south wing was a mirror image of the north, Wright decided that he could leave the completion to be supervised by Arata Endo. Wright left Japan on 22 July 1922, never to return. The hotel took another 11 months to complete, and officially opened in June 1923.

The Frank Lloyd Wright annex (one of six Wright designs for Japan that was actually built) was destroyed in the Great Kantō earthquake on 1 September 1923, although by that time it was no longer in use.

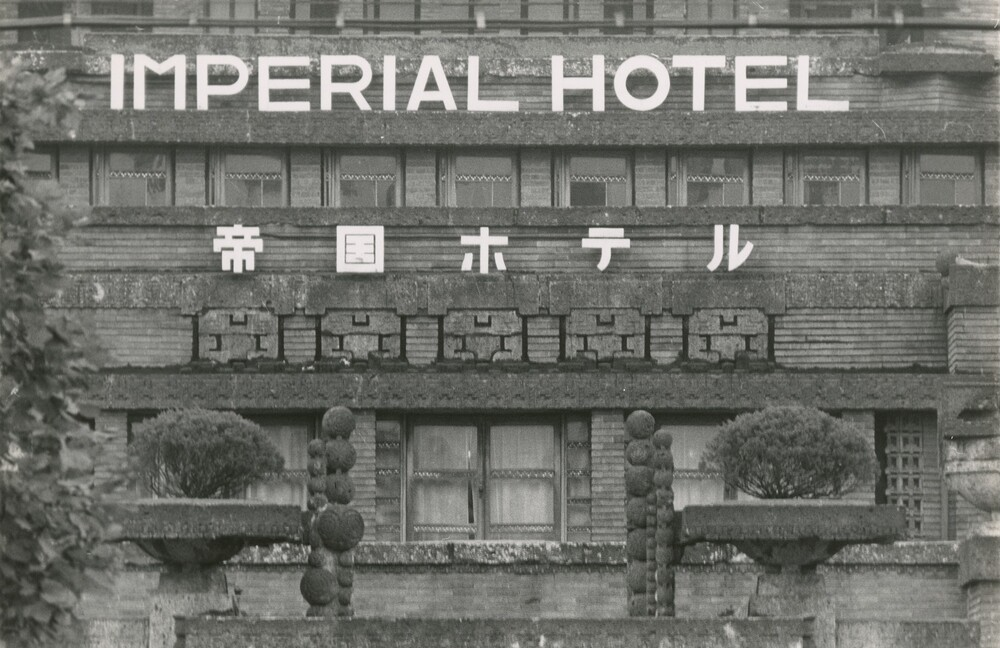
Imperial Hotel Sign

==== Architecture ====
The Frank Lloyd Wright version was designed in the Mayan Revival style of architecture. It incorporated a tall, pyramid-like structure, and also loosely copied Mayan motifs in its decorations. The main building materials were poured concrete, concrete block, and carved oya stone. The visual effect of the hotel was stunning and dramatic, though not entirely unique; it bears similarities to the Cafe Australia in Melbourne (1916), designed by Prairie School architects and former Wright associates Marion Mahony and Walter Burley Griffin.

Other architectural similarities are found in the Park Inn Hotel of Mason City, Iowa. The latter which was designed by Wright in 1909, is considered to be a smaller prototype for the second Imperial Hotel. It continues to operate as the only Wright designed hotel remaining fully intact.

The architecture heavily influenced the style of the Kōshien Hotel, which was constructed by Wright's apprentice Arata Endo.

==== 1923 Great Tokyo earthquake ====
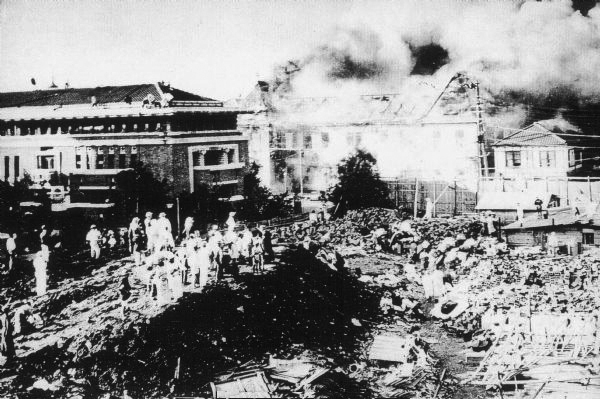
The hotel (left) shortly after the 1923 earthquake (on the right burning is the Kangyō Bank)

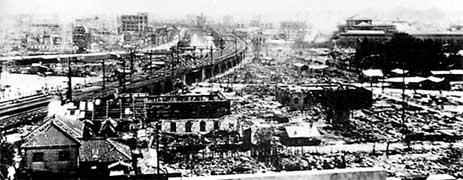
Shortly after the earthquake (the Imperial is seen in the top right)

The structure famously survived the Great Kantō earthquake on 1 September 1923 (7.9 on the Moment magnitude scale (M_{w})). A telegram from Baron Kihachiro Okura reported the following:

Hotel stands undamaged as a monument of your genius hundreds of homeless provided by perfectly maintained service congratulations[.] Congratulations[.]

Wright passed the telegram to journalists, helping to perpetuate a legend that the hotel was unaffected by the earthquake. In reality, the building had been damaged; the central section slumped, several floors bulged, four pieces of stonework fell to the ground, fans fell from the balcony, and electric ranges in the kitchen were toppled, starting a kitchen fire that was fairly quickly extinguished. It was also not the only building to survive, or the least damaged. On the insurance company damage scale (1–5), it was in the second best (light damage) category. According to the Tokyo Building Inspection Department, about 19% of the brick buildings and 20% of the steel and reinforced concrete buildings in the city were categorized in the best category (no damage) and thus performed better than the Imperial.

The building's main failing was its foundation. Wright had intended the hotel to float on the site's alluvial mud "as a battleship floats on water", even during an earthquake. This was accomplished by making it shallow, with broad footings. However, this proved an inadequate support and did not prevent the building from sinking into the mud to such an extent that it had to be demolished decades later. Furthermore, alluvial mud, such as that at the hotel's site, amplifies seismic waves.

However, the hotel had several design features that minimized potential earthquake damage:

- Interlocking timber beams within the foundation, which allowed the structure to sway, but not collapse;
- Seismic separation joints, located about every 20 m (66 ft) along the building;
- Tapered walls, thicker on lower floors, increasing their strength;
- Cantilevered floors and balconies provided extra support for the floors;
- Suspended piping and wiring, instead of being encased in concrete, as well as smooth curves, making them more resistant to fracture;
- A copper roof eliminated the risk of falling debris created by traditional tile roofs;
- The reflecting pool provided a source of water for fire-fighting, saving the building from the post-earthquake firestorm.

After the earthquake and subsequent fire, the Hotel temporarily hosted the American, British, French, and Italian embassies, as well as the Chinese and Swedish Ministers. The Grill Room, as well as some exterior space behind the hotel, was allocated to storage of relief supplies. The front entrance to the new South wing was given over for use by public utilities, and the press was given the banquet hall entrance and the promenade leading to the banquet hall. Until electric and water were restored, cooking was done outside, first on campfires, then on charcoal grills. For the first four days after the earthquake, the hotel fed all comers for free, up to 2,500 people twice daily. After that, the hotel charged only cost until the emergency was over. Electricity was restored to the hotel on 4 September, and water on 5 September. Relief supplies from other countries started arriving in Tokyo, and to the hotel, on 3 September with the arrival of the destroyer USS Stewart.

In 1930, the Kōshien Hotel was constructed under the plans of Arata Endo, a disciple of Wright. The design was inspired by the Imperial Hotel.

==== World War II ====
By 1936, Japan was preparing for the 1940 Summer Olympics in Tokyo, and there was serious talk of replacing Wright's Imperial Hotel with a building more suited to the needs of the time. With only 280 rooms, the hotel was no longer financially viable. World War II intervened to cancel the Olympics and save the hotel from the wrecking ball.

During World War II, the South wing of the hotel was gutted by incendiary bombs on 25 May 1945, and the Peacock room was destroyed. The hotel asked Wright to come back and design the repairs to the hotel, but Wright refused. The hotel was commandeered for a period by the Allied occupation forces and managed by the U.S. government, under the supervision of Lieutenant J. Malcolm Morris, from 1945 to 1952, and some of the damage was repaired during this time.

==== Postwar ====
As part of the land reform instituted by the occupying forces under General Douglas MacArthur, Okura Kishichiro and all of his family had to give up their shares in the Imperial Hotel. The same applied to the Imperial Household Agency, ending the financial involvement of the Imperial family in the hotel.

The hotel was returned to its owners on 1 April 1952, and full repairs could be made. As the guest wings of the Wright building were only three stories tall, it actually had relatively few guest rooms. Once the war damage had been repaired, a new annex was constructed directly behind the North wing of Wright's building, opening on 1 December 1954 and adding 200 guest rooms to the hotel. Construction for a second annex of 450 guest rooms started on 17 November 1956, with the annex opening in June 1958.

On 15 January 1956, a salesman for the hotel's jewelry shop was robbed by American professional wrestler John MacFarland and a Japanese accomplice. MacFarland was famous for his Japanese professional wrestling career, but was deeply in debt and desperate for money. The jewelry shop was known to arrange showings of expensive gems to wealthy customers; MacFarland arranged for a showing of diamonds, rubies, and sapphires in his room that morning at 10:20. He attacked the salesman, tied him up, and took his briefcase. He immediately left the hotel through the main lobby, but paused to sign autographs before departing. Police quickly realized that MacFarland, a recognizable 193-centimetre (76 in) tall Caucasian man with red hair, was the perpetrator. He was arrested without incident at Tokyo club later that night. None of the missing gemstones were ever recovered.

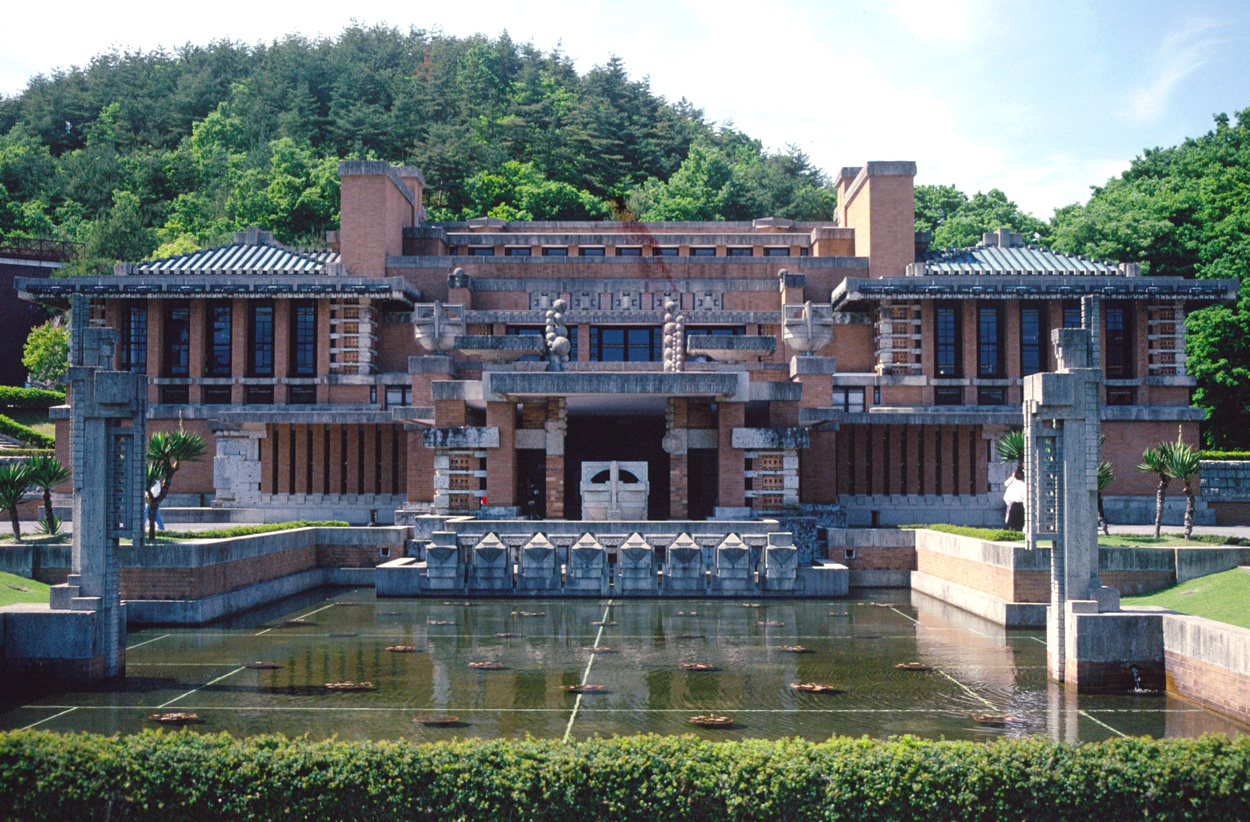
The entrance courtyard of Wright's Imperial Hotel, as recreated near Nagoya in the Meiji-Mura Museum

==== Demolition ====
The hotel eventually slipped into decay as time took its toll. In a controversial decision, it was decided in 1967 to demolish the old hotel and replace it with a high-rise structure. Reasons given for the demolition include the damage to the banquet section and South wing during World War II, uneven settling of the building on its floating foundation (some parts of the building had sunk as much as 1,100 mm (43 in)), and damage to the decorative oya stone that was causing pieces to fall off. The second Imperial Hotel was closed on 15 November 1967, and demolition started shortly after.

==== Surviving portion ====
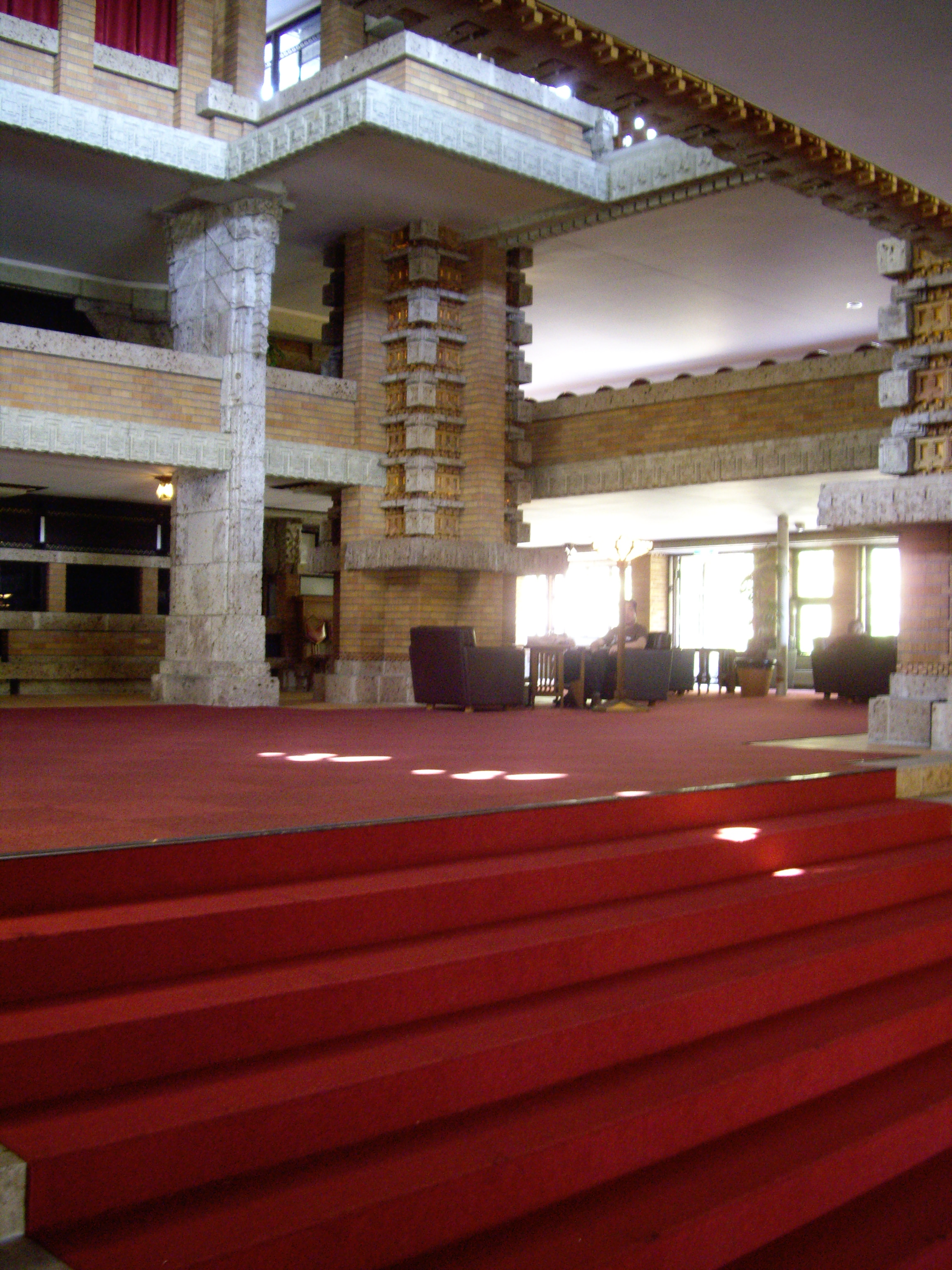
Entrance Hall, which was reconstructed in the Meiji Mura Museum

While most of Wright's building was destroyed, the iconic central lobby wing and the reflecting pool were disassembled and rebuilt at The Museum Meiji-mura, a collection of buildings (mostly from the Meiji Era) in Inuyama, near Nagoya, where they are open to the public.

Because the building structure was brick and concrete and could not be disassembled, as much of the oya stone as possible, tiles, and other finishing materials were preserved. Demolition of the hotel was completed and materials stored at Meiji-mura by March 1968. A site for the reconstruction was chosen in February 1970, and exterior reconstruction started in March, taking 6 years to complete. Interior reconstruction started in November 1983 after a 7-year pause, and was completed in October 1985, more than 17 years after the demolition.

==== Gallery ====
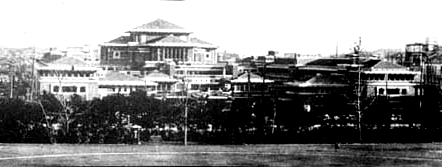
Full view from Hibiya Park

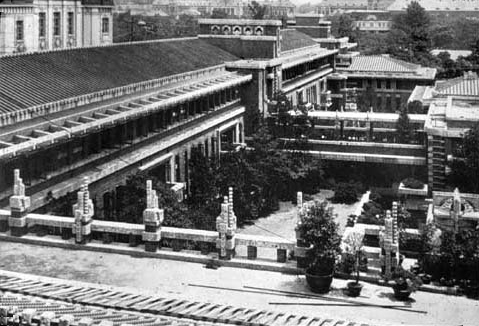
Connecting corridor (Lobby)

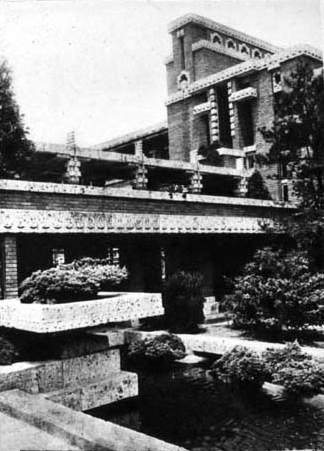
Connecting corridor (Lobby)

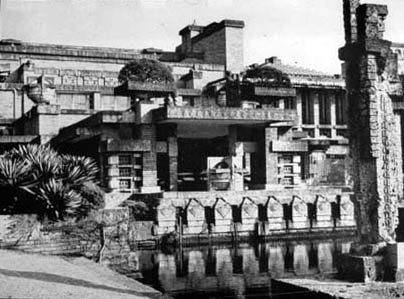
Entrance

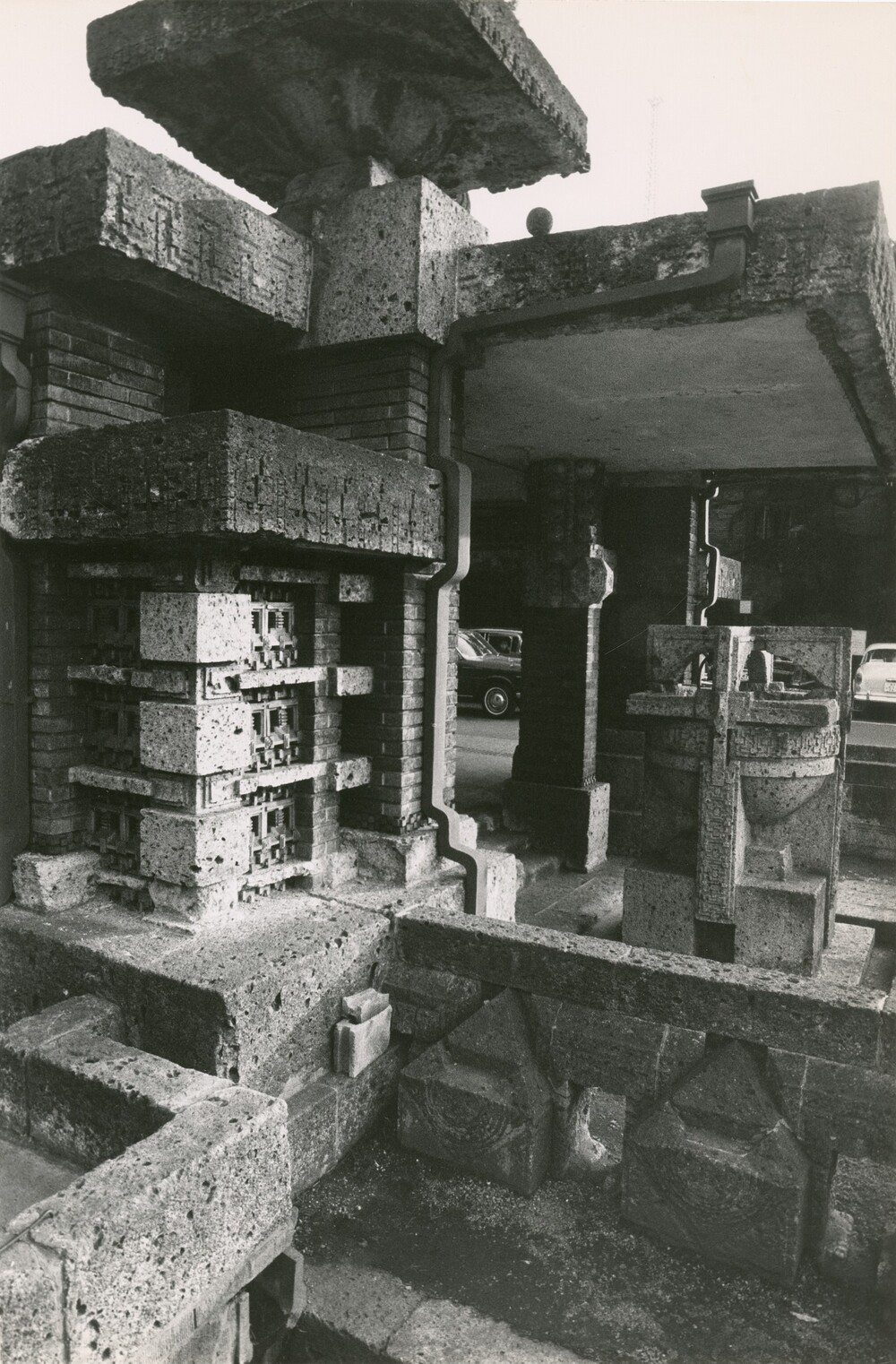
Imperial Hotel, Lobby Entrance

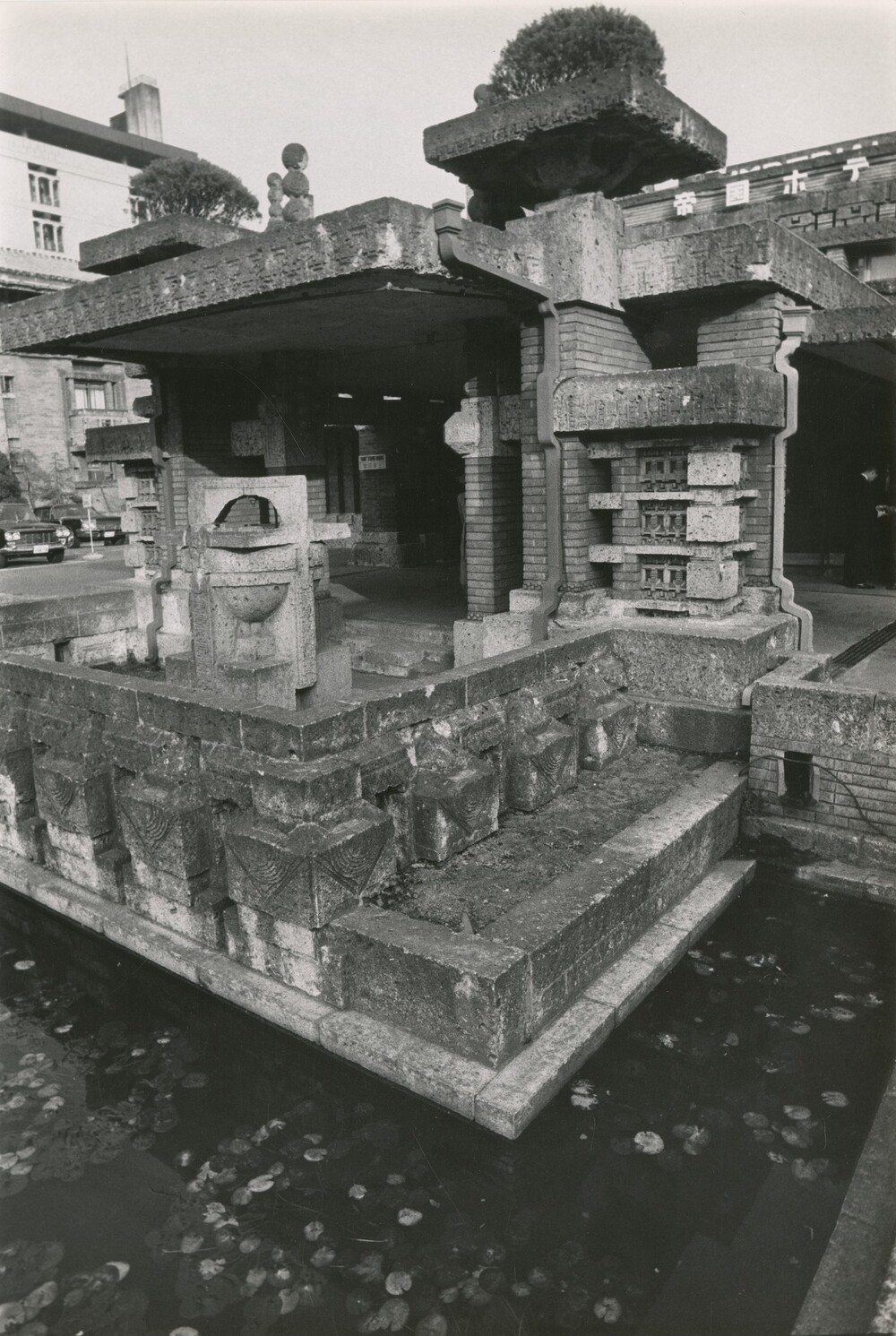
Lobby Entrance

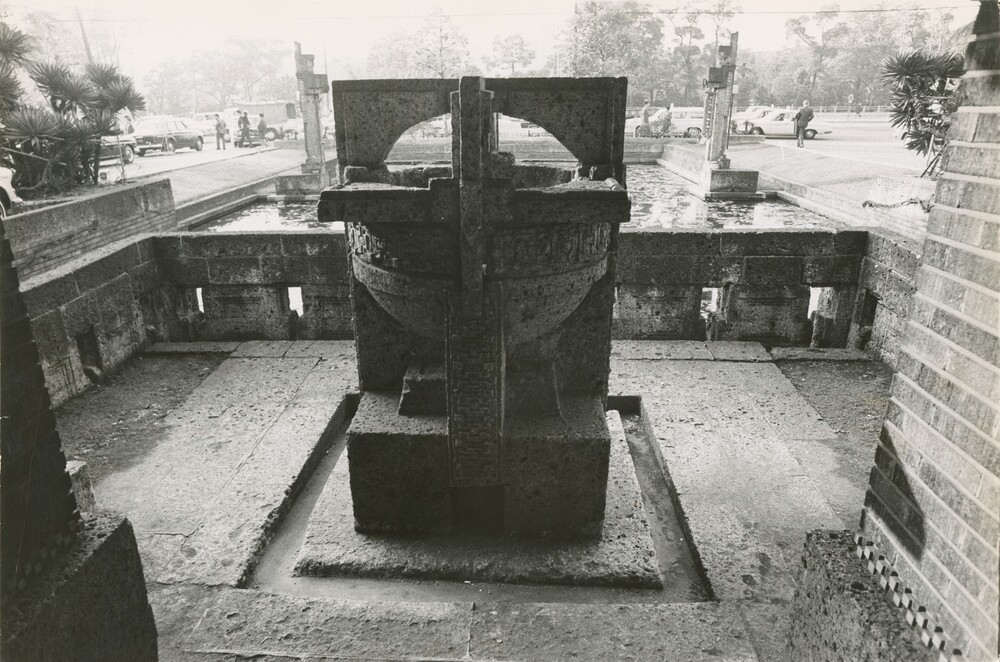
Stone urn viewed from Lobby Entrance

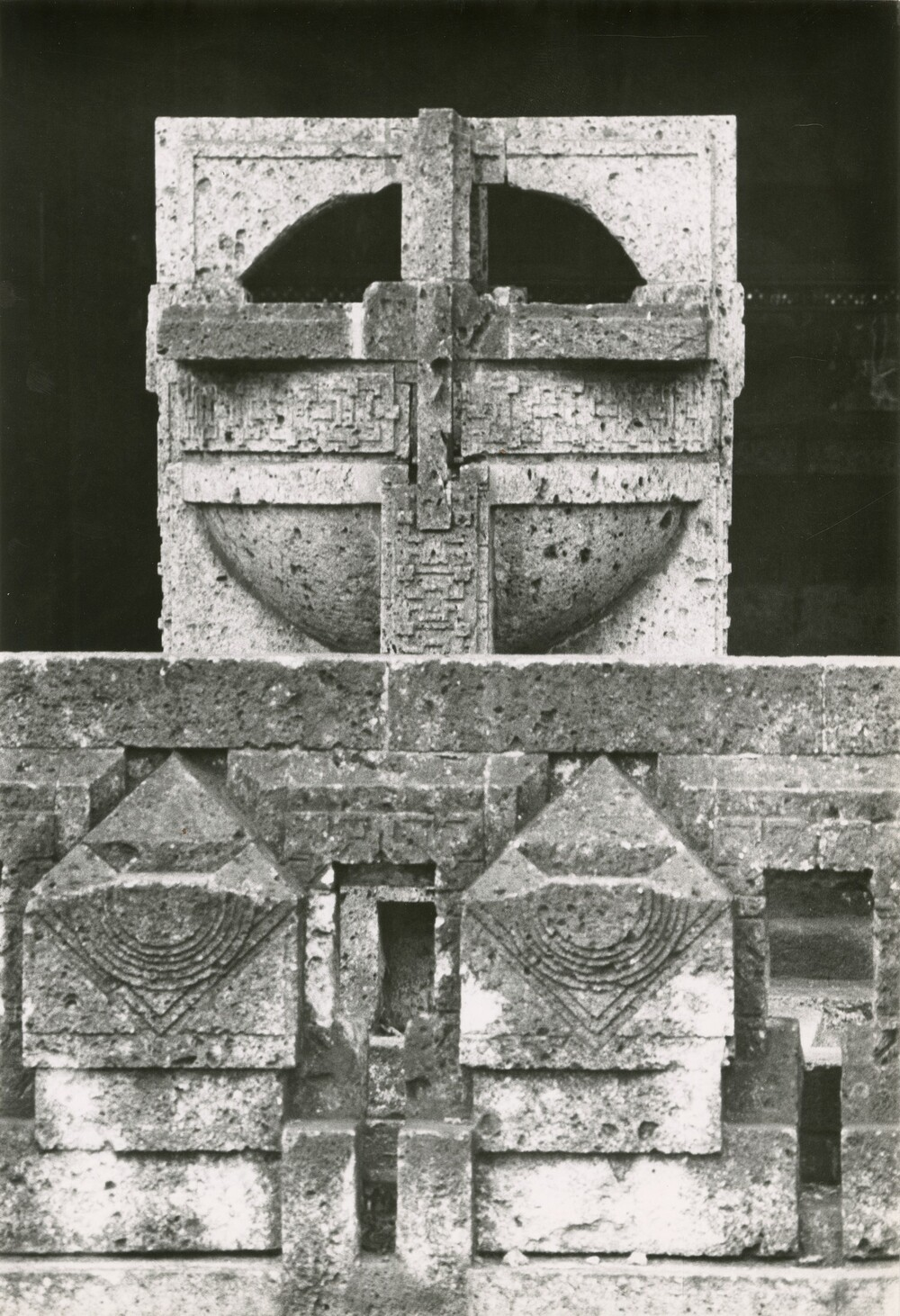
Stone urn at the Lobby Entrance

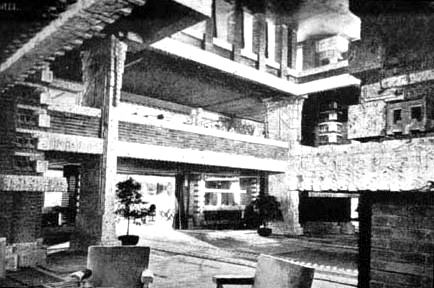
Entrance Hall

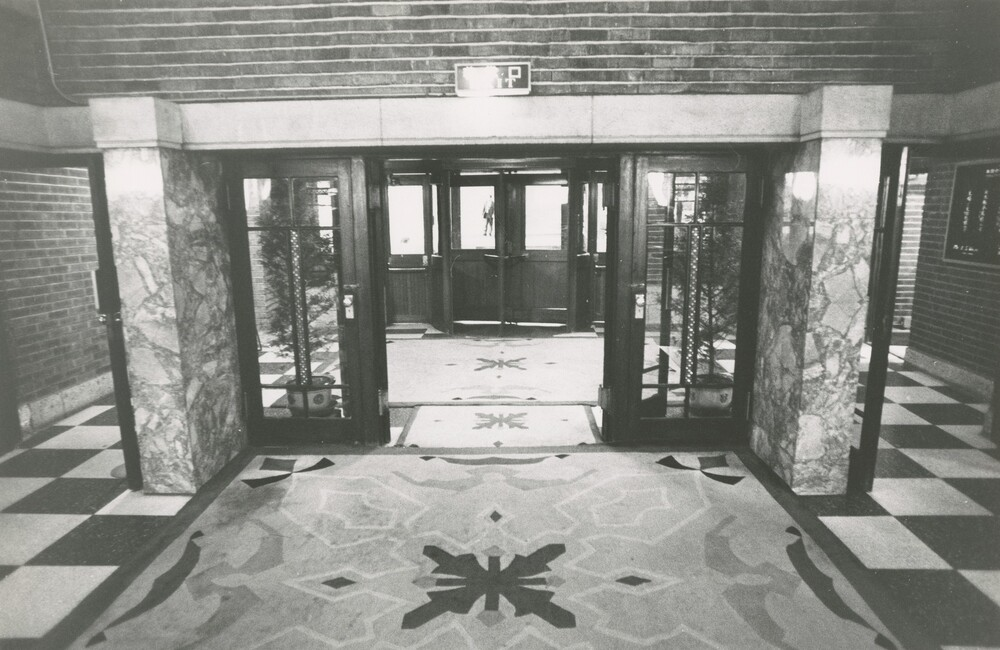
Interior Lobby Entrance

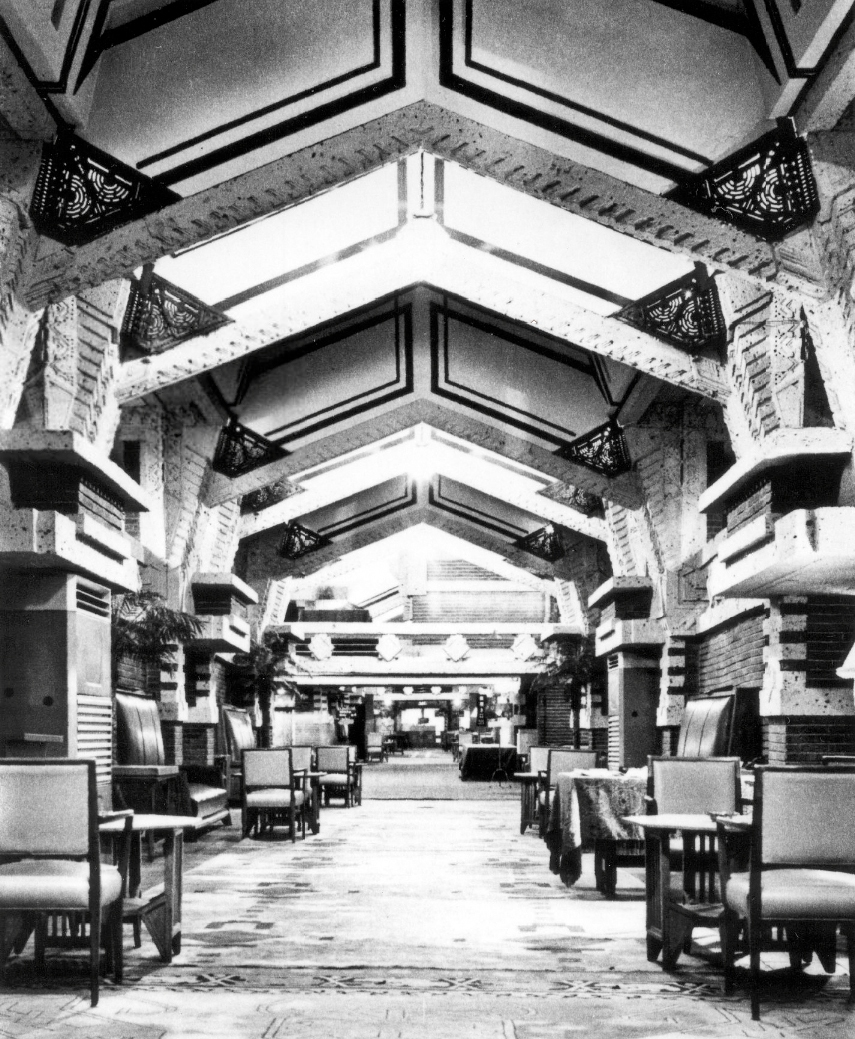
Inside Lobby

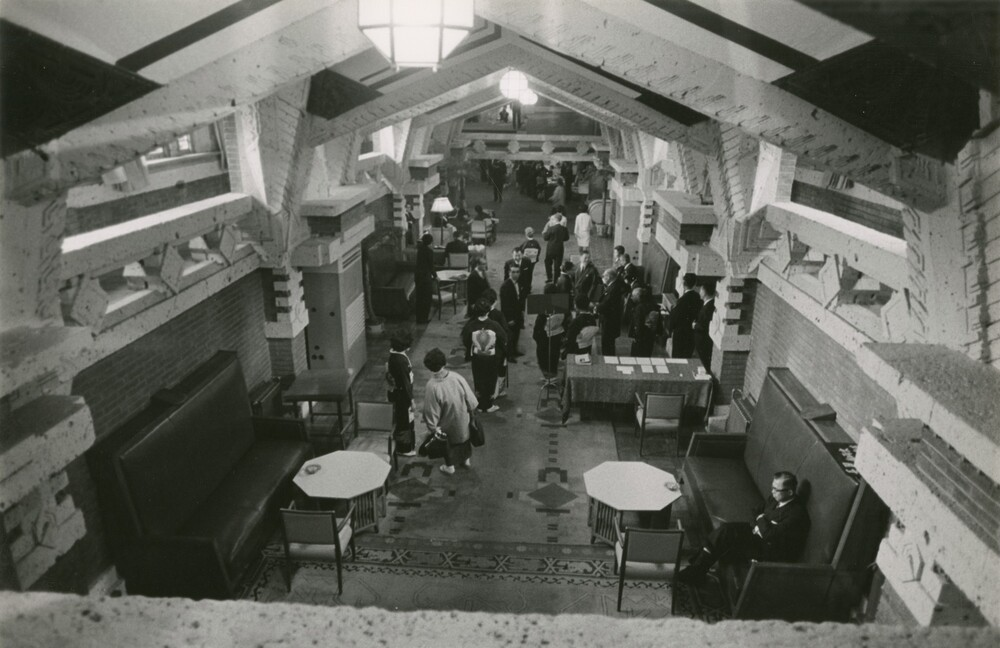
Overhead view of Hallway

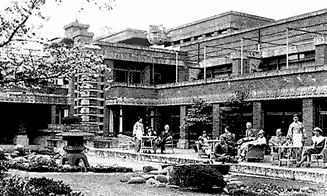
Terrace

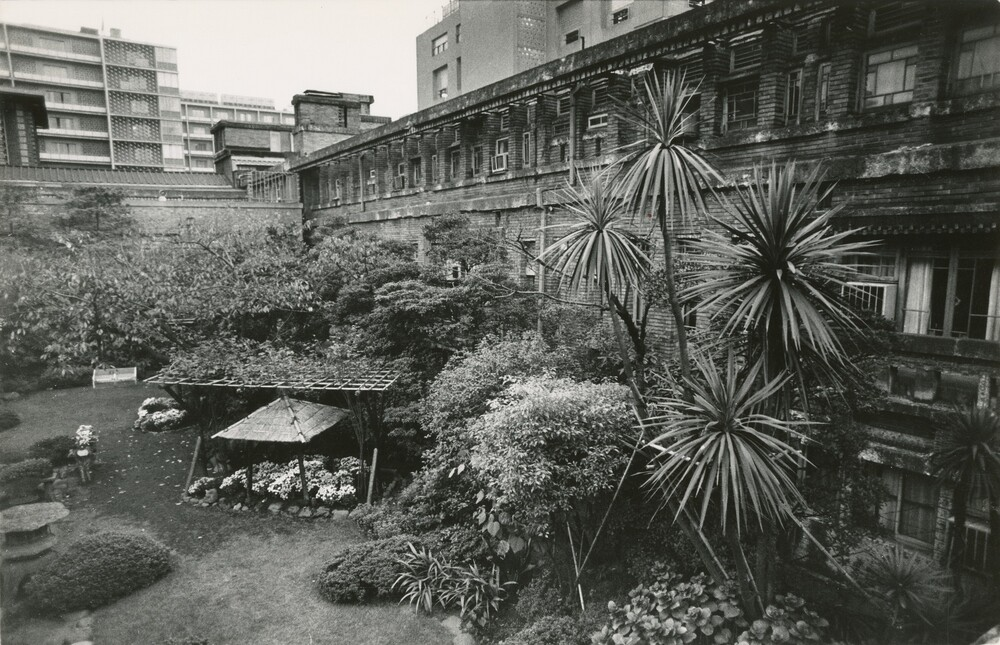
Inner Courtyard

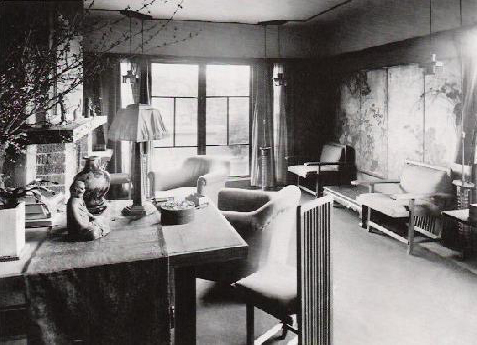
Guest room

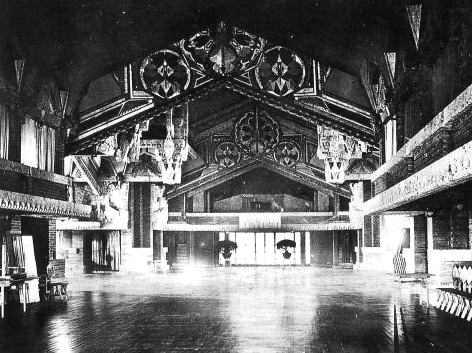
Peacock Room

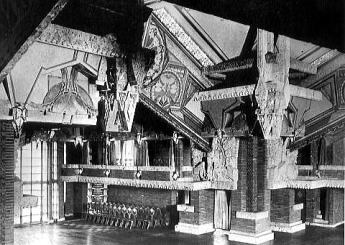
Peacock Room

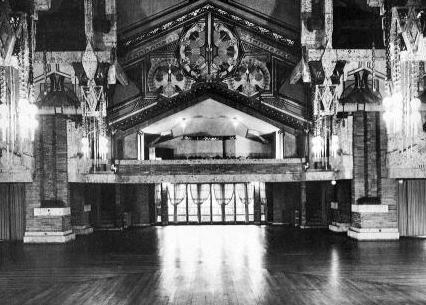
Peacock Room

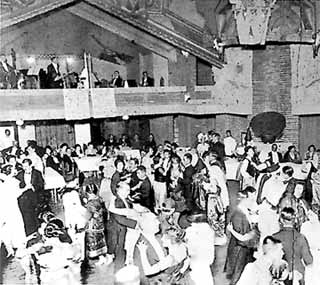
Peacock Room (1935)

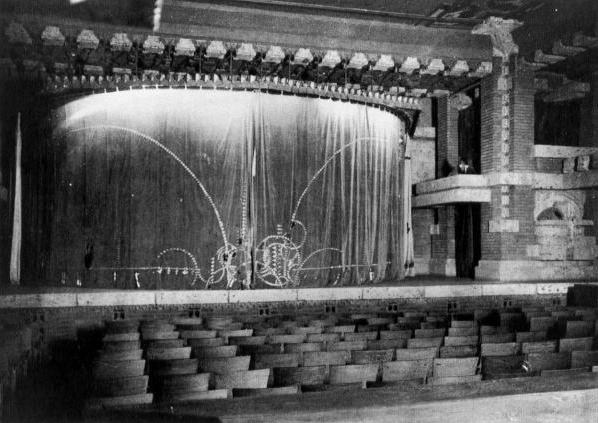
Theater

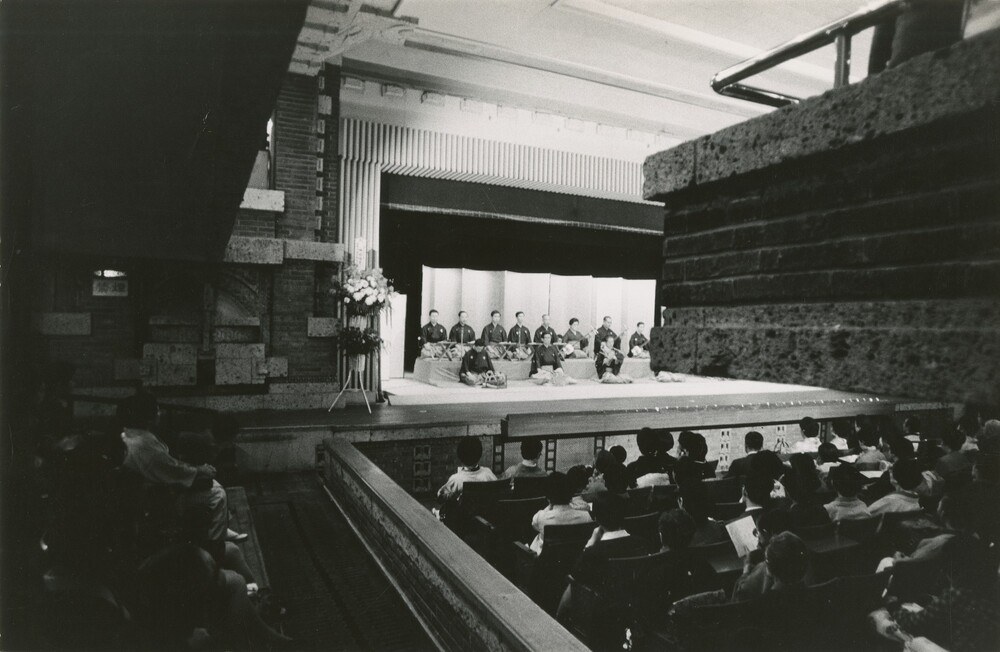
Theater During a Performance

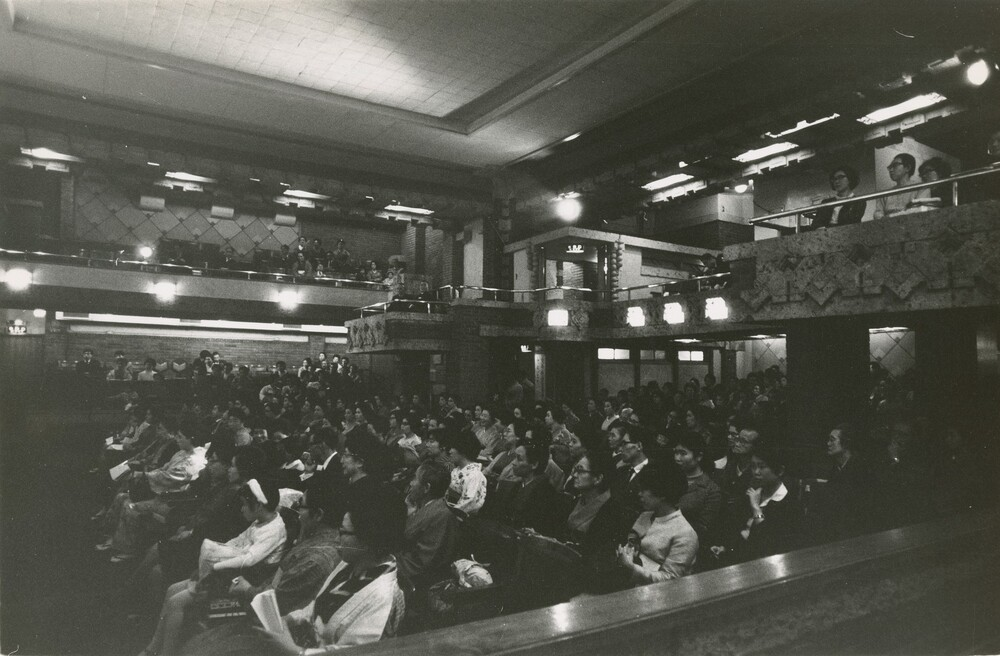
Theater and Audience

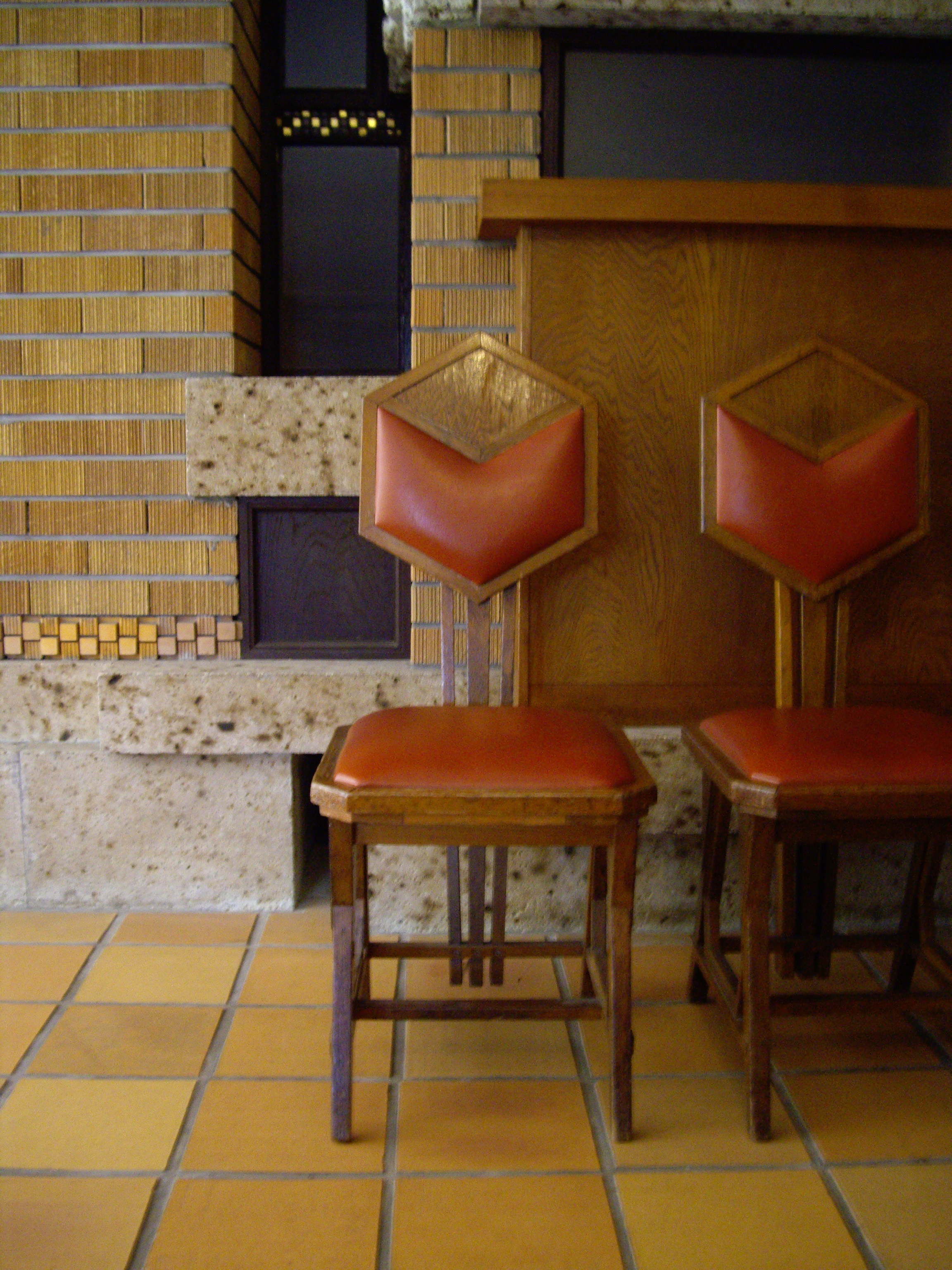
Original chairs by Wright, now in the Meiji Mura Museum

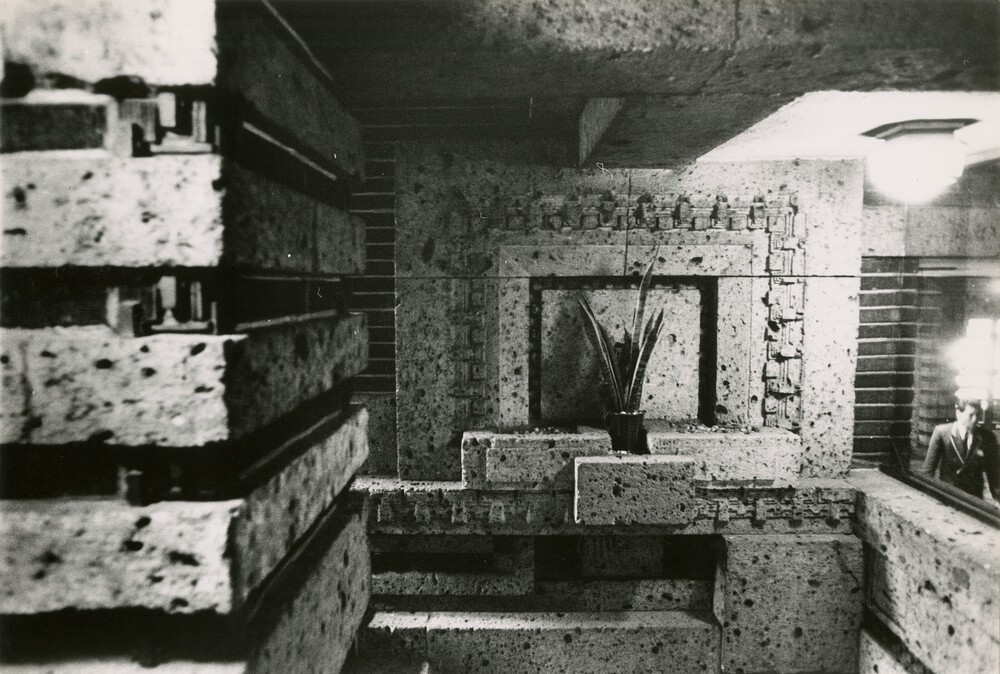
Detail of Interior Stonework

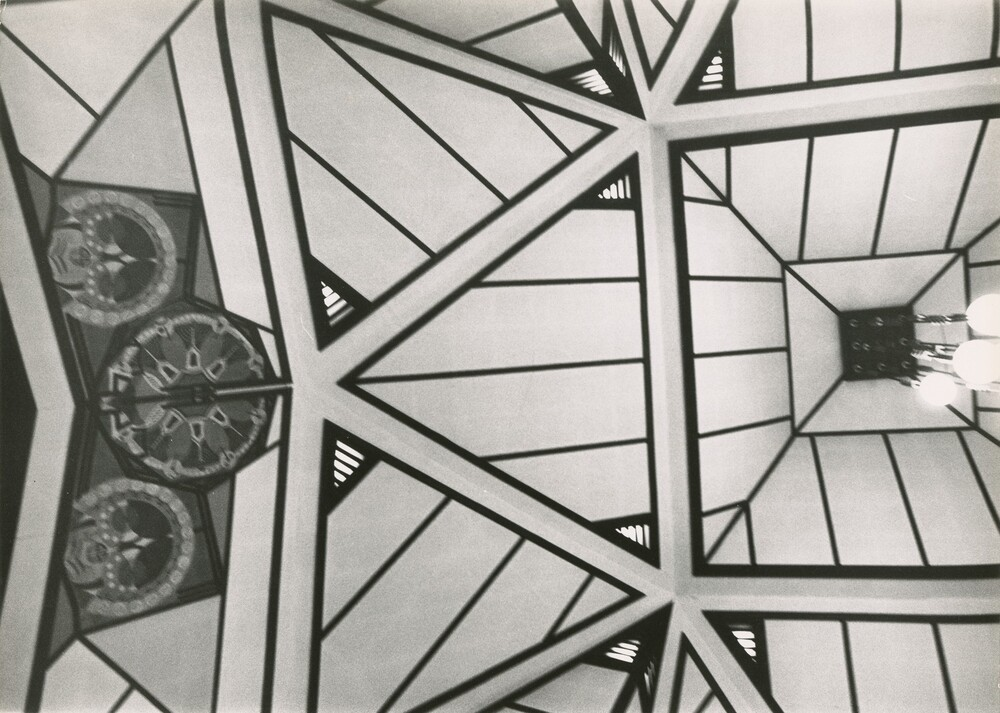
Ceiling of the Banquet Hall

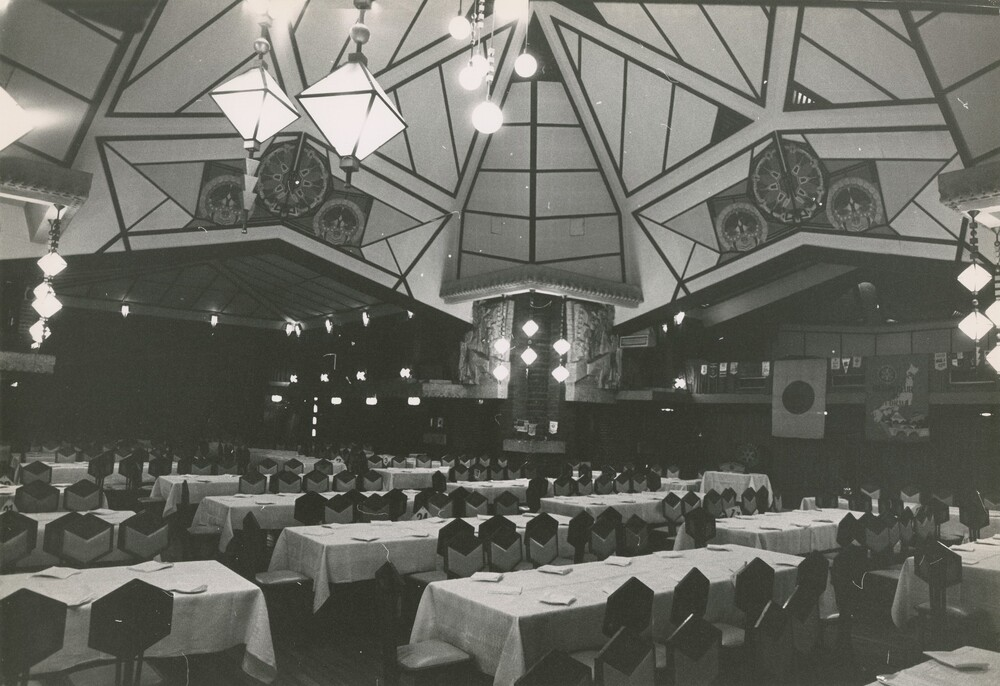
Banquet Hall

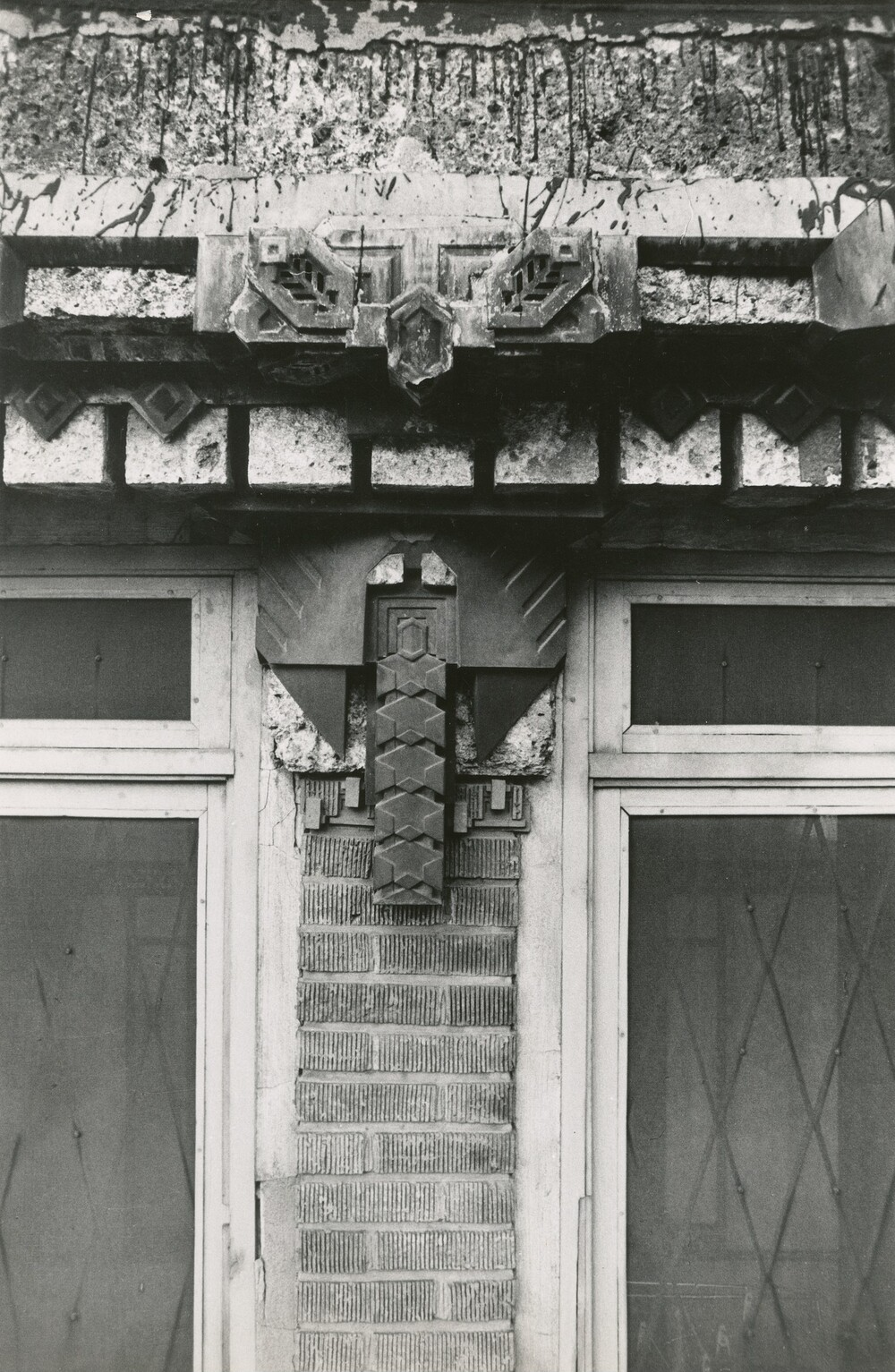
Detail of Exterior Stonework

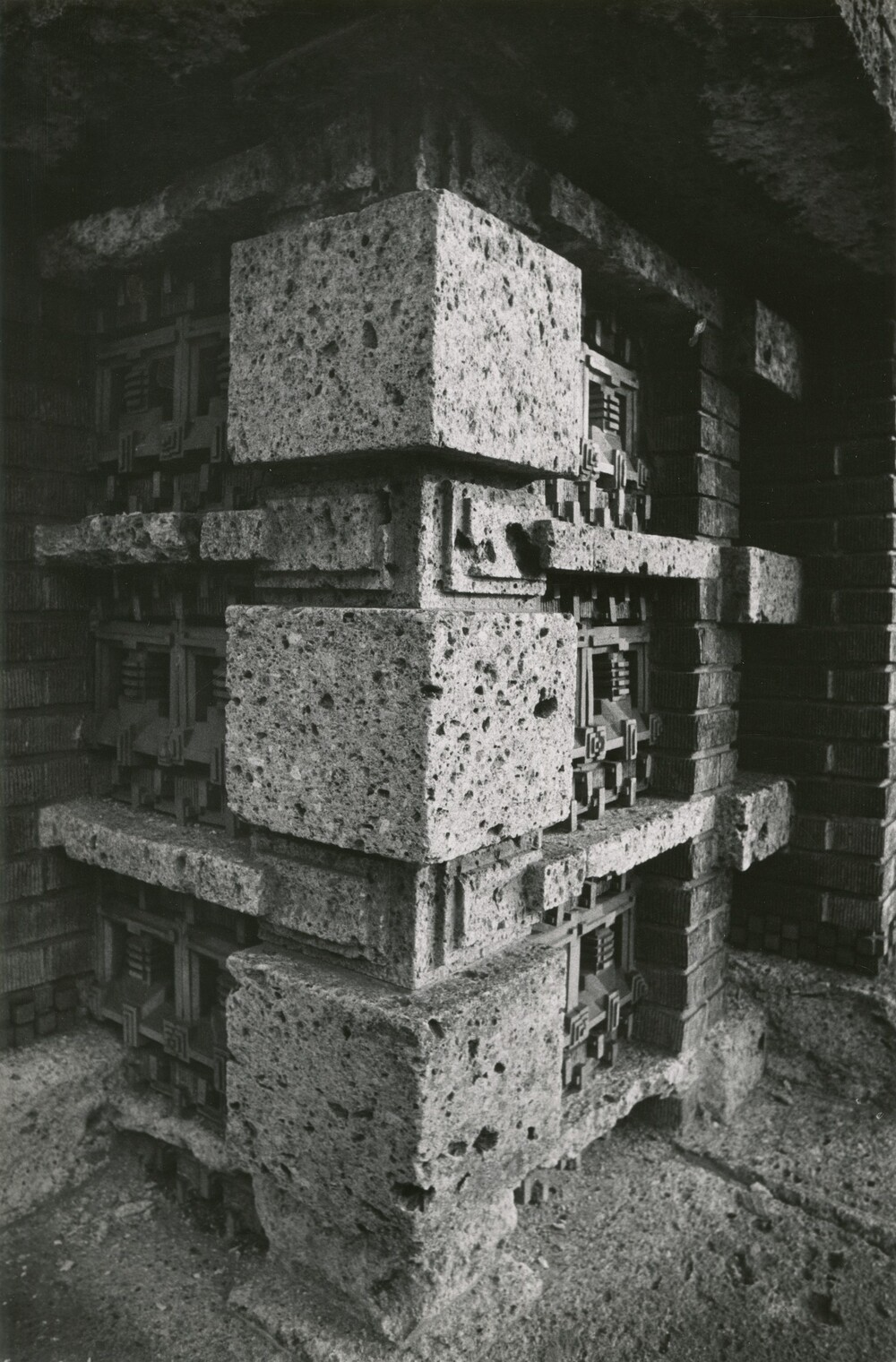
Stone Column

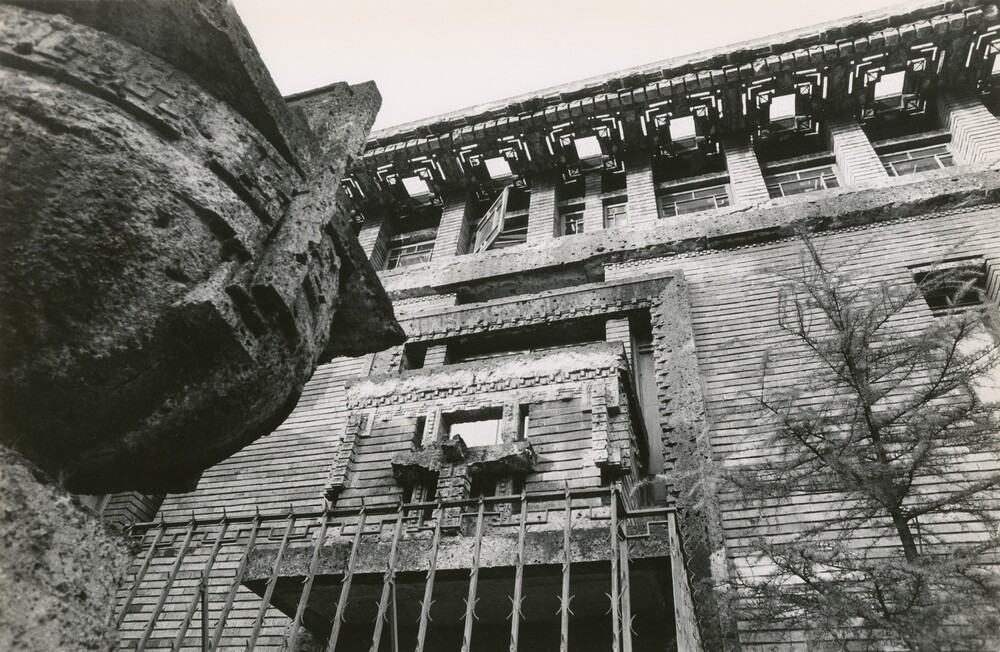
Wall and Stone Urn

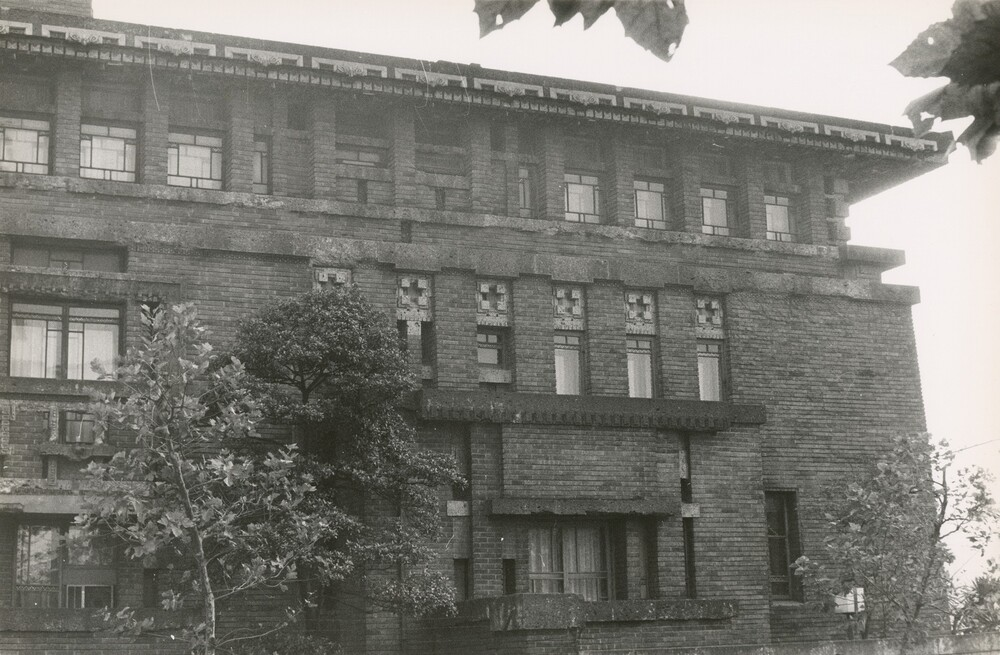
Exterior View of Wing

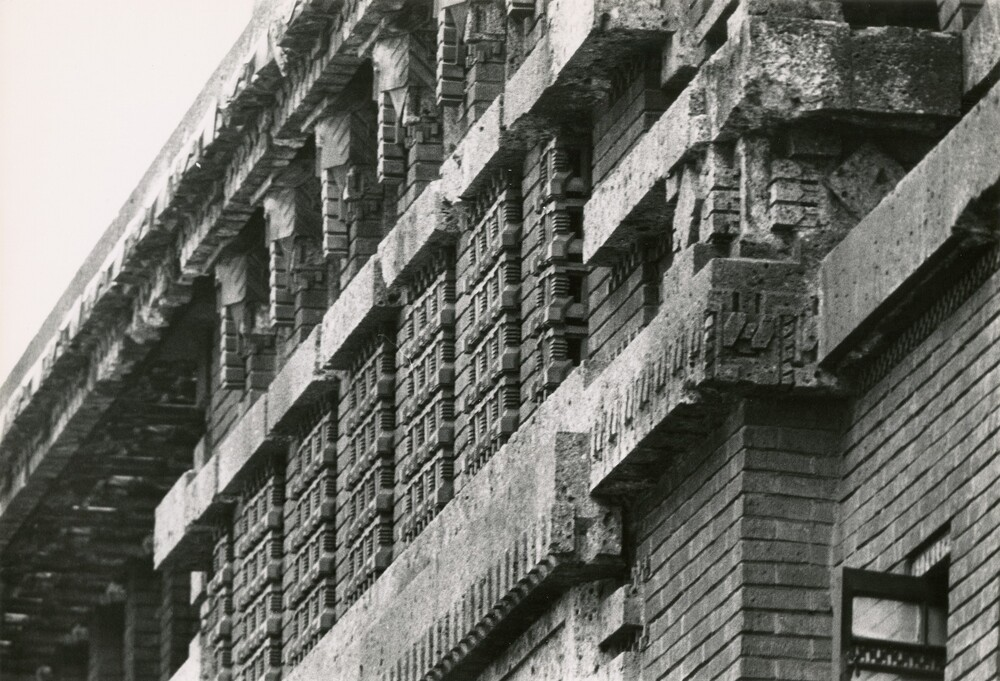
Wall with Decorative Stonework

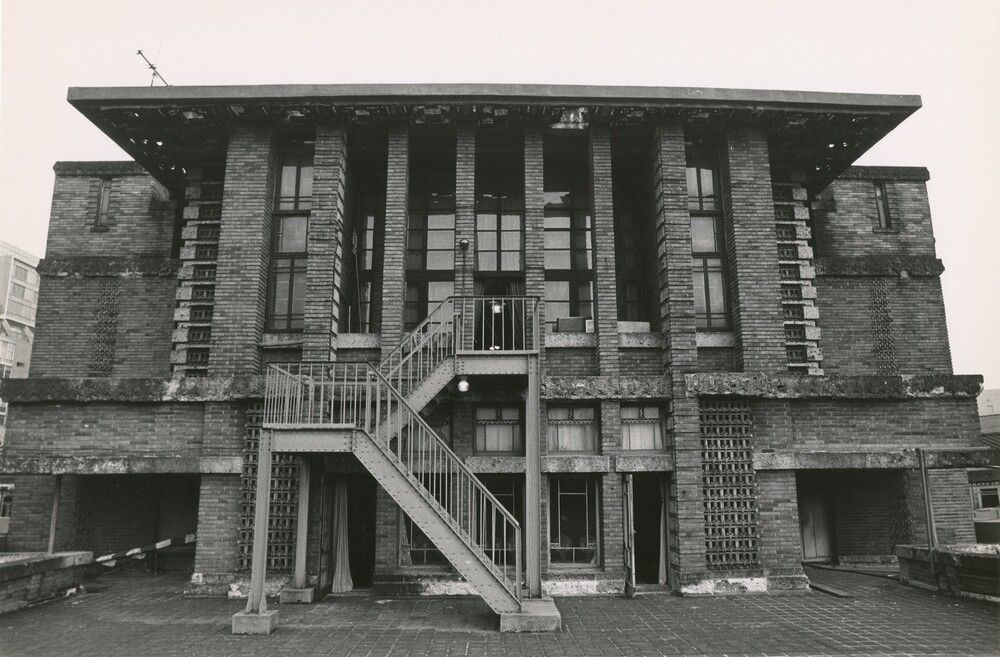
Side Entrance

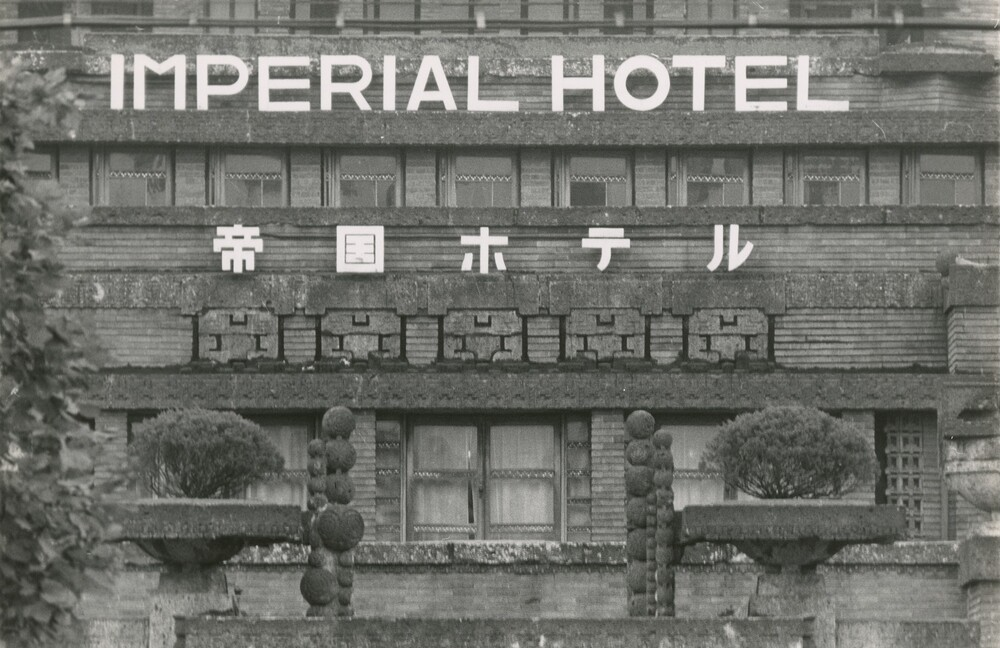
Imperial Hotel Sign

=== Third Imperial Hotel: 1968–present ===
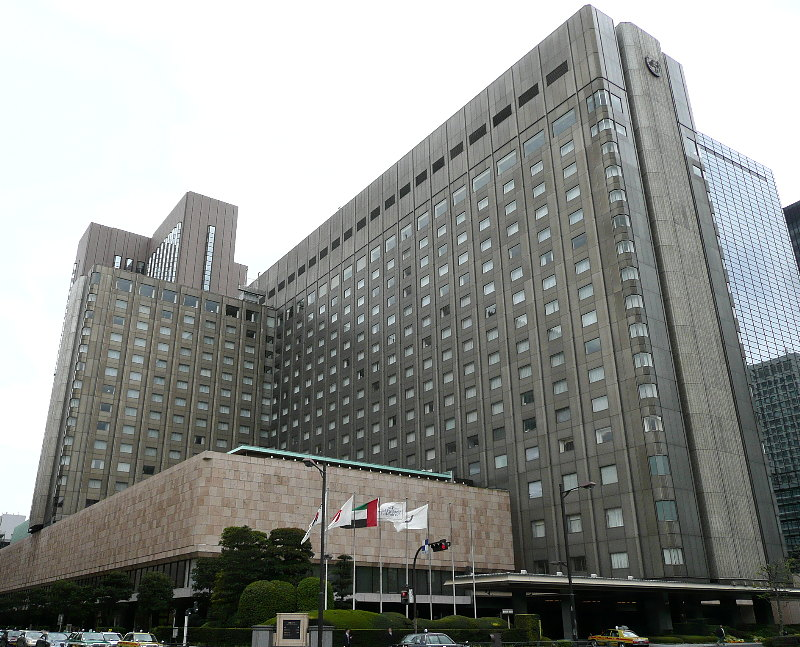
The current Imperial Hotel

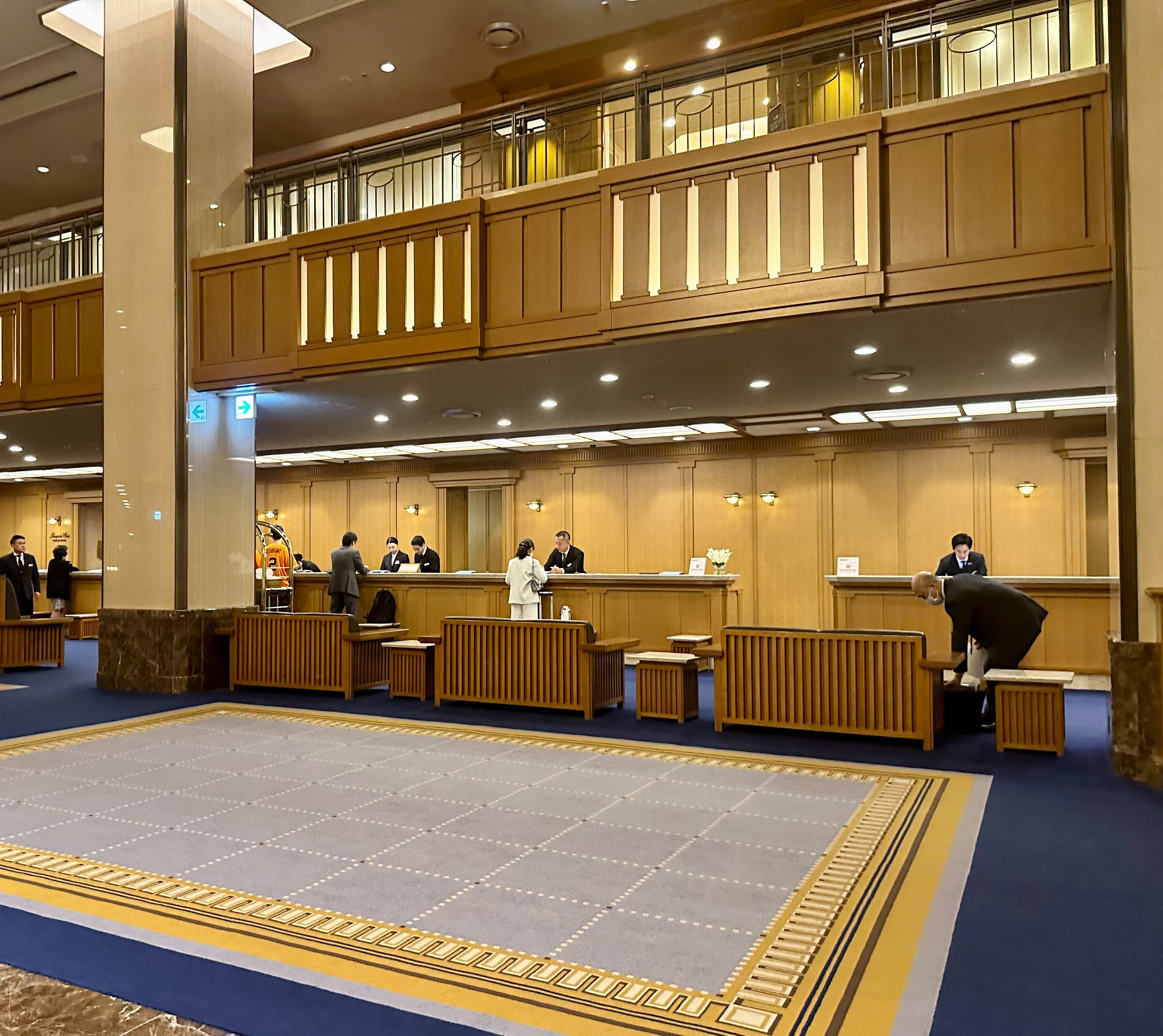
Inside the current Imperial Hotel, 2023

Although there had been talk of replacing the Wright hotel since before the planned 1940 Olympics, the first serious mention of plans for a new building was in 1963 when board minutes show that Takahashi Teitaro had been sent to the United States to look at hotels and start planning. At the 16 October 1966, board meeting, a plan to build a new hotel, to be completed in time for Expo '70 in Osaka, was unanimously approved. Ground was broken on 28 February 1968, just after demolition of the Wright building was completed. The 10 story parking garage just south of the annexes was completed in 1969, before the rest of the third main building. The third main building, a 17-story hotel tower with 772 guest rooms, was constructed on the site of Wright's building and opened on 10 March 1970.

The 1954 and 1958 annexes were torn down in 1979. Construction of a 31-story mixed-use tower (known as the Imperial Hotel Tower Building or Imperial Hotel Tower annex) began on 25 December 1979 and opened on 13 March 1983. The tower contains four floors of shops (known as the Imperial Hotel Plaza), 14 floors of offices, and 363 guest rooms on the top 12 floors. The tower was in service for 40 years until its demolition in 2024.

==== Notable events ====
Princess Sayako (the third child and only daughter of Emperor Akihito and Empress Michiko of Japan, now Sayako Kuroda), was married at the hotel in 2005.

==== Redevelopment for fourth incarnation of hotel ====
In March 2021, it was reported that the Imperial Hotel's owners, real estate company Mitsui Fudosan, would close the hotel and demolish the existing buildings. The structures will be cleared, along with neighboring buildings, for construction of a new $2 billion development, which will be integrated with the adjacent Hibiya Park by a bridge covering the six-lane road that separates them. A high-rise tower annex to the hotel is expected to open first, on the site of the 1983 tower, in 2030, at which point the 1970 Main Building itself will be rebuilt. The new fourth Imperial Hotel itself is not expected to be completed and reopened until 2036. Tsuyoshi Tane was hired to design a new main building for the Imperial Hotel.

The Imperial Hotel Plaza (which comprises the lower floors of the 1983 Imperial Hotel Tower annex) and offices closed on 31 March 2024. The hotel portion of the 1983 tower closed on 30 June 2024 and demolition of the tower commenced thereafter. The 1970 main tower remained open; due to rising construction costs, its closure had been pushed back to 2030.

== See also ==
- Fujiya Hotel
- Nagoya Hotel
- Nikkō Kanaya Hotel
- List of Frank Lloyd Wright works
