= Yamato Life =

Japanese life insurance company

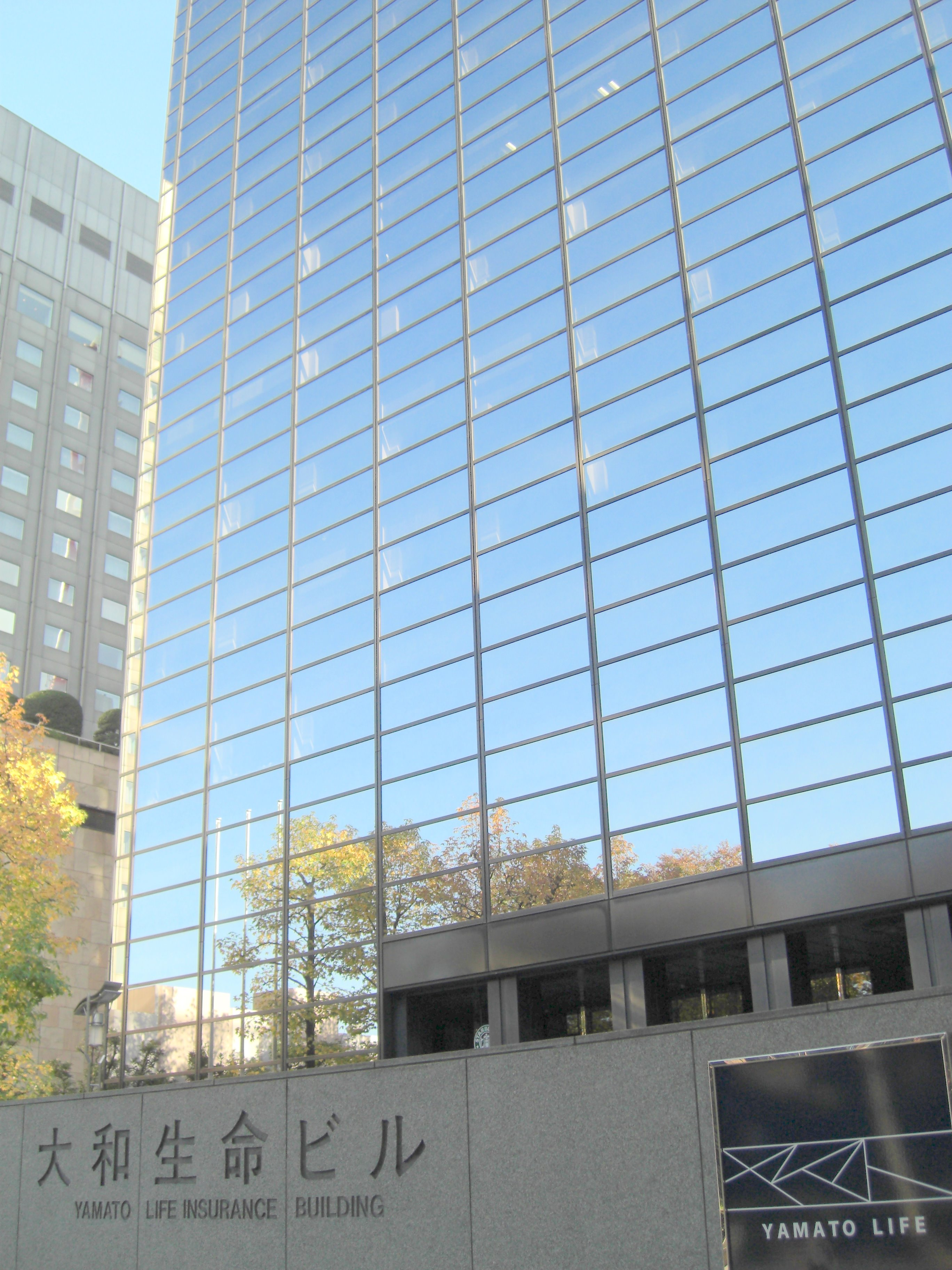
Yamato Life Insurance Building in Uchisaiwaichō, before its demolition in 2023

The Yamato Life Insurance Company (大和生命保険, Yamato Seimei Hoken Kabushiki-gaisha) (TYO: 0018) was a life-insurance company in Japan. Yamato's headquarters were in Uchisaiwaichō, Chiyoda, Tokyo.

== History ==
The company was founded on September 20, 1889, and was capitalized at ¥12,086,963,000. In 1911, it entered the market for conscription insurance (under the name Nippon Chōhei Hoken), but after Japan's defeat in World War II and the elimination of military conscription, it changed its focus to life insurance and changed its name to Yamato Life in 1945. It has policies valued at ¥34,500,000,000.

== Bankruptcy ==
The company filed for bankruptcy on October 10, 2008 after the 2008 financial crisis significantly devalued its assets particularly mortgages in Nevada. Its assets would later be acquired by the American-based insurance company Prudential Financial.
