= Yoshiya Tanoue =

Japanese architect

Yoshiya Tanoue (Japanese: 田上義也, Tanoue Yoshiya) was a Japanese architect. He was a pupil of Frank Lloyd Wright.

He designed the Sakaushi residence in Otaru, Hokkaido, which was constructed in 1927. It is a blend of Japanese and western architecture.

== See also ==
- Arata Endo
