= Imperial Hotel (company) =

Japanese hotel company

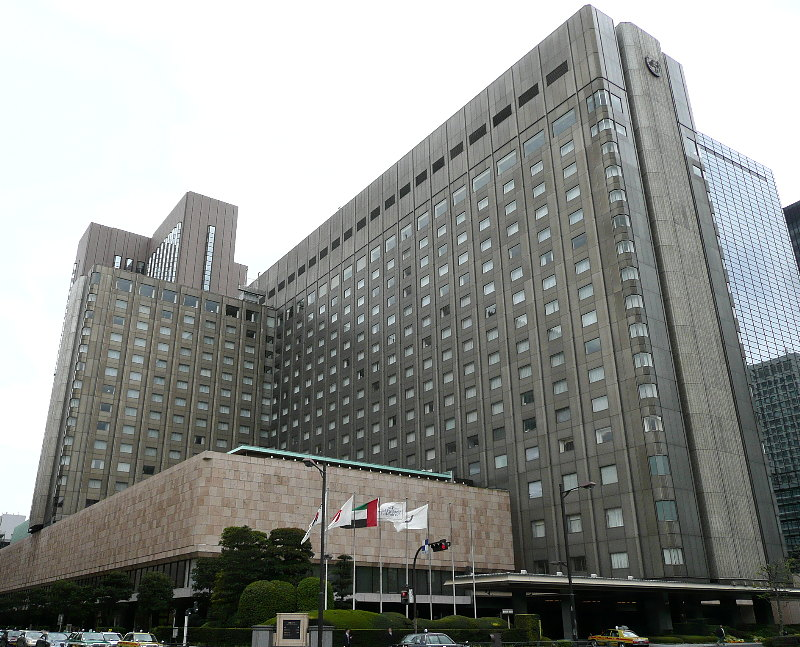
- Imperial Hotel Tokyo
- Industry: Hotels
- Founded: 1887
- Headquarters: Chiyoda Ward, Tokyo, Japan
- Parent: Mitsui Fudosan (33.16%)
- Website: www.imperialhotel.co.jp/e/index.html

Imperial Hotel, Ltd. (株式会社帝国ホテル, Kabushiki gaisha Teikoku Hoteru, TYO: 9708) is a company that operates hotels in Japan. Its flagship hotel is the Imperial Hotel, Tokyo (帝国ホテル東京), and its headquarters are located in the Chiyoda Ward of Tokyo, near the Imperial Palace, Hibiya Park, and Ginza.

== History ==
On November 28, 1887, Kihachiro Okura and Eiichi Shibusawa submitted an application to form a new company called Yugen Sekinin Tokyo Hoteru (Tokyo Hotel Co.), in order to "build a large hotel in Tokyo and to conduct the business of renting rooms to foreign guests, and for parties and other events..." There were initially 21 investors, with the largest (21.15%) being the Imperial Household Ministry. Site preparation for the first Imperial Hotel started in July 1888, and construction began in the fall of that year. On 7 July 1890, with the hotel almost complete, the name was changed to Yugen Sekinen Teikoku Hoteru Kaisha (Imperial Hotel Ltd.).

On January 25, 1907, the Kabushiki Kaisha Hoteru Metropole (Hotel Metropole Ltd.) merged with the Teikoku Hoteru Kabushiki Kaisha (Imperial Hotel Ltd.) and the combined company name was changed to Kabushiki Kaisha Teikoku Hoteru (still Imperial Hotel Ltd. when translated to English).

== The Imperial Hotel group ==
The Imperial Hotel Ltd. manages the following hotels in Japan:

- Imperial Hotel, Tokyo (帝国ホテル東京): 1-1, Uchisaiwaicho 1-chome, Chiyoda, Tokyo 100-8558
- Imperial Hotel, Osaka (帝国ホテル大阪): 8-50, Temmabashi 1-chome, Kita-ku, Osaka-shi, Osaka 530-0042
- Kamikochi Imperial Hotel (上高地帝国ホテル): Kamikochi, Matsumoto-shi, Nagano 390-1516
- The Crest Hotel Kashiwa (ザ・クレストホテル柏): 14-1, Suehiro-cho, Kashiwa-shi, Chiba 277-0842
- The Grand Arc Hanzomon (グランドアーク半蔵門): 1-1, Hayabusa-machi, Chiyoda-ku, Tokyo 102-009
- Zenkoku Choson Kaikan (全国町村会館): 1-11-35 Nagatacho, Chiyoda, Tokyo 100-0014
