= Kōshien Hotel =

Building in Nishinomiya, Hyōgo, Japan

Coordinates: 34°44′03″N 135°22′41″E

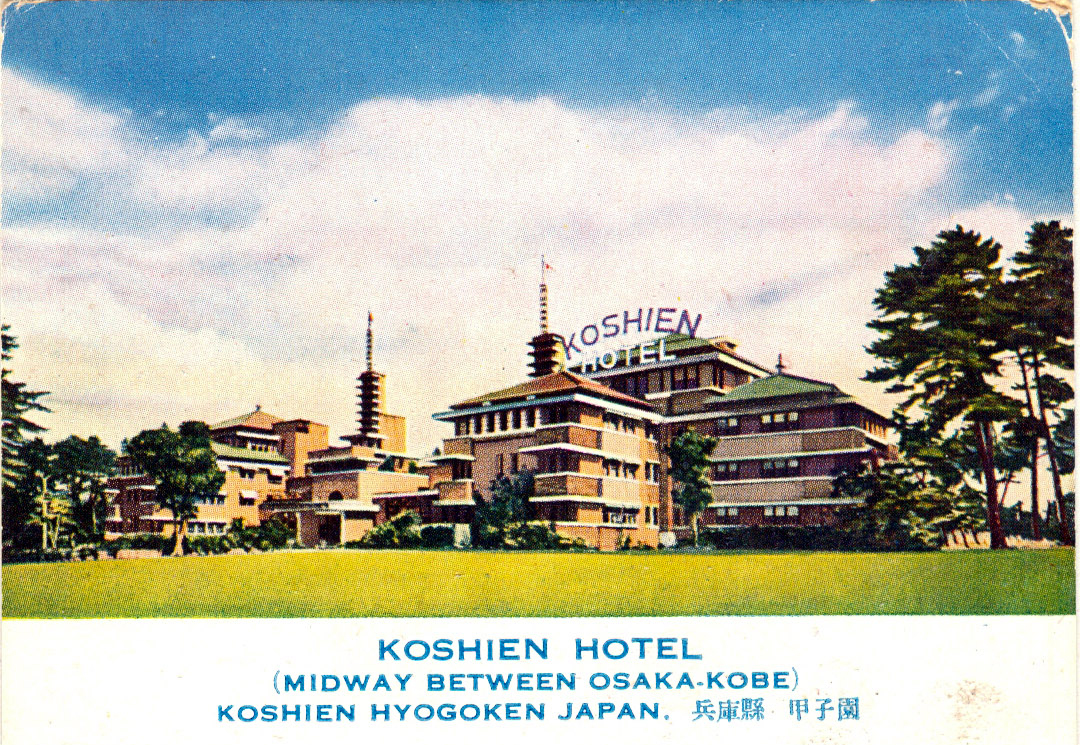
Koshien Hotel, “midway between Osaka-Kobe”, c. 1930, designed by Arata Endo

The Kōshien Hotel (甲子園ホテル, Kōshien Hoteru) was a Mayan Revival-style hotel in Nishinomiya, Hyōgo, Japan, constructed by Arata Endo, a disciple of Frank Lloyd Wright. It is now used as a hall forming part of Mukogawa Women's University, and is known as the Kōshien Kaikan (甲子園会館).

== History ==
The architectural style is heavily influenced by the Imperial Hotel, Tokyo. Even though the original Imperial Hotel by Wright does not exist anymore, the Kōshien Hotel gives an idea how the building must have felt like.

The Kōshien Hotel opened in 1930. From 1944, it was used as an Imperial Navy hospital, and in 1945 it became used as accommodation for the US military.

In 1965, it was donated to Mukogawa Women's University, and was refurbished internally and externally. It is now part of the department of architecture campus.
