= Arata Endo =

Japanese architect (1889–1951)

- 遠藤新
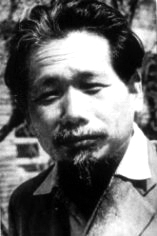
- Born: June 1, 1889; Fukuda Village, Uta, Fukushima, Empire of Japan
- Died: June 29, 1951 (aged 62); Hongō, Bunkyō, Tokyo, Japan
- Education: Tokyo Imperial University
- Occupation: Architect
- Notable work: Jiyu Gakuen Girls' School Auditorium; Kōshien Hotel

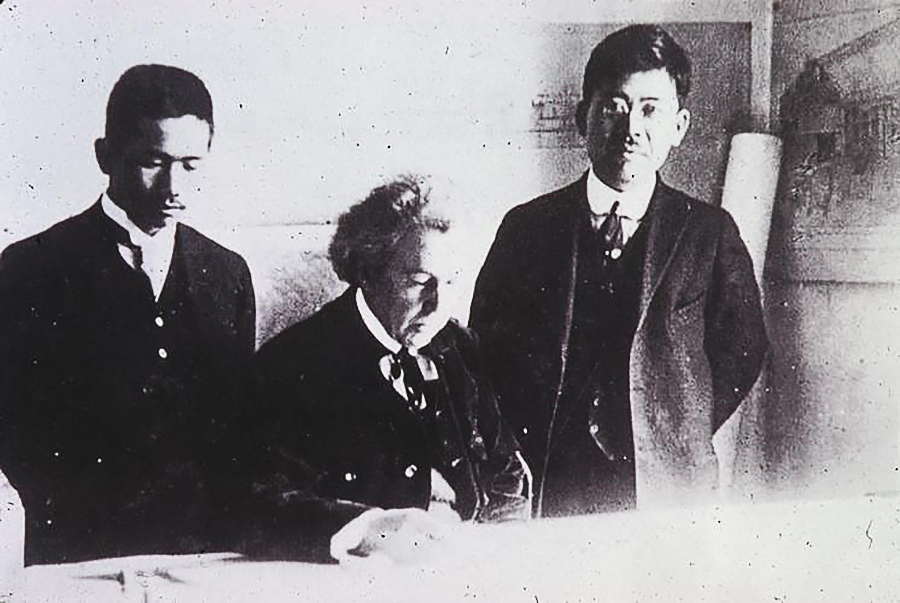
Arata Endo (left) standing next to Frank Lloyd Wright

Arata Endo (Japanese: 遠藤 新) (January 1, 1889 - June 29, 1951) was a Japanese architect. He was a disciple of Frank Lloyd Wright. One of his most important works was the Kōshien Hotel, the architectural style being heavily influenced by Wright's Imperial Hotel, Tokyo.

== Biography ==
Arata Endo was educated at Tokyo Imperial University, now Tokyo University. In 1917–18, he was a disciple of Frank Lloyd Wright in his studio in Taliesin, a few miles south of Spring Green, Wisconsin, USA, and worked on Wright's project in Japan. He was an assistant to Wright in Japan with the Imperial Hotel in Tokyo in the early 1920s. Together they designed the Jiyu Gakuen Girls' School in Toshima, Tokyo, as well as the Tazaemon Yamamura House.

His largest and most famous work was the Kōshien Hotel in Nishinomiya in Hyōgo prefecture from 1930, whose style was influenced by the Imperial Hotel in Tokyo. He also designed several buildings for Jiyu Gakuen's Minamisawa campus. He accompanied the Japanese occupying forces to Manchukuo in the 1930s and was trapped after the war for a period in China before repatriation to Japan.

Arata Endo designed several schools with his sons Raku and Tou Endo. He died in 1951 while working with Mejirogaoka Church in the Mejiro district of Shinjuku, Tokyo. He was religious and a Christian.

== Gallery ==
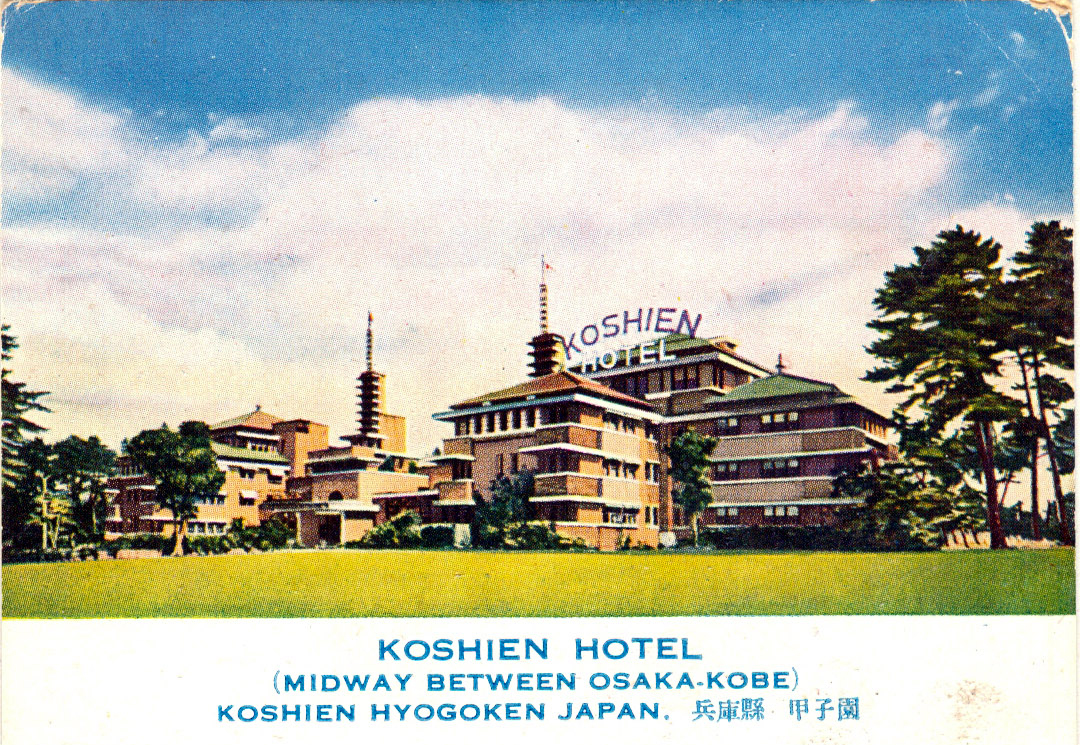
Koshien Hotel

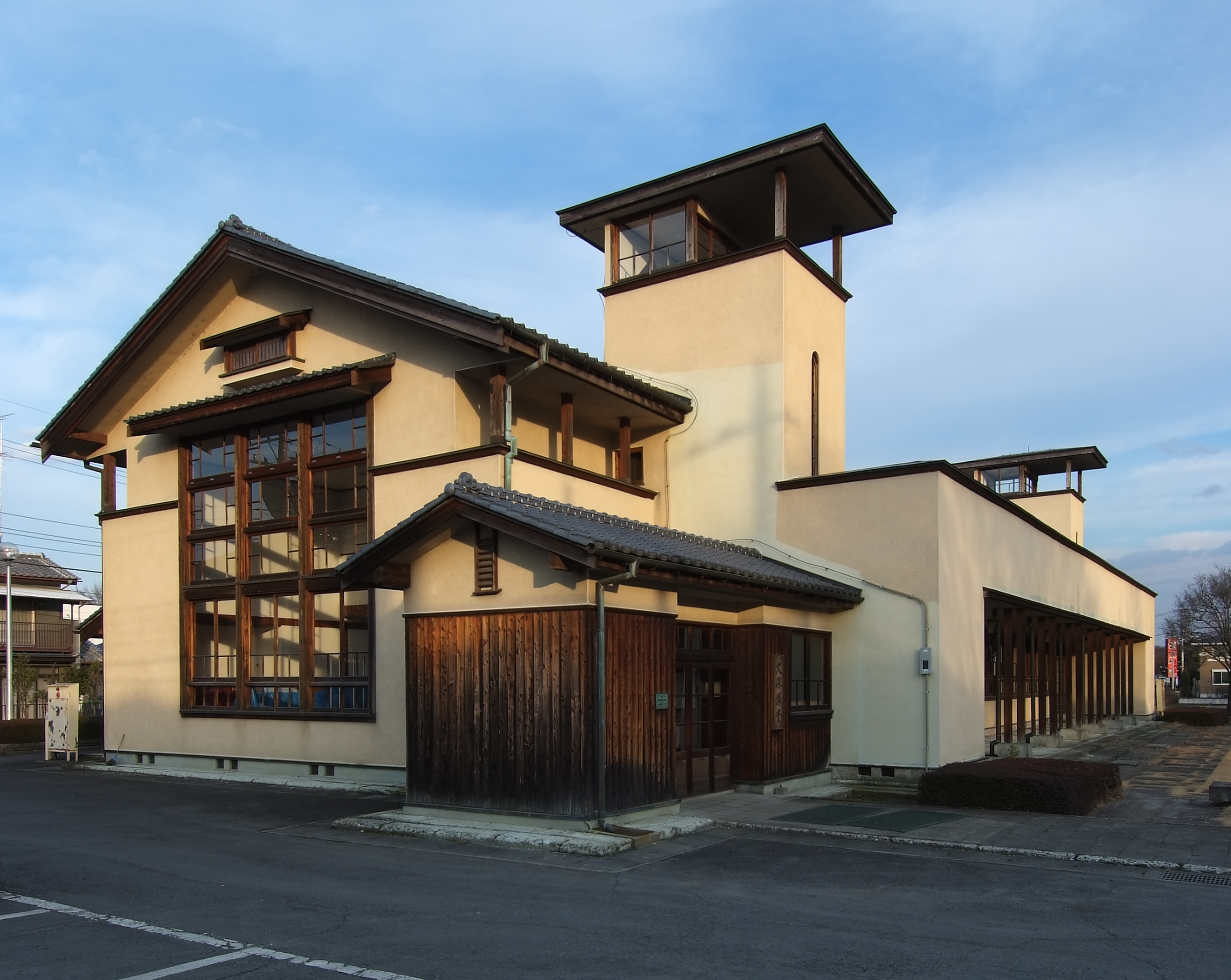
Auditorium of Mooka City

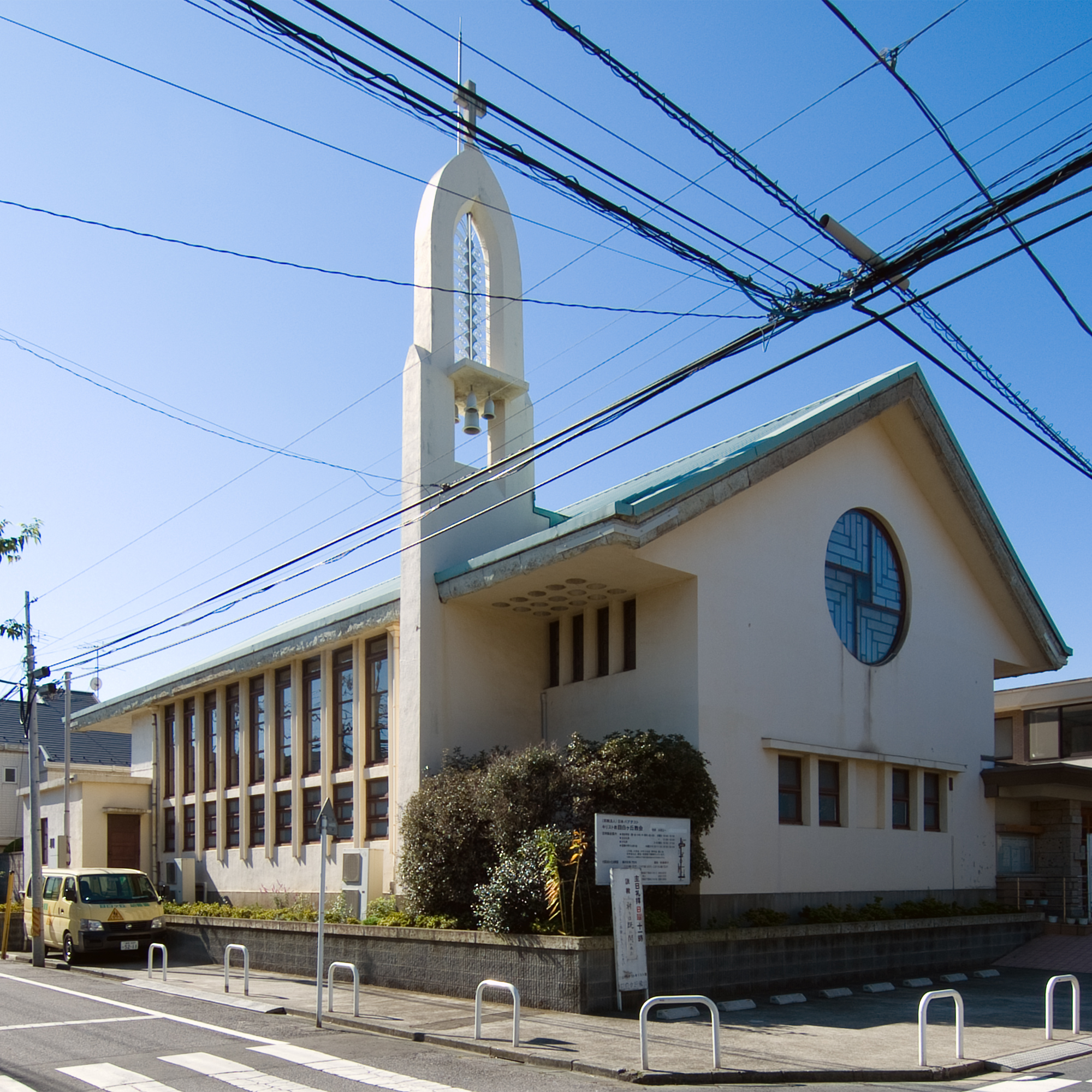
Mejiro-ga-oka Church

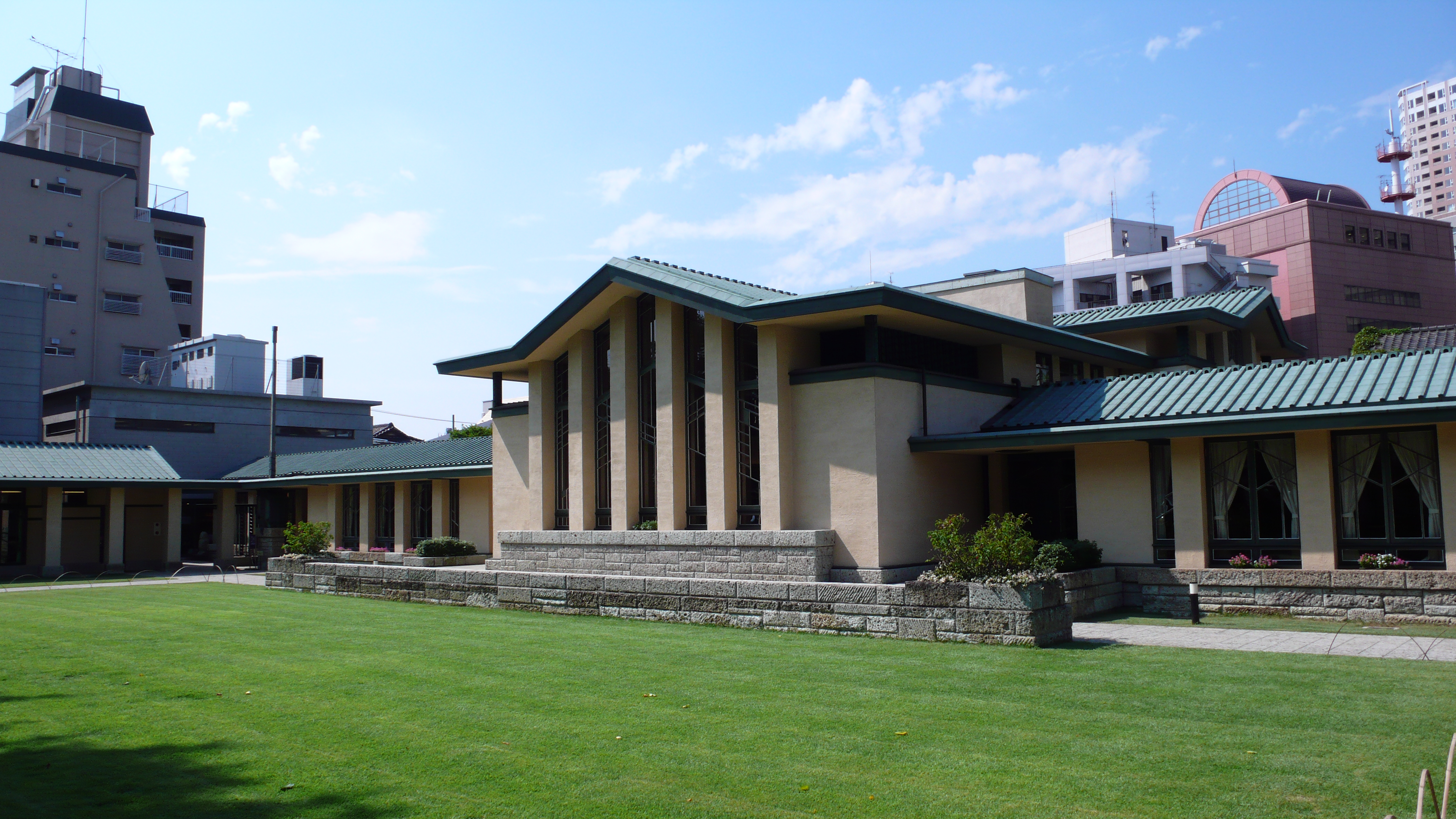
Jiyu Gakuens girls school

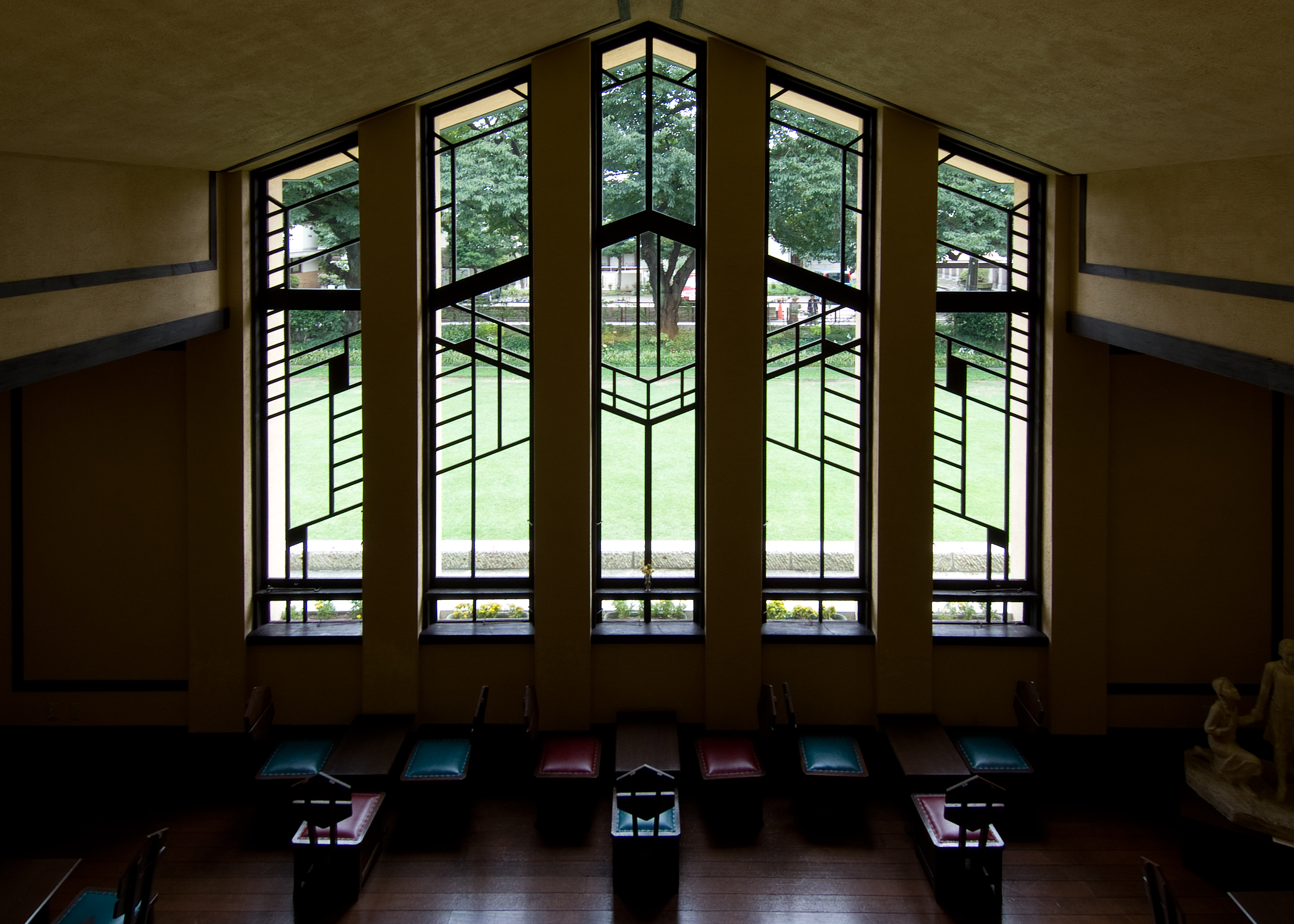
The auditorium in Jiyu Gakuen's girls' school

== See also ==
- Yoshiya Tanoue
