= Uchisaiwaichō =

District of Chiyoda, Tokyo, Japan

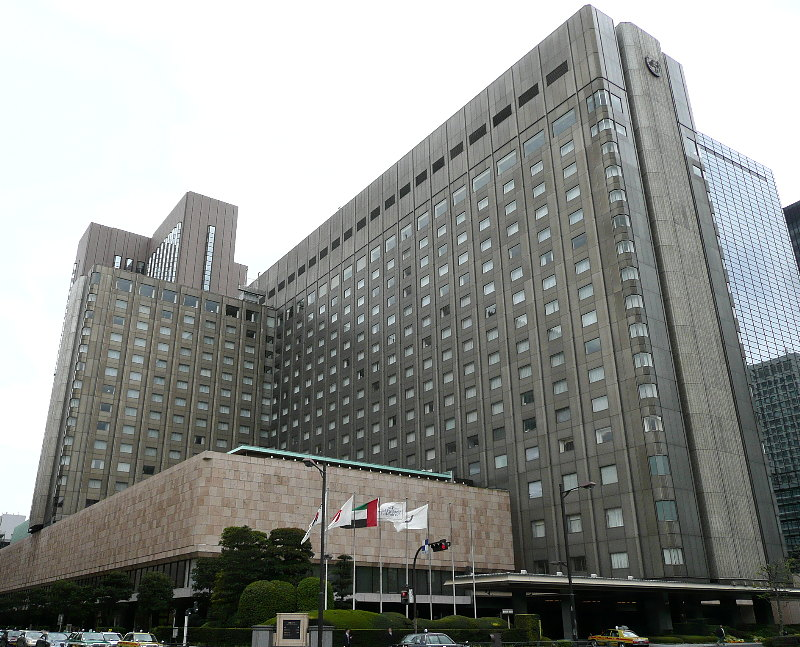
Imperial Hotel, Tokyo

Uchisaiwaichō (内幸町) is a district of Chiyoda, Tokyo, at the south-east corner of the ward bordering with Chūō and Minato. Uchisaiwaichō Station on the Toei Mita Line is located in the area. Parts of the Hibiya Station and Shimbashi Station are also located in the neighborhood.

== History ==
In the late Edo period, the present-day Uchiwaisaichō area was a part of the Hibiya area. Many daimyō's mansions were located in the area, which was within the outer moat of Edo Castle.

After the Meiji Restoration, it was known for a time as Uchiyamashita-cho before the name "Uchisaiwaichō" was adopted after its location between Saiwaibashi Bridge (幸橋, Saiwaibashi) on the Outer Moat and Saiwai Gate (幸御門, Saiwai-gomon). The Tokyo National Museum was originally located in the area.

== Businesses ==
- Amundi Japan
- China Airlines
- Ernst & Young ShinNihon LLC
- Fukoku Mutual Life Insurance
- Imperial Hotel
- JFE Steel
- Kroll Inc.
- Mizuho Bank
- NTT Communications
- Shinsei Bank
- Tokyo Electric Power Company (TEPCO)

Before Yamato Life declared bankruptcy, its headquarters was in Uchisaiwaichō.

== Education ==
Chiyoda Board of Education operates public elementary and junior high schools. Chiyoda Elementary School (千代田小学校) is the zoned elementary school for Uchisaiwaichō 1-2 chōme. There is a freedom of choice system for junior high schools in Chiyoda Ward, and so there are no specific junior high school zones.
