= Robert Stacy-Judd =

American architect (1884–1975)

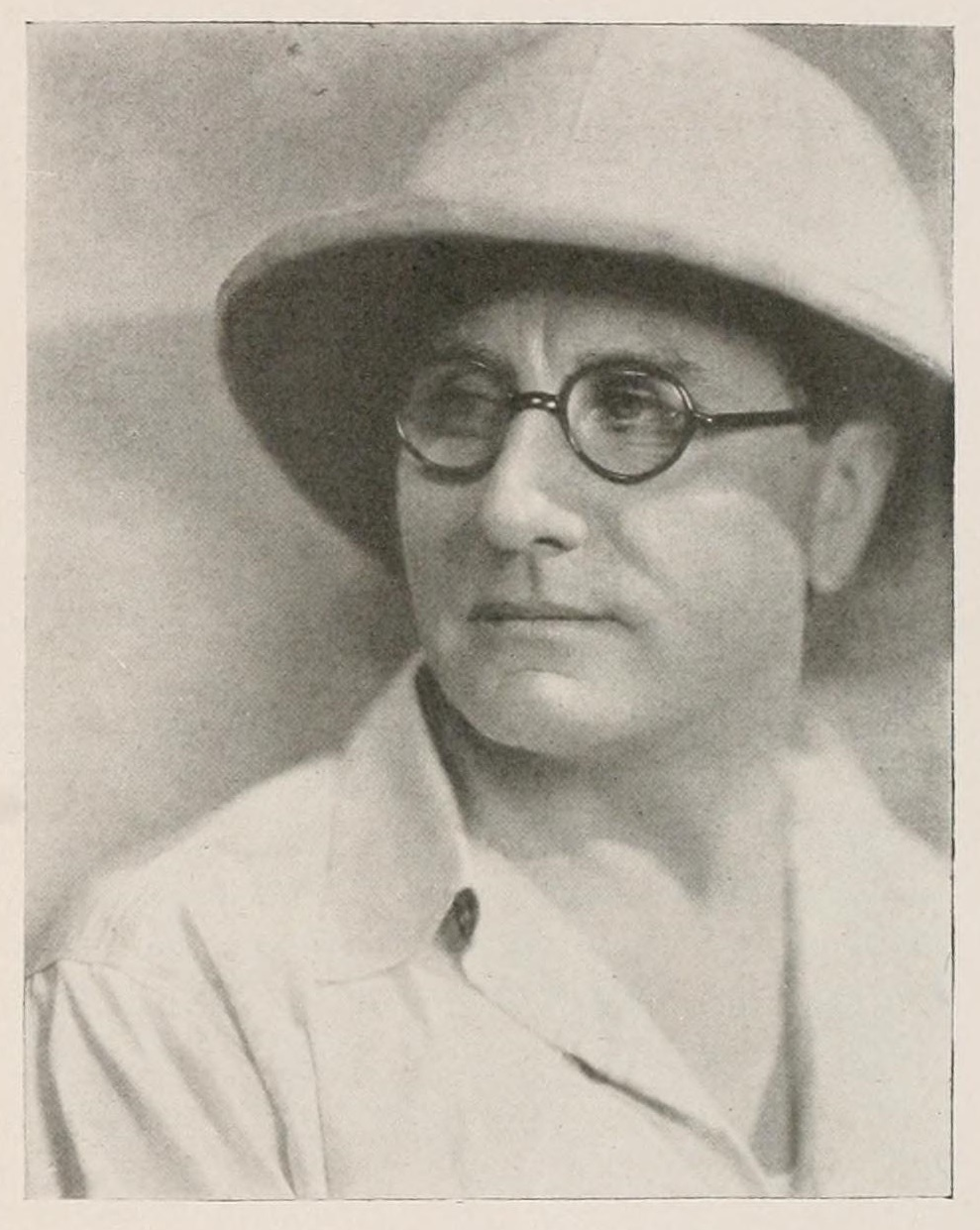

Robert Stacy-Judd (1884–1975) was an English architect and author who designed theaters, hotels, private residences, and other commercial buildings in the Mayan Revival architecture Style in Great Britain and the United States. Stacy-Judd's synthesis of the style used Maya architecture, Aztec architecture, and Art Deco precedents as his influences.

== Aztec Hotel ==
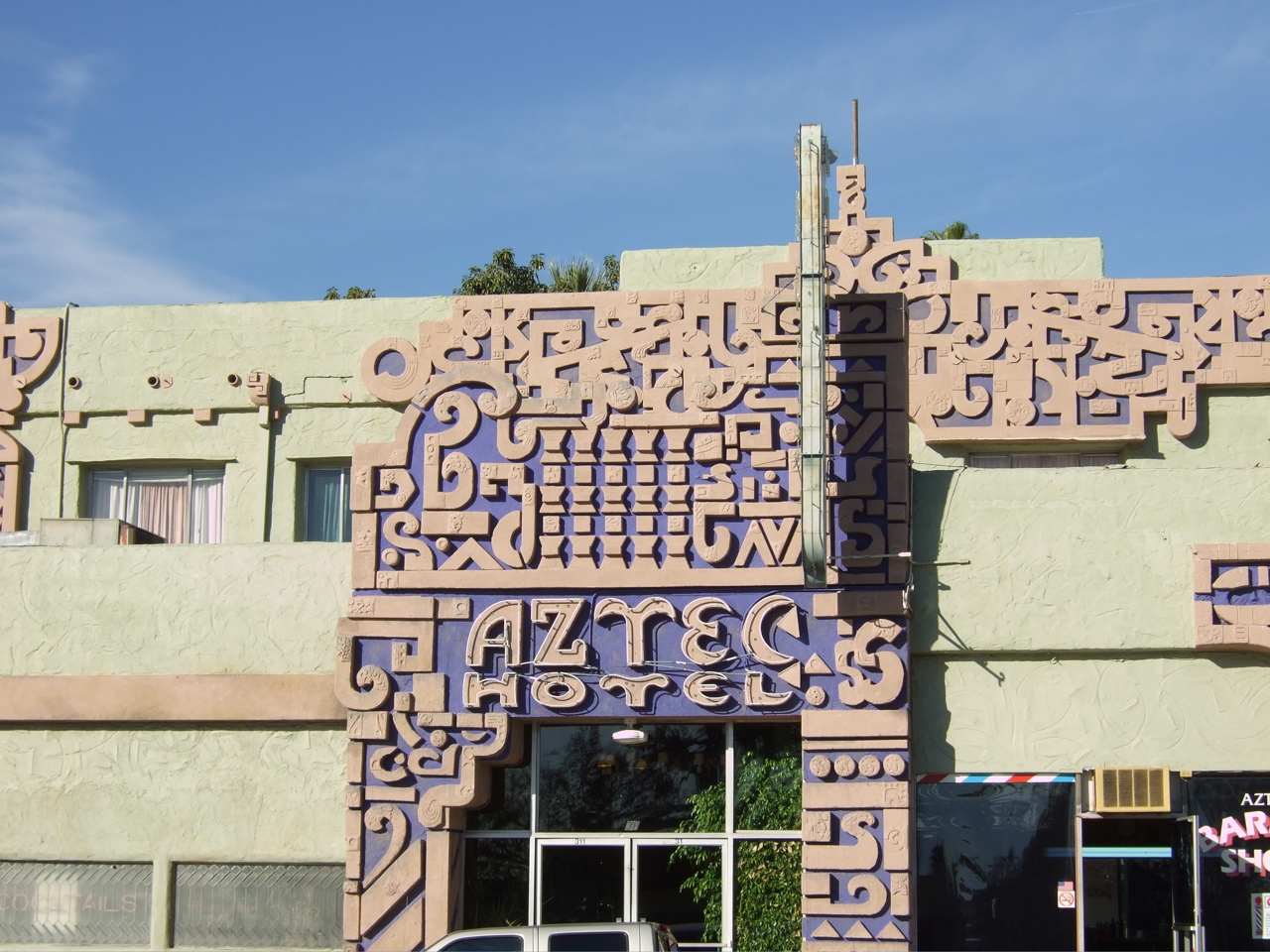
Aztec Hotel by Robert Stacy-Judd

Stacy-Judd's most celebrated Mayan Revival designed building is the Aztec Hotel, focusing on the facades, interiors, and furniture. It was built in 1924 on the original U.S. Route 66, and is located in Monrovia, Southern California. Stacy-Judd explained the choice of the name of the hotel.

When the hotel project was first announced, the word Maya was unknown to the layman. The subject of Maya culture was only of archaeological importance, a, at that, concerned but a few exponents. As a word Aztec was fairly well known, I baptized the hotel with that name, although all the decorative motifs are Maya

== Works ==
Works include (with attribution as appears in National Register listing):

- Aztec Hotel, 311 W. Foothill Blvd. Monrovia, CA (Stacy-Judd, Robert B.), NRHP-listed
- First Baptist Church of Ventura, 101 S. Laurel St. Ventura, CA (Stacy-Judd, Robert Benjamin), NRHP-listed
- North Hollywood Masonic Temple, 5122 Tujunga Ave., North Hollywood, CA
- Old Armory (Williston, North Dakota), 320 1st Ave., E. Williston, ND (Judd, Robert Stacy), NRHP-listed
- Old Tioga High School-West Section, (Tioga, ND)
- The Philosophical Research Society, 1934, Mayan Revival: 3910 Los Feliz Blvd., Los Angeles, CA
- The "Indian Village" at Soboba Hot Springs, Riverside County, California
- The "Atwater Bungalows" Two private residences at 1431 & 1433 Avon Park terrace in the neighborhood of Echo Park designated Los Angeles Historic-Cultural Monuments Los Angeles,
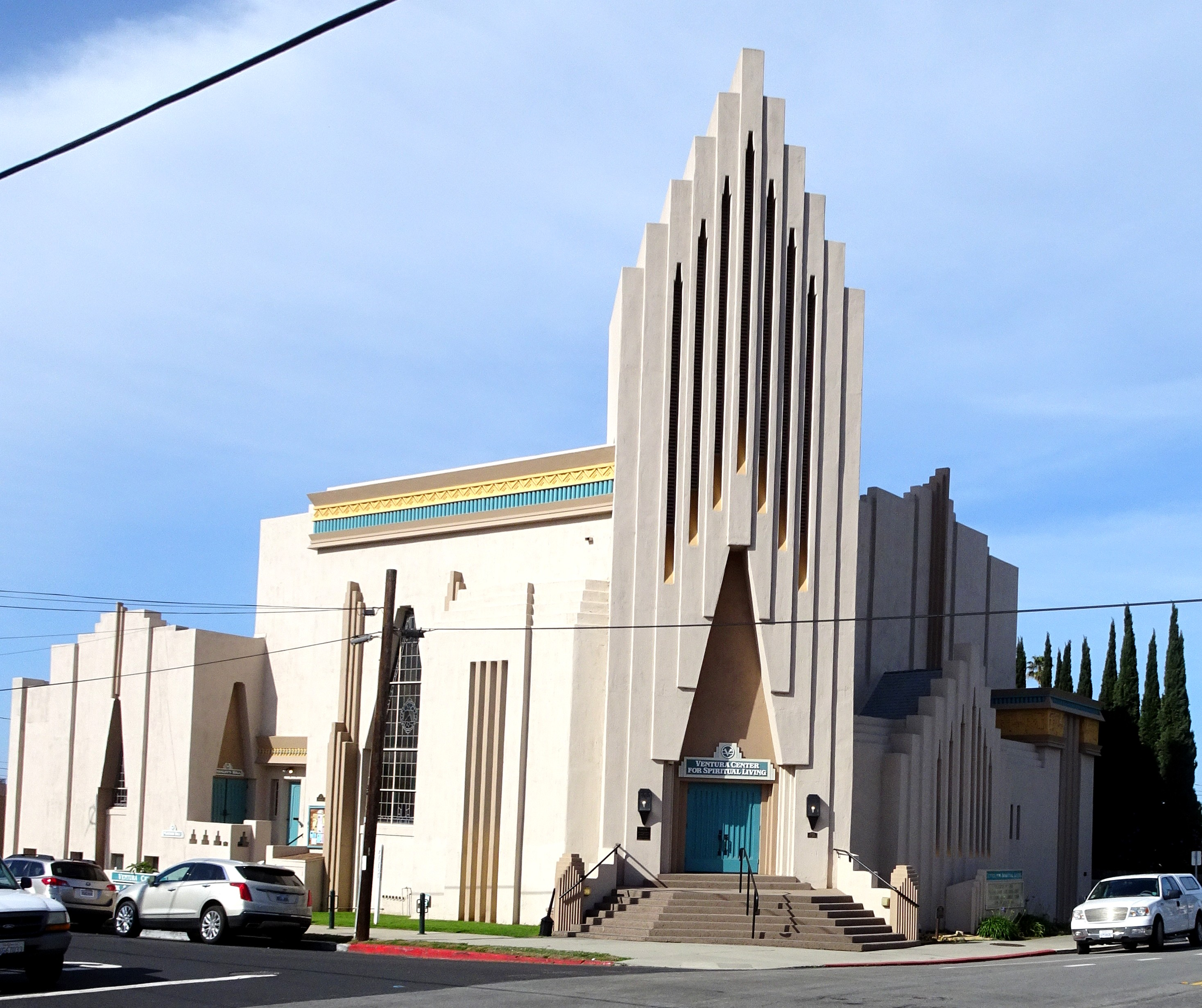
First Baptist Church of Ventura

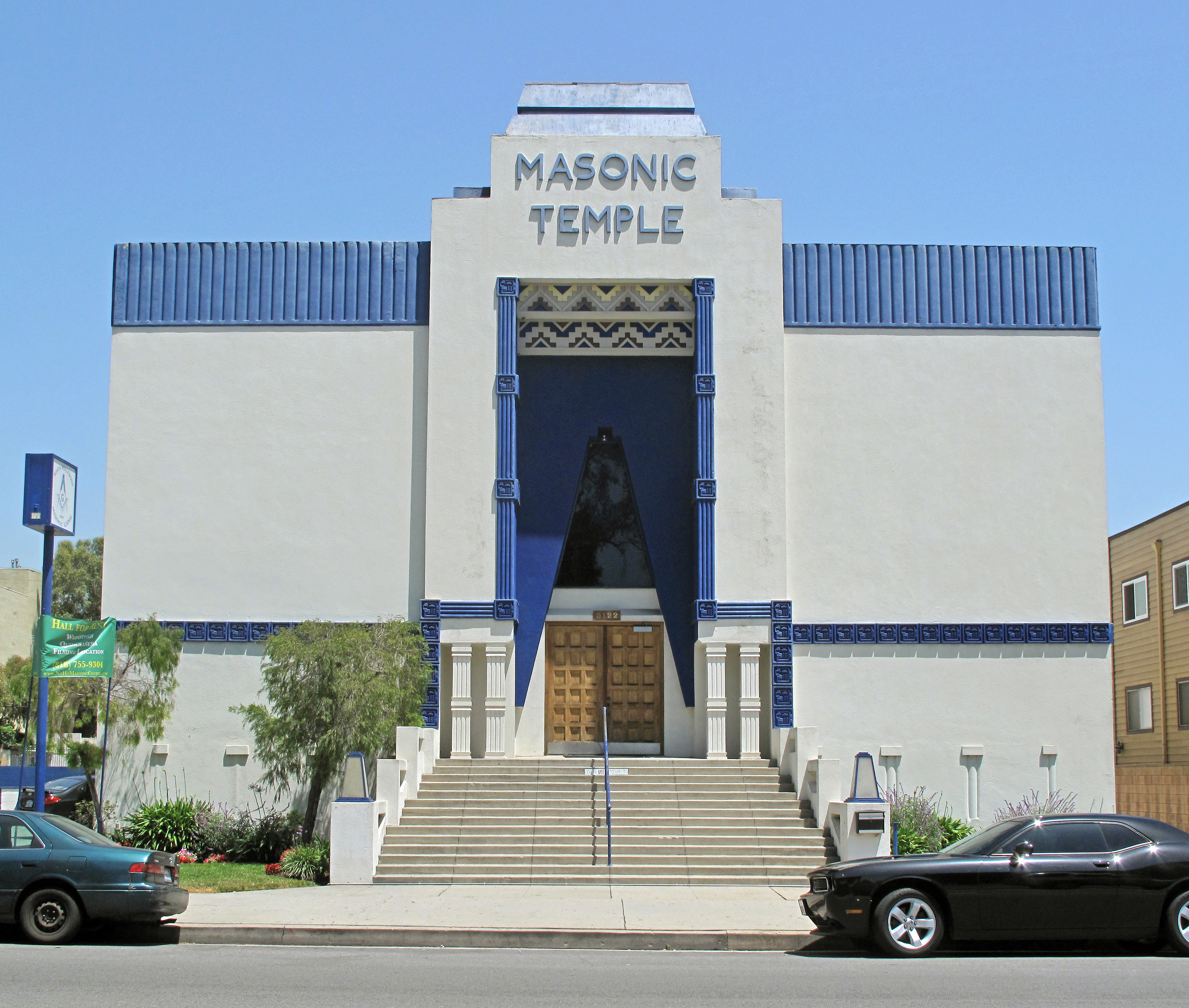
North Hollywood Masonic Temple

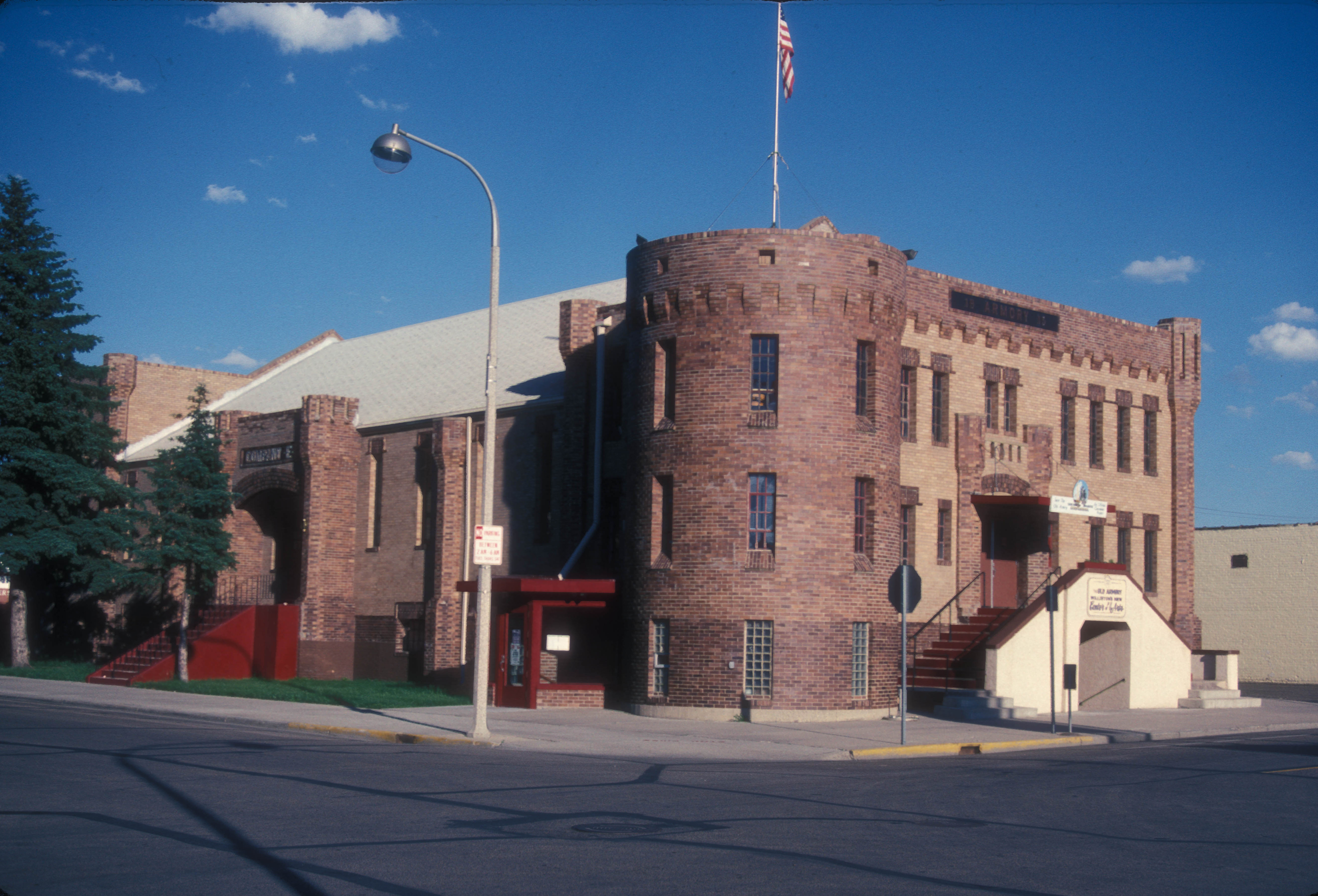
Old Armory in Williston, North Dakota

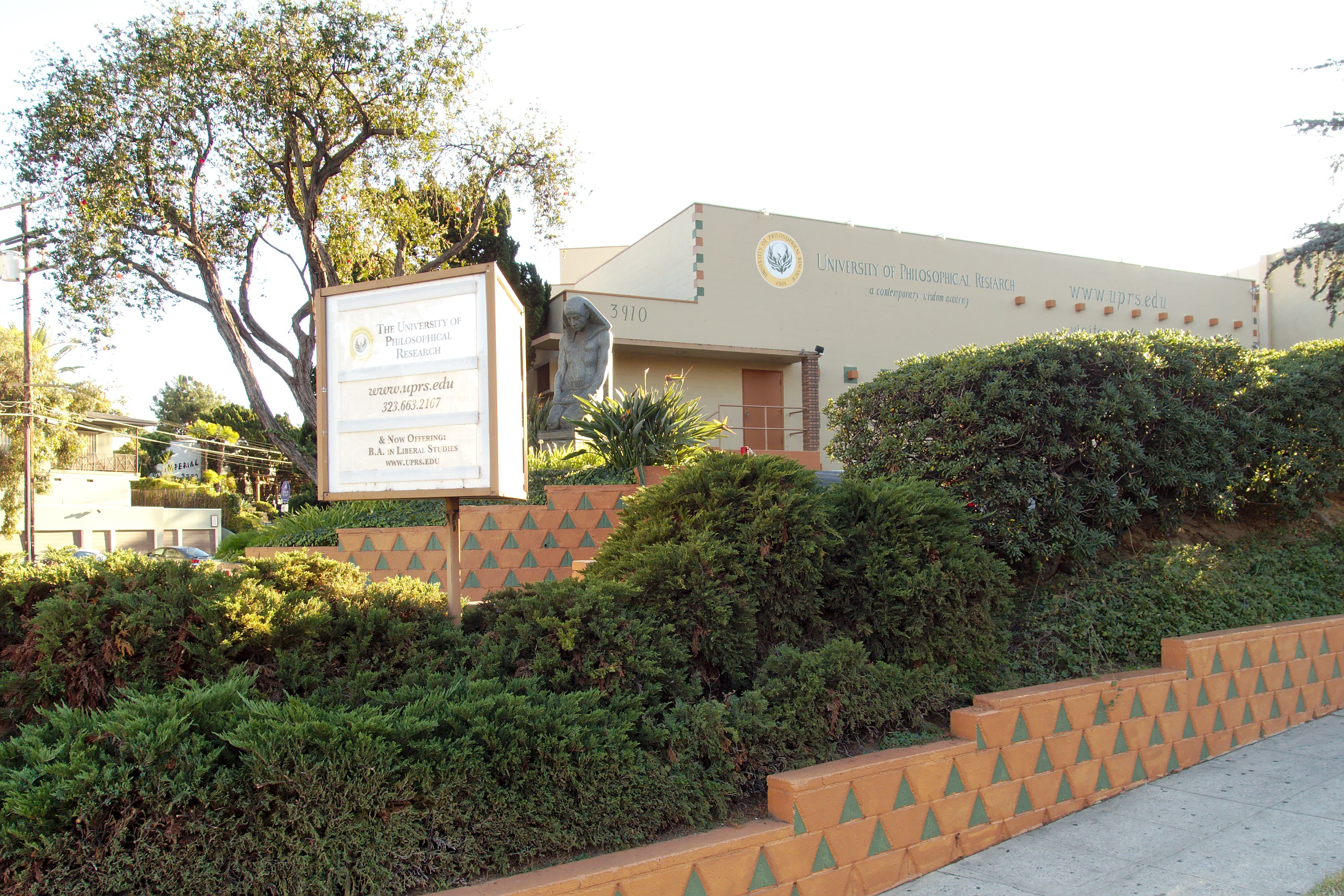
Philosophical Research Society

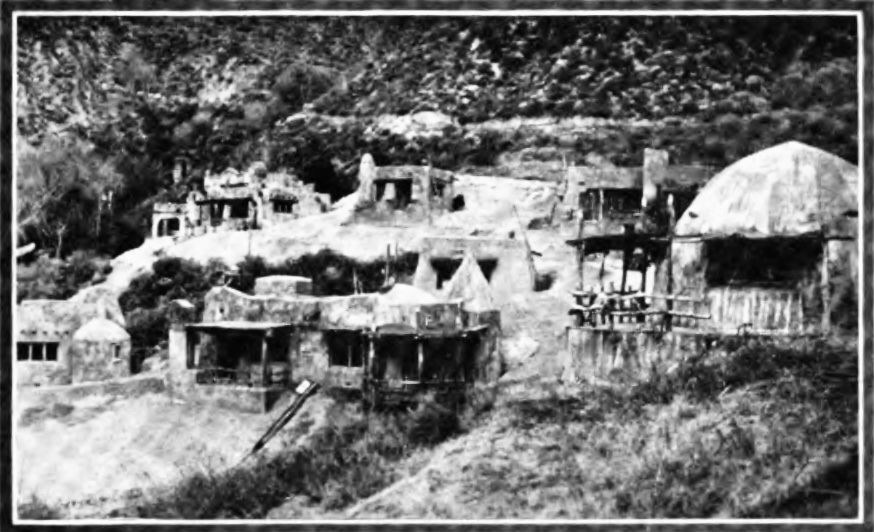
Soboba resort "Indian Village" Riverside County California

== Writing ==
Stacy-Judd was a friend of the writer T. A. Willard, who published a fanciful account of his travels to Chichen Itza, was extremely influenced by John Lloyd Stephens writings, and perhaps even more so by the illustrations by Frederick Catherwood as presented in their book 'Incidents of Travel in Central America, Chiapas and Yucatán'. a work that introduced many to the wondrous ruins of Central America. Possibly inspired by his friend T.A. Willard, Stacy-Judd published several popular books on Maya culture that blend fact and fiction.

== Bibliography ==
- Gebhard, David and Anthony Peres. Robert Stacy-Judd: Maya Architecture and the Creation of a New Style. Capra Press. 1993
- Ingle, Marjorie I. The Mayan Revival Style: Art Deco Mayan Fantasy. University of New Mexico Press. 1989
- ---. Atlantis: Mother of Empires. Los Angeles. De Vorse & Co. 1939
- ---. The Ancient Mayas, Adventures In the Jungles of Yucatan. Los Angeles. Haskell-Travers, Inc. 1934
- ---. A Maya Manuscript. Los Angeles. Philosophical Research Society. 1940.
- Willard, T. A., The City of the Sacred Well, Being a Narrative of the Discoveries and Excavations of Edward Herbert Thompson in the Ancient City of Chi-chen Itza With Some Discourse on the Culture and Development of the Mayan Civilization as Revealed by Their Art and Architecture, Here Set Down and Illustrated From Photographs. New York. Century Co. 1926
