= First Baptist Church of Ventura =

Historic church in California, United States

- U.S. National Register of Historic Places
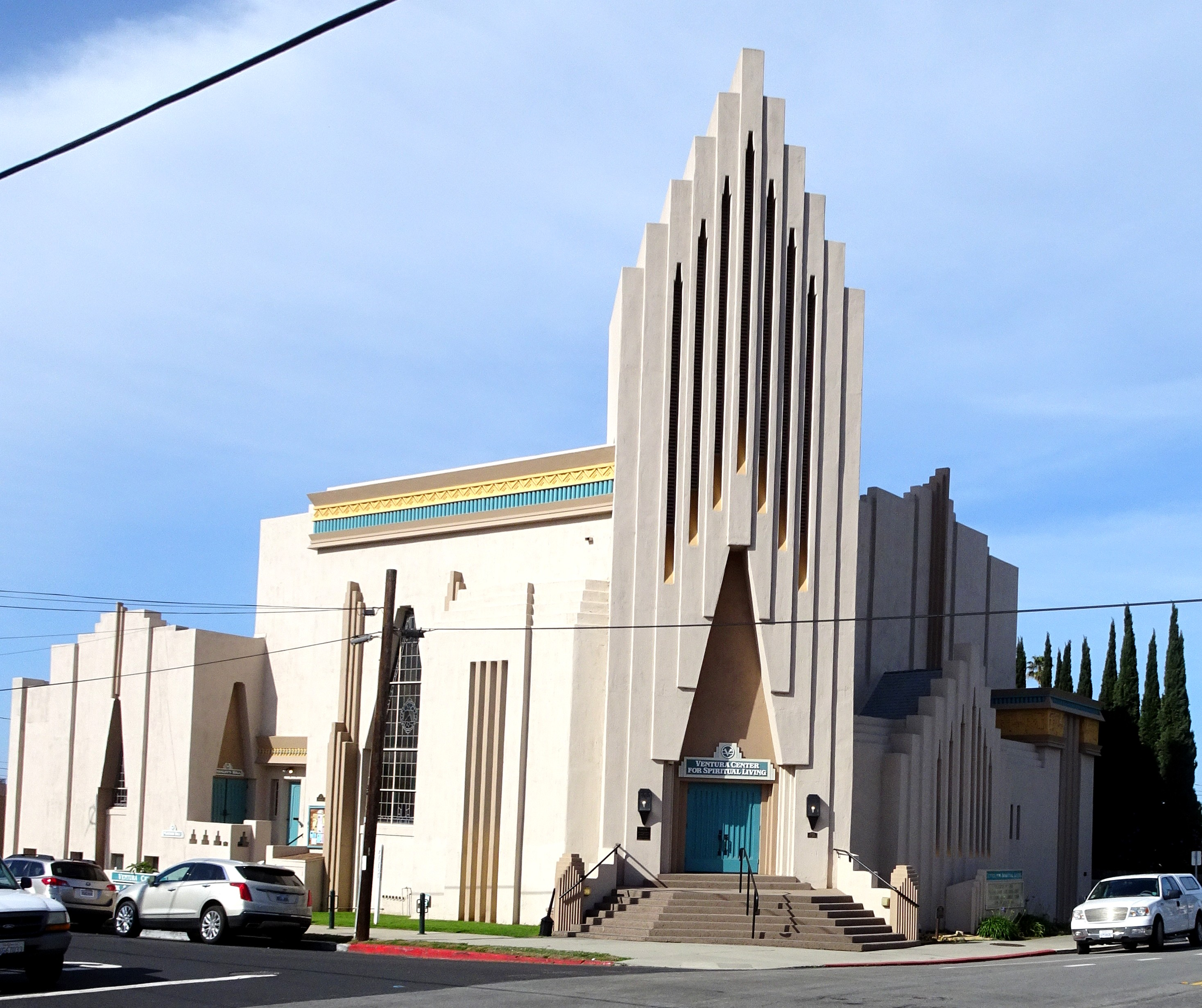

- Location within California Location within the United States
- Location: 101 S. Laurel St., Ventura, California
- Coordinates: 34°16′45″N 119°17′4″W
- Area: 0.3 acres (0.12 ha)
- Built: 1926; 1932
- Architect: Stacy-Judd, Robert Benjamin
- Architectural style: Late 19th and 20th Century Revivals
- NRHP reference No.: 09000466
- Added to NRHP: July 3, 2009

First Baptist Church of Ventura is a historic church at 101 S. Laurel Street in Ventura, California. It was built in 1926 and renovated extensively into the Mayan Revival style in 1932. Declared a landmark by the City of Ventura In 1975, the building was added to the National Register of Historic Places in 2009. Since 1952, it has been home to the Ventura Center for Spiritual Living.

According to its NRHP nomination, it was deemed nationally significant "as a fine and essentially unaltered example of a scarce property designed in the Mayan Revival style by its most prominent and widely-recognized proponent, architect Robert B. Stacy-Judd of Los Angeles. The First Baptist Church of Ventura exemplifies architectural exoticism by representing a moment in American architectural history when the public's desire for the new and different was at its peak. The property is the product of a rare convergence of national cultural events and a unique force of personality."

Some of his other notable Southern California commissions include the Aztec Hotel, (Monrovia), the Masonic Temple (North Hollywood, California), the Philosophical Research Society, (Los Feliz) and the Atwater Bungalows, (Elysian Park). The other architect known for working in this style was Frank Lloyd Wright. In Los Angeles his Hollyhock House and Ennis House are relevant examples. The Imperial Hotel in Tokyo was a zenith of this style. His son, the landscape architect and architect Lloyd Wright, designed the John Sowden House in a similar style.

== See also ==
- National Register of Historic Places listings in Ventura County, California
- Bardsdale United Methodist Church
- City of Ventura Historic Landmarks and Districts
