= North Hollywood Masonic Temple =

Historic building in North Hollywood, California

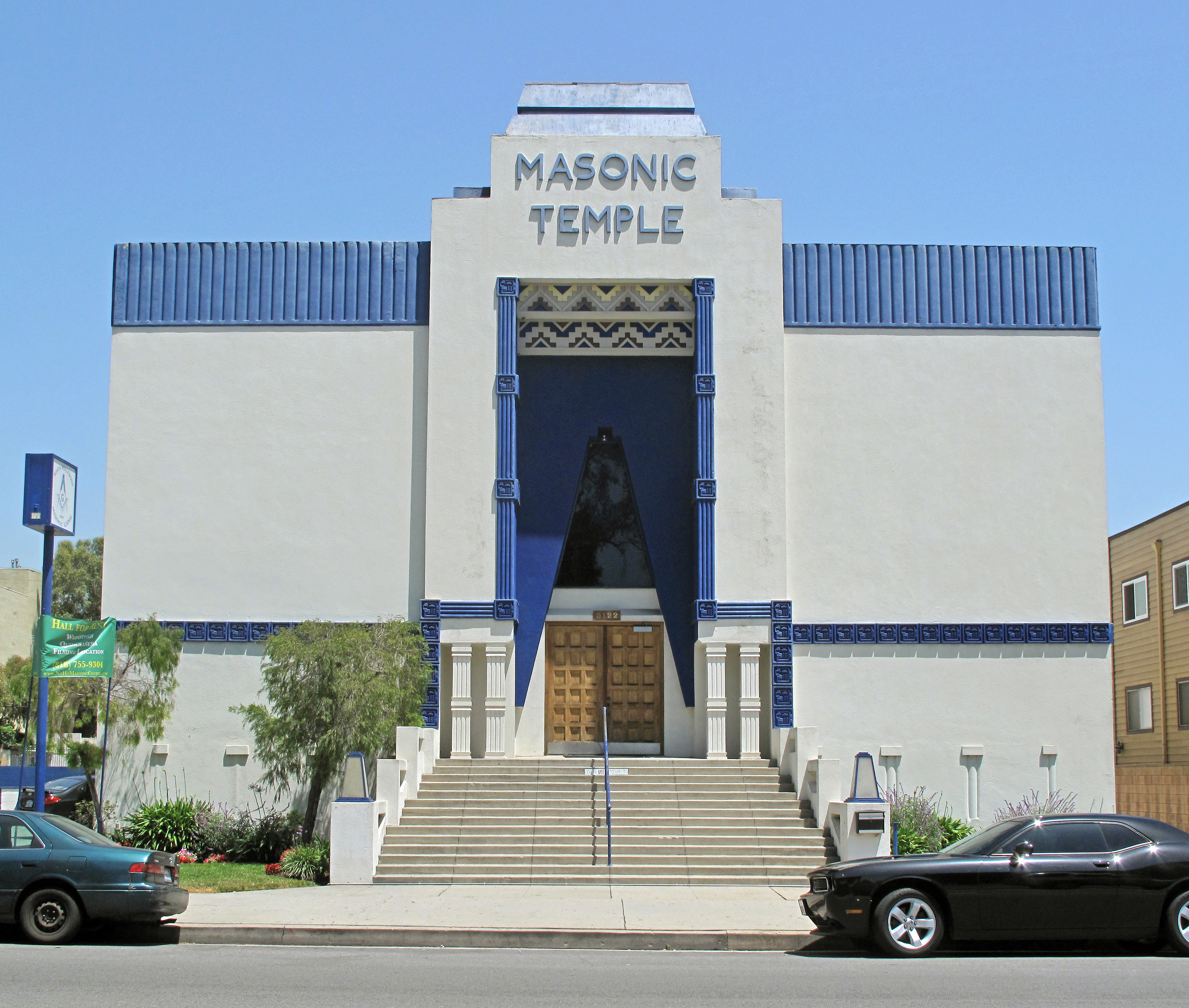
- The building in 2012
- Interactive map of the North Hollywood Masonic Temple area
- Alternative names: Masonic Lodge 542

General information
- Architectural style: Exotic Revival with elements of Mayan Revival and Art Moderne
- Location: 5122 Tujunga Avenue, North Hollywood, California
- Coordinates: 34.163°N 118.379°W
- Completed: 1949 or 1951

Design and construction
- Architects: Robert Stacy-Judd; John Aleck Murrey

Los Angeles Historic-Cultural Monument
- Designated: January 27, 2015
- Reference no.: 1078

North Hollywood Masonic Temple, also known as North Hollywood Masonic Lodge, is a historic former masonic temple located at 5122 Tujunga Avenue in the NoHo Arts District in North Hollywood, California. It was declared Los Angeles Cultural-Historic Monument #1078 in 2015.

== History ==
North Hollywood Masonic Temple was designed by Robert Stacy-Judd in association with John Aleck Murrey. Built in either 1949 or 1951 and featuring an Exotic Revival design with elements of Mayan Revival and Art Moderne, the building helped solidify Stacy-Judd's reputation as southern California’s most enthusiastic Mesoamerican-inspired architect.

Many Hollywood actors, executives, and studio employees held membership at this temple, including Clark Gable, John Wayne, the Warner brothers (Harry, Albert, Sam, and Jack), Stan Laurel, Oliver Hardy, and more. World War II Medal of Honor recipient turned actor Audie Murphy was also a member, and a room upstairs was dedicated to him.

In 2014, the freemasons moved out of the building and it was turned into an event space. In 2022, the masons officially marked the move as permanent.

In 2015, the City of Los Angeles designated the building Los Angeles Cultural-Historic Monument #1078. Only the exterior was included in this designation, as the interior has been irreversibly altered and no longer contributes to the historical significance of the building.

== Architecture and design ==
North Hollywood Masonic Temple features a Mesoamerican-inspired motif combined with Art Moderne to create a “thoroughly modern presence” and “a grandly scaled example of a Masonic lodge.” The building features a simple rectilinear plan with an elaborate front façade that consists of smooth white stucco walls punctuated by blue horizontal accents, a style that wraps around to the sides of the building. The main entrance features tall vertical elements and geometric motifs, all topped by a streamlined blue pyramid that evokes the temples of Palenque in Chiapas, Mexico. Integrity of the building exterior is considered excellent, while the interior has undergone irreversible alterations and is no longer considered historically significant.

Additional character-defining features of the building include: a centered and elevated entrance accessed by a flight of stairs, a faux-corbeled arch over the entrance, two colored friezes above the arch, geometric balustrade at the entrance stairs, fluted columns, repeating Mayan hieroglyph imprints, and a parapet wall running the circumference of the structure.

== See also ==
- List of Art Deco architecture in California § Los Angeles
