= Mayan Revival architecture =

1920s–1930s modern architectural style

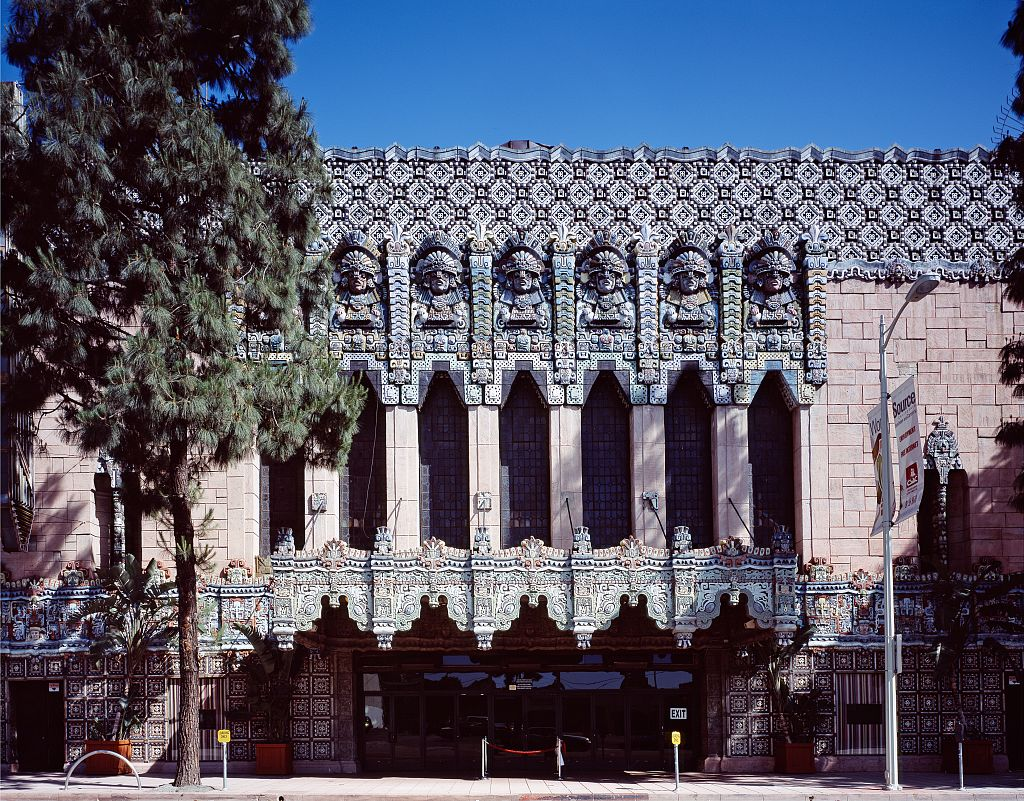
Mayan Theater, Los Angeles

Mayan Revival is a modern architectural style popular in the Americas during the 1920s and 1930s that drew inspiration from the architecture and iconography of pre-Columbian Mesoamerican cultures.

== History ==
=== Origins ===
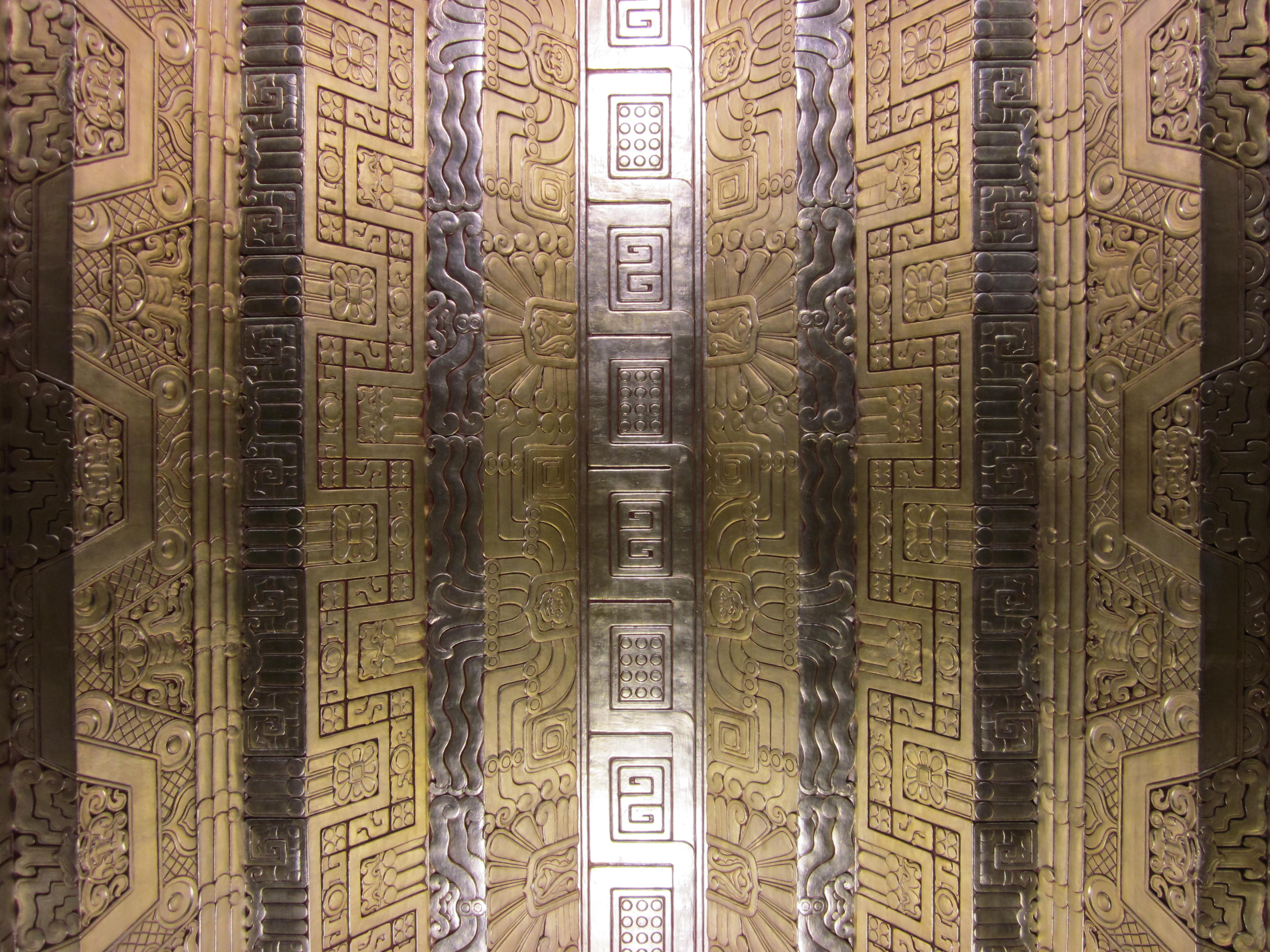
Detail of the intricate pattern work characteristic of classic Maya art, 450 Sutter Street.

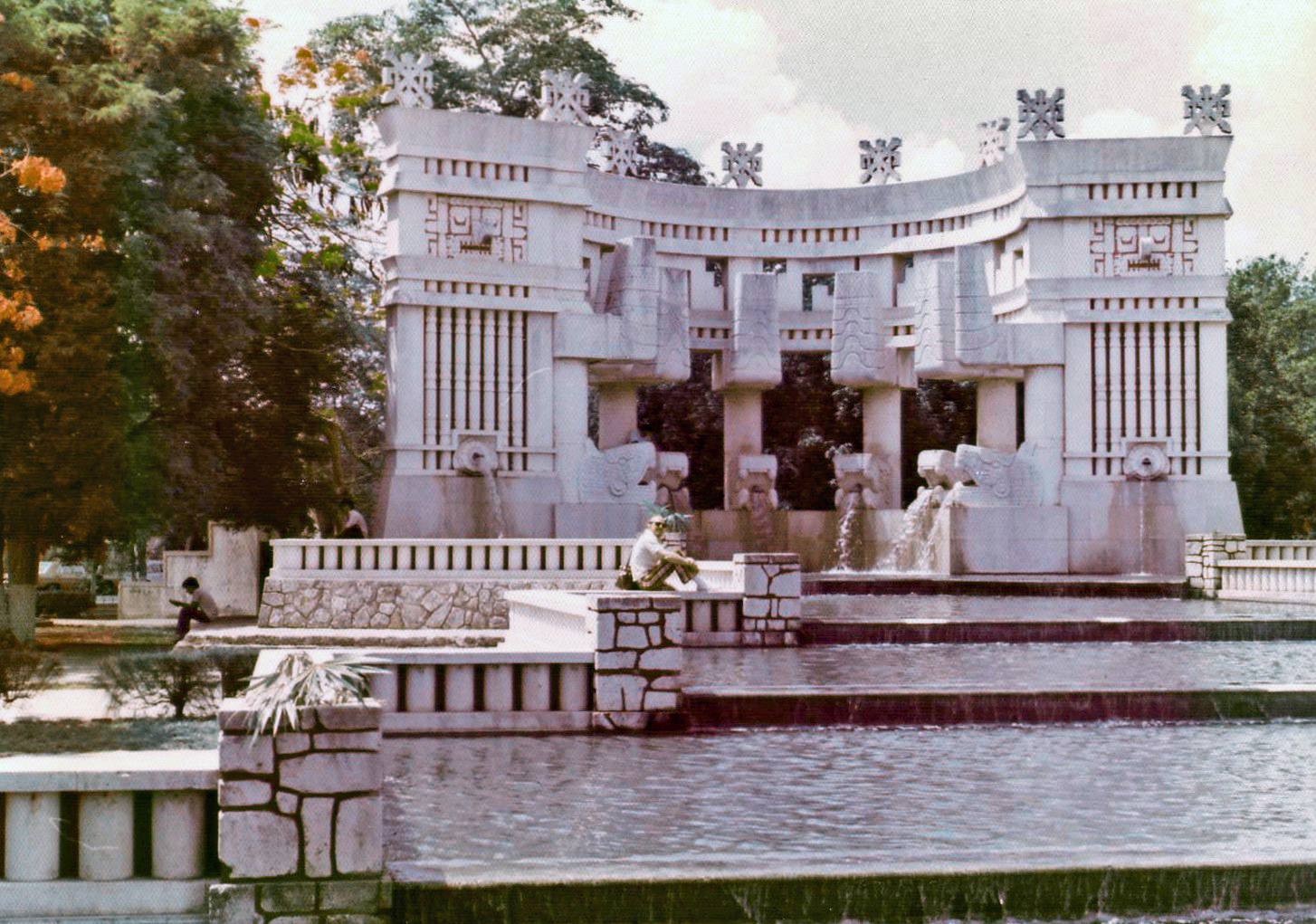
Kukulkanob public pavilion in Mérida.

Though the name of the style refers specifically to the Maya civilization of southern Mexico and Central America, in practice, this revivalist style frequently blends Maya architectural and artistic motifs "playful pilferings of the architectural and decorative elements" with those of other Mesoamerican cultures, particularly the Central Mexican Aztec architecture styling from the pre-contact period as exhibited by the Mexica and other Nahua groups. Although there were mutual influences between these original and otherwise distinct and richly varied pre-Columbian artistic traditions, the syncretism of these modern reproductions is often an ahistorical one.

Historian Marjorie Ingle traces the history of this style to the Pan American Union Building by Paul Philippe Cret which incorporates numerous motifs drawn from the indigenous traditions of the Americas. Maya and Mexica elements in the Pan American Union Building include the floor mosaics surrounding a central fountain (most of the motifs are copied directly from sculpture at Copan) and figures on lights flanking the entrance to the building. The building's Art Museum of the Americas contains numerous stoneware architectural details that are copied from Maya and Mexica art.

=== In the Art Deco period ===
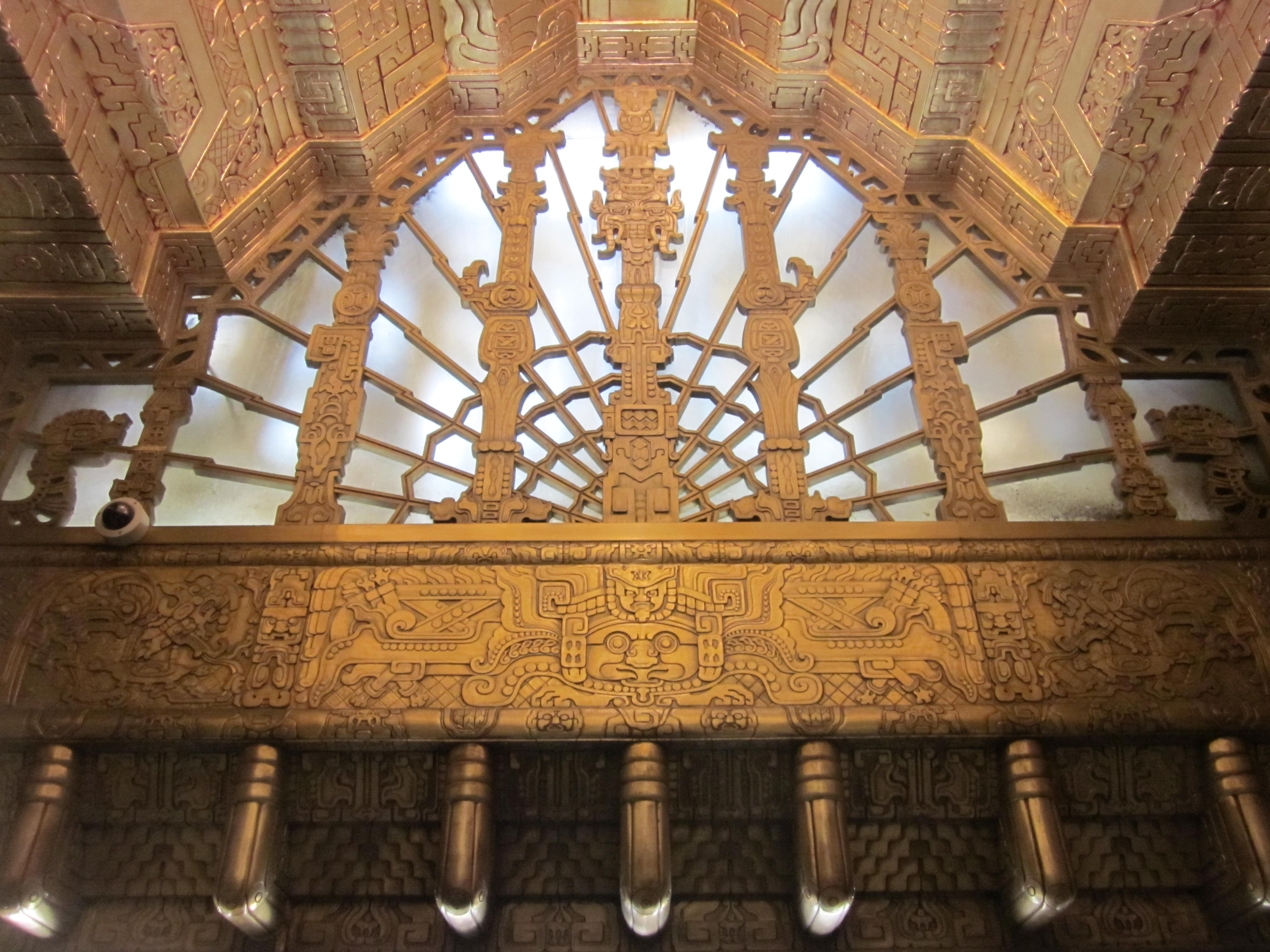
An example of Mayan decorative paneling, 450 Sutter Street.

Several prominent architects worked in this style, including Frank Lloyd Wright. Wright's Hollyhock House on Olive Hill in Los Angeles copied the shape of temples from Palenque, and the Imperial Hotel in Tokyo was in the shape of a Mesoamerican pyramid. His Ennis House, Millard House (La Miniatura), Storer House, and Freeman House in Los Angeles are built in his concrete textile block system, with bas reliefs and modular unit construction evoking the geometric patterning on the façades of Uxmal buildings.

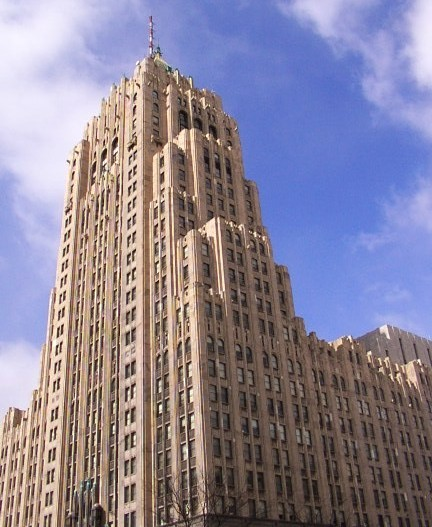
The Fisher Building in Detroit

Wright's son, landscape architect and architect Lloyd Wright, served as construction manager for three of his father's four textile block houses. He independently designed the Henry Bollman house in 1922 in the Sunset Square neighborhood in Hollywood and the iconic Mayan-modernist John Sowden House in 1926 in the Los Feliz District of Hollywood.

Wright's disciple Arata Endo constructed the Kōshien Hotel in the 1930s, heavily influenced by the architecture of the Imperial Hotel in Tokyo.

Commissioned in 1953, the massive pyramid of the Beth Sholom Synagogue with its geometric roof detailing is perhaps the most direct Wright evocation of Maya form.

== Prominent examples ==
Likely the most publicized example of Mayan Revival was Robert Stacy-Judd's Aztec Hotel of 1924–1925. Its façade, interiors and furniture incorporated abstract patterns inspired by the Maya script with Art Deco influences, and it was built on the original U.S. Route 66 in Monrovia, California.

Stacy-Judd was directly influenced by John Lloyd Stephens writings, and perhaps even more so by the illustrations by Frederick Catherwood as presented in their book Incidents of Travel in Central America, Chiapas and Yucatan, a work that introduced many to the wondrous ruins of Central America. In it Stacy-Judd explains the choice of the name of the hotel: "When the hotel project was first announced, the word Maya was unknown to the layman. The subject of Maya culture was only of archaeological importance, a, at that, concerned but a few exponents. As a word Aztec was fairly well known, I baptized the hotel with that name, although all the decorative motifs are Maya." Although the buildings use of reinforced concrete to create the intricate designs on the exterior one opinionated observer wrote: "The bizarre Aztec forms may create the atmosphere desired, and will serve the legitimate publicity interests of the establishment, but it would be deplorable if an 'Aztec Movement' set in and the style copyists were diverted from noble examples to the forms of a semi-barbaric people."

Other prominent buildings in this style include:

- the Henry Bollman House in Los Angeles by Lloyd Wright, 1922
- the Aurora Elks Lodge in Aurora, Illinois, 1926
- the Mayan Theater in Los Angeles by Stiles O. Clements, 1927
- the Petroleum Building, Houston, by the Anglo-American architect Alfred Bossom, a notable proponent of Mayan Revival, 1927
- the Casino Club building in San Antonio, Texas, 1927.
- and the Fisher Theater by Albert Kahn in Detroit, 1928
- the Guardian Building by Wirt C. Rowland of Smith Hinchman & Grylls, 1928–1929
- 450 Sutter Street in San Francisco by Timothy L. Pflueger, 1929
- United Office Building in Niagara Falls, New York by James A. Johnson of Esenwein & Johnson, 1929
- the Mayan Theater in Denver by Montana Fallis, 1929–1930
- the Storer House in the Hollywood Hills neighborhood of Los Angeles, by Frank Lloyd Wright, 1923
- the Lincoln Theater in Marion, Virginia. 1929
- the Berkeley Public Library, 1934
- the Hall of Waters in Excelsior Springs, Missouri, 1937. National Register of Historic Places.
- Art and History Museums—Maitland Art Center, Maitland, FL, 1938. Winter artist colony designed by J. Andre Smith. National Historic Landmark
Frank Lloyd Wright structures

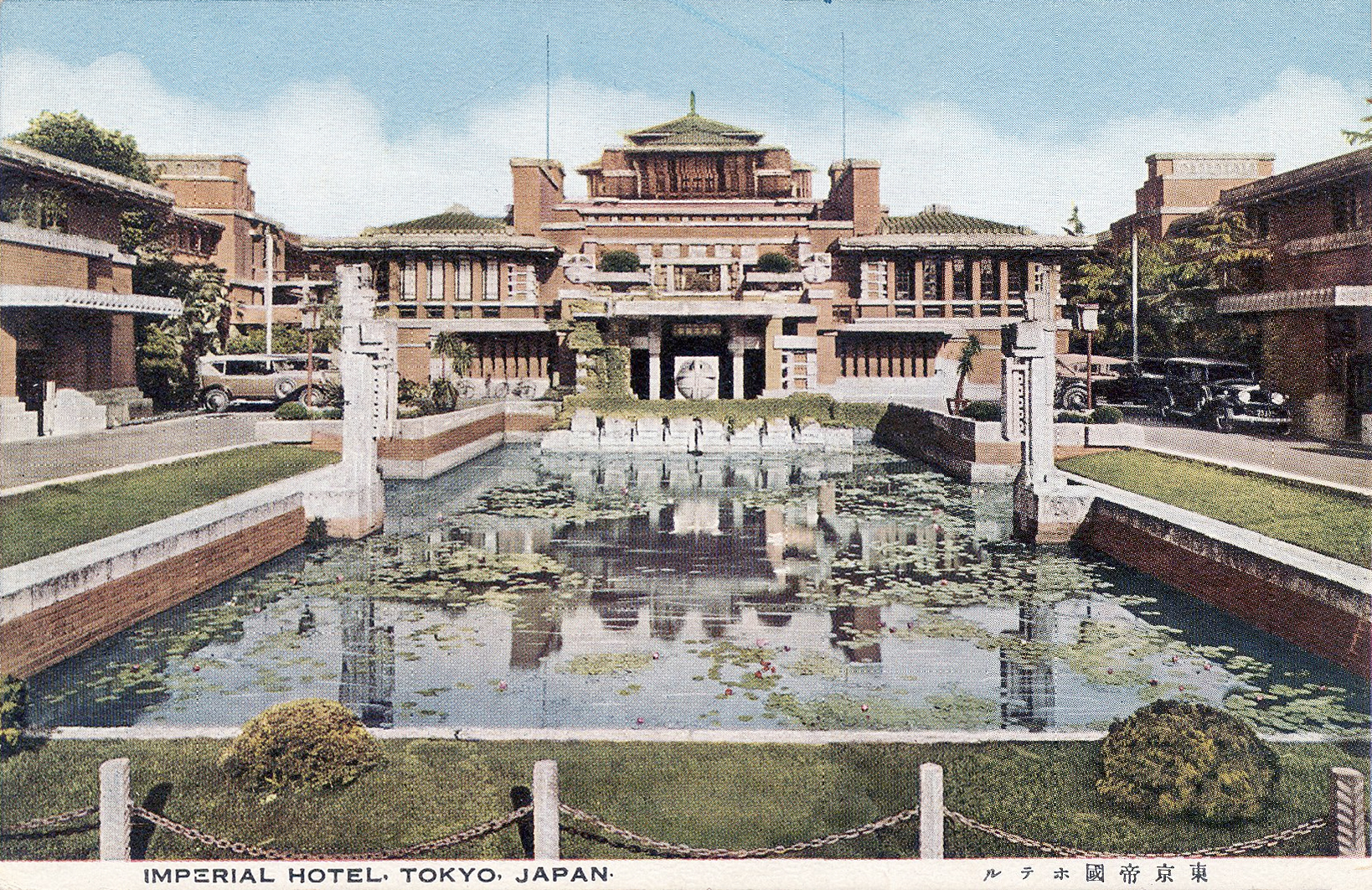
Imperial Hotel, Tokyo, Japan

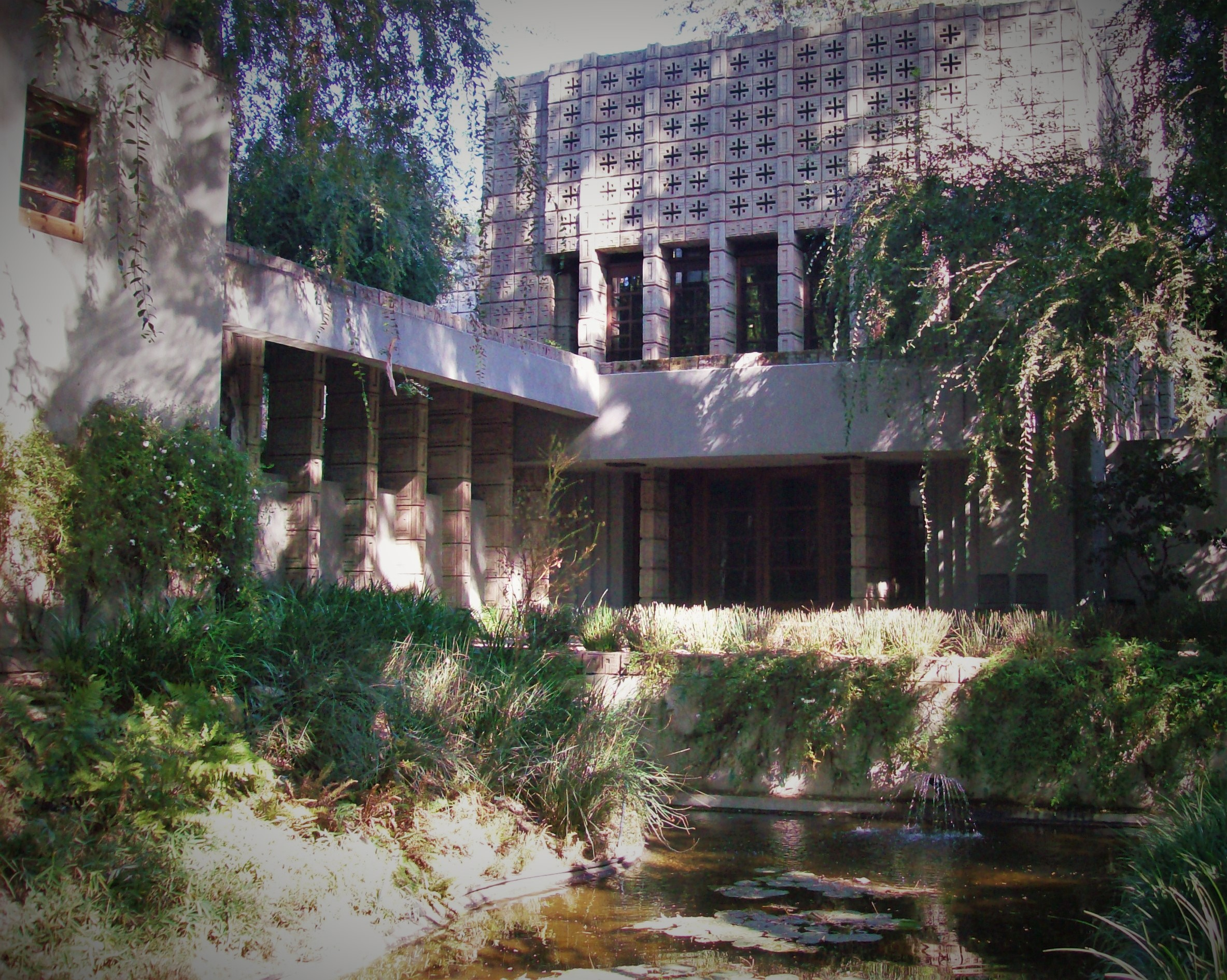
Millard House in Pasadena, United States

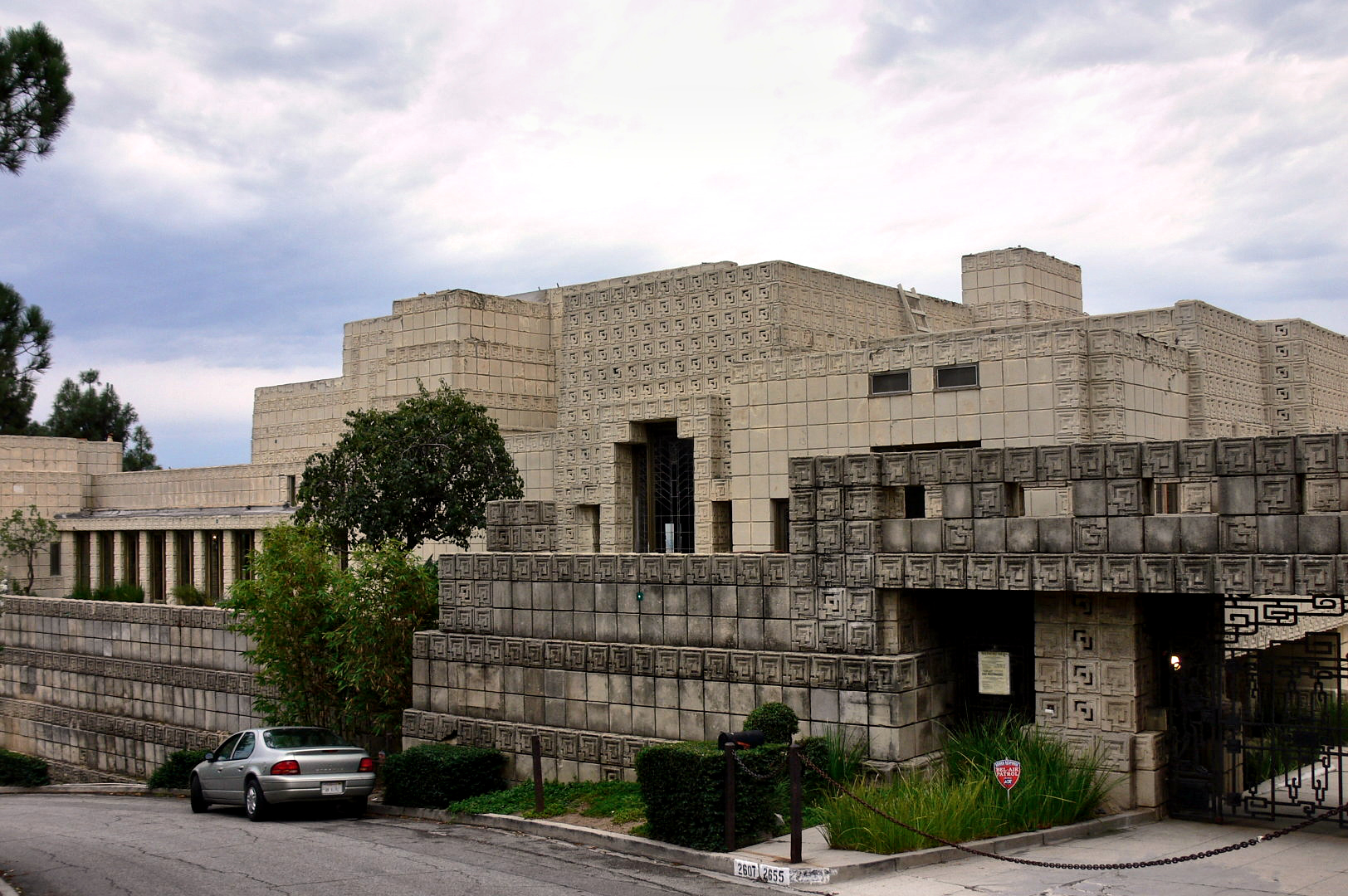
Ennis House in Los Angeles, United States

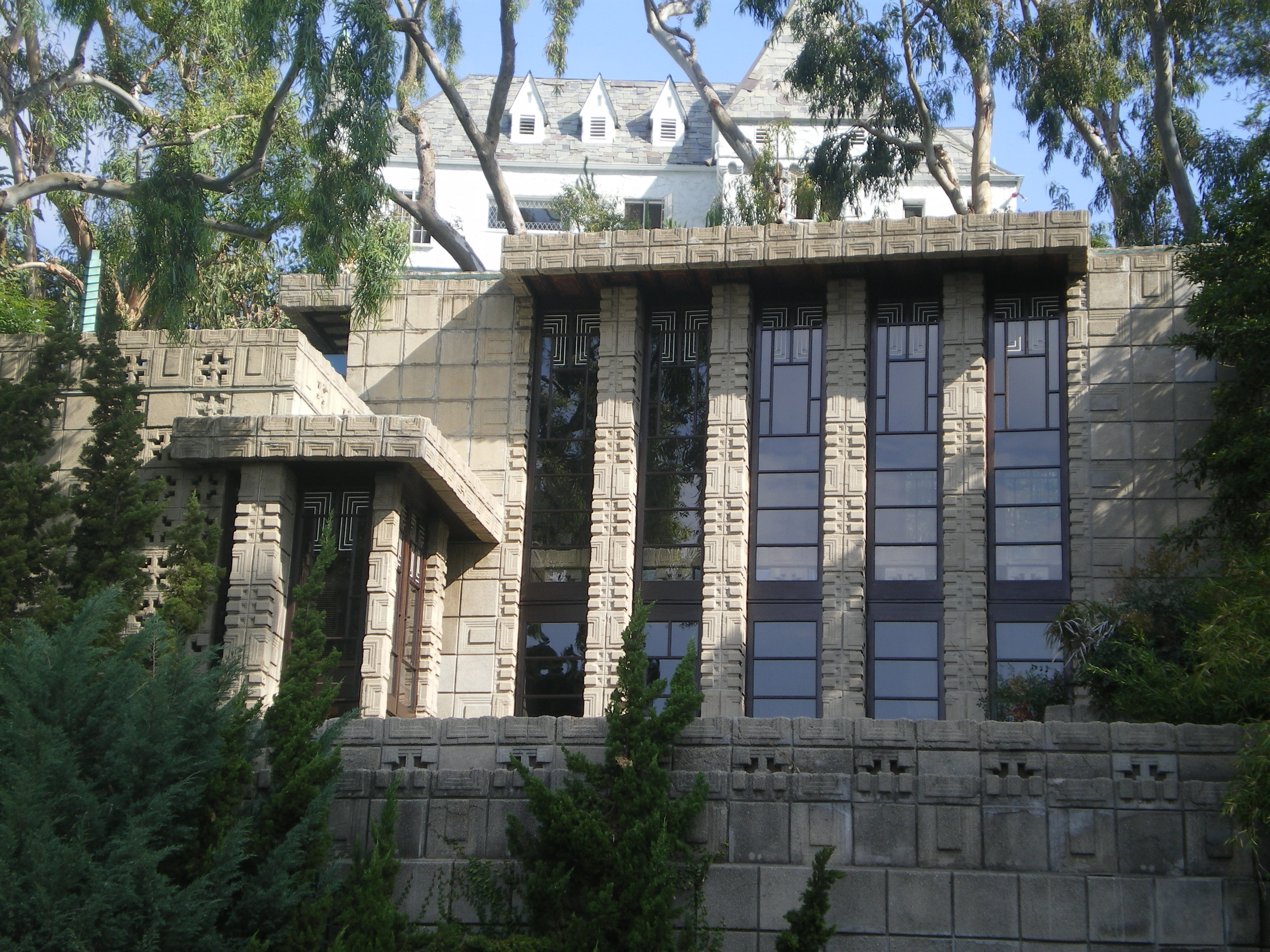
Storer House in Los Angeles, United States
Structures by other architects

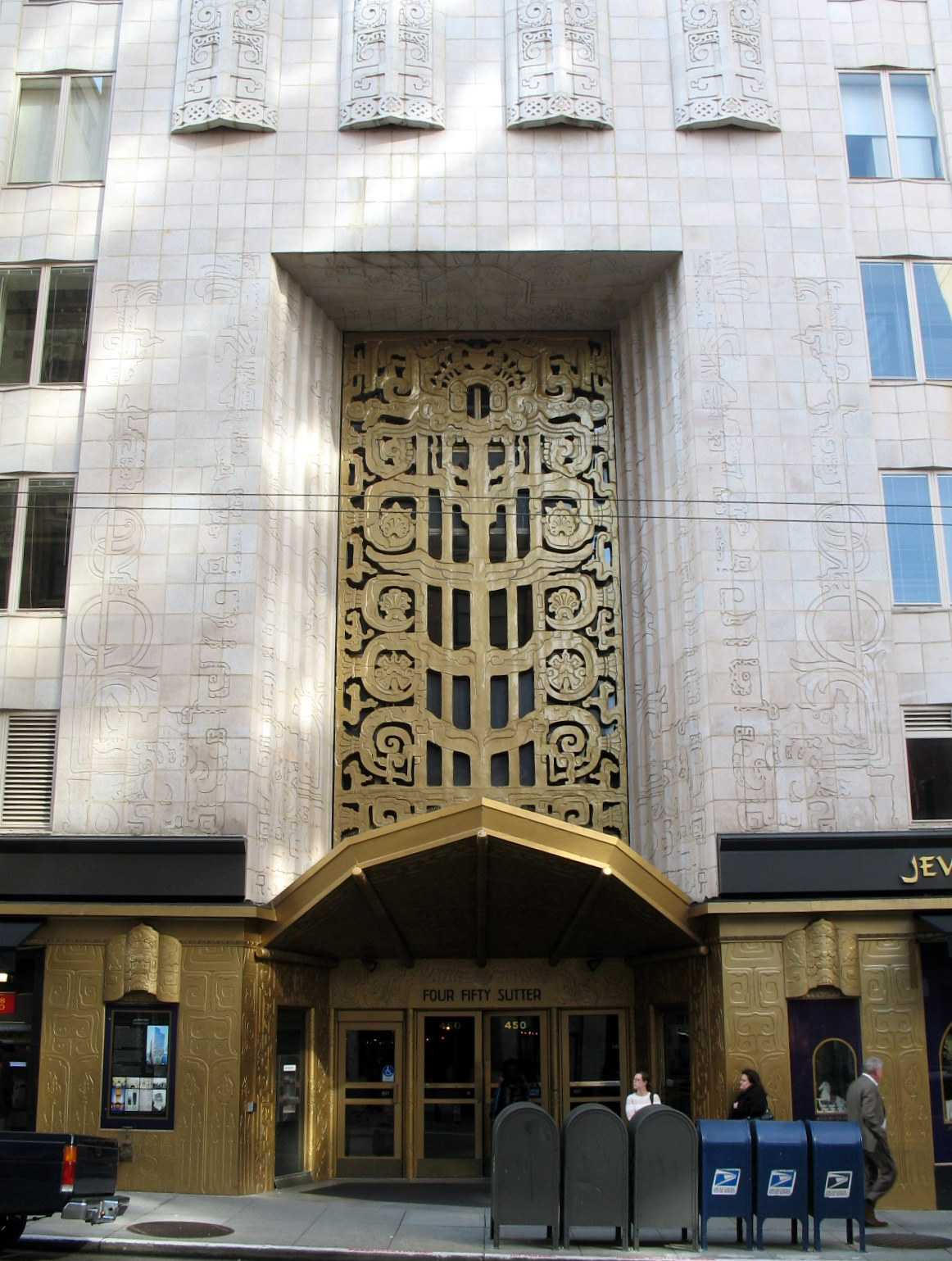
Entrance of 450 Sutter Street, San Francisco, United States

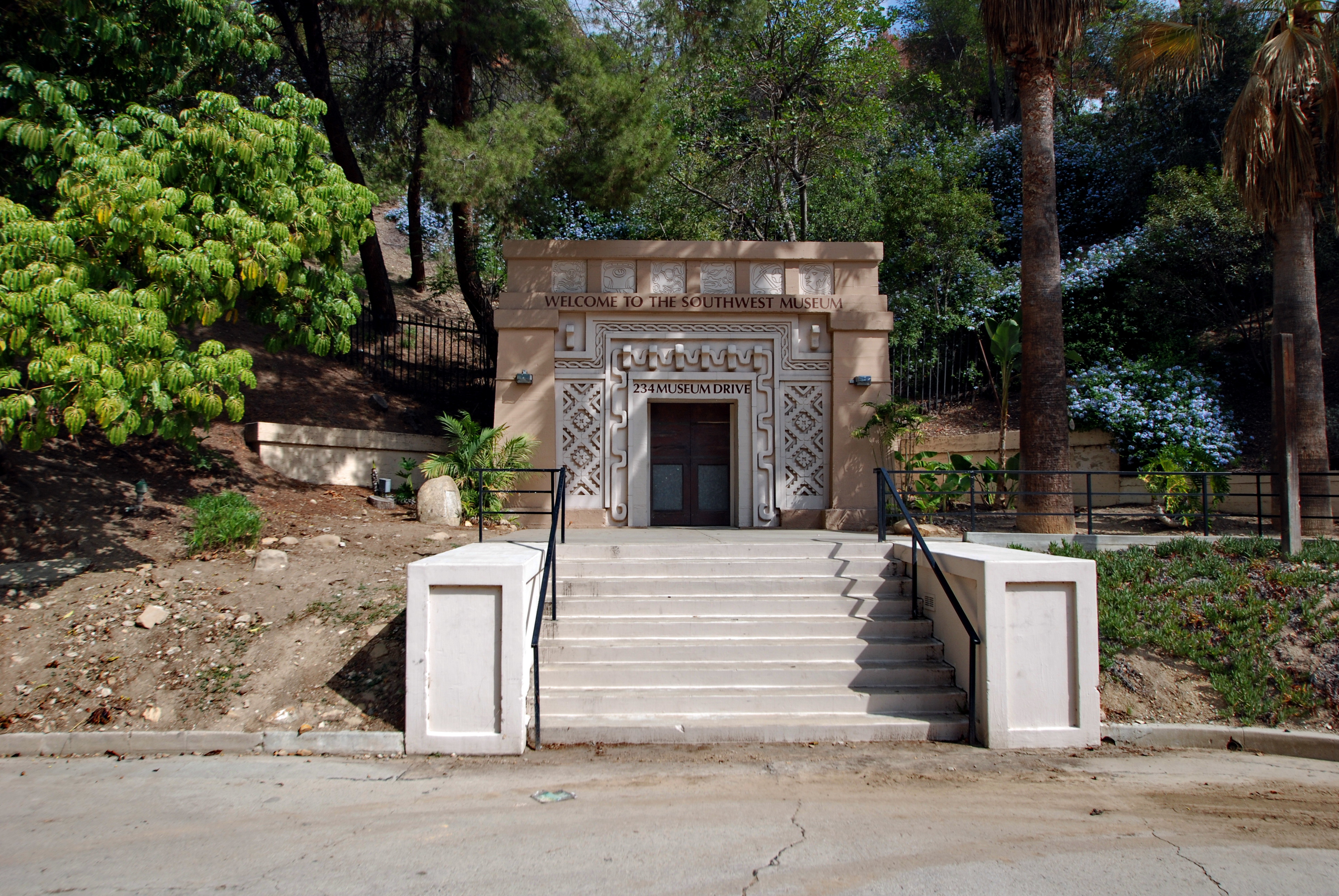
Mayan Revival entrance to the Southwest Museum (a primarily Mission Revival complex) in Los Angeles, United States, incorporating elements from Chenes and Puuc architecture.

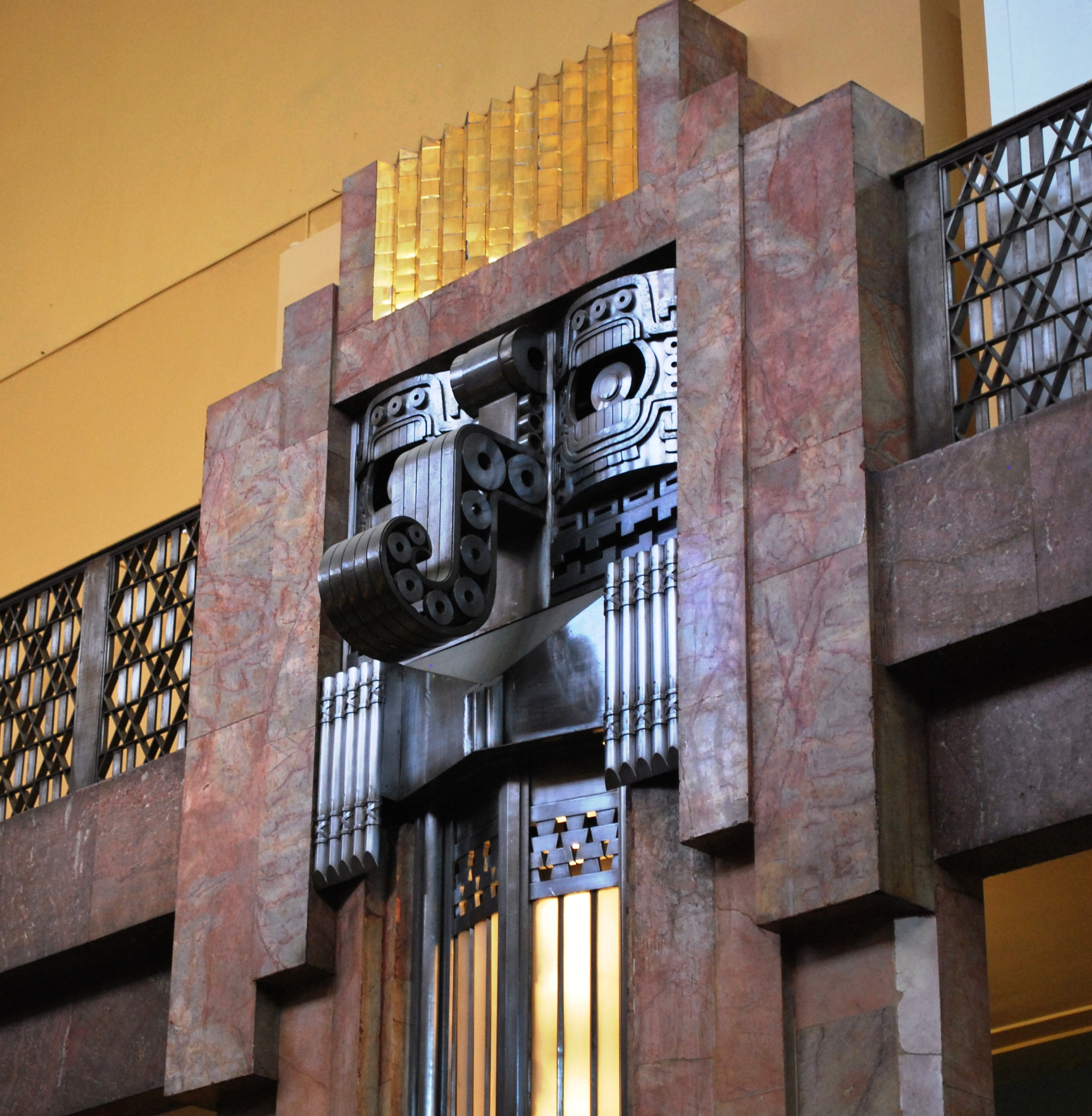
A pillar featuring the Maya rain god Chaac in the Art Deco interior of the Palacio de Bellas Artes, Mexico City.

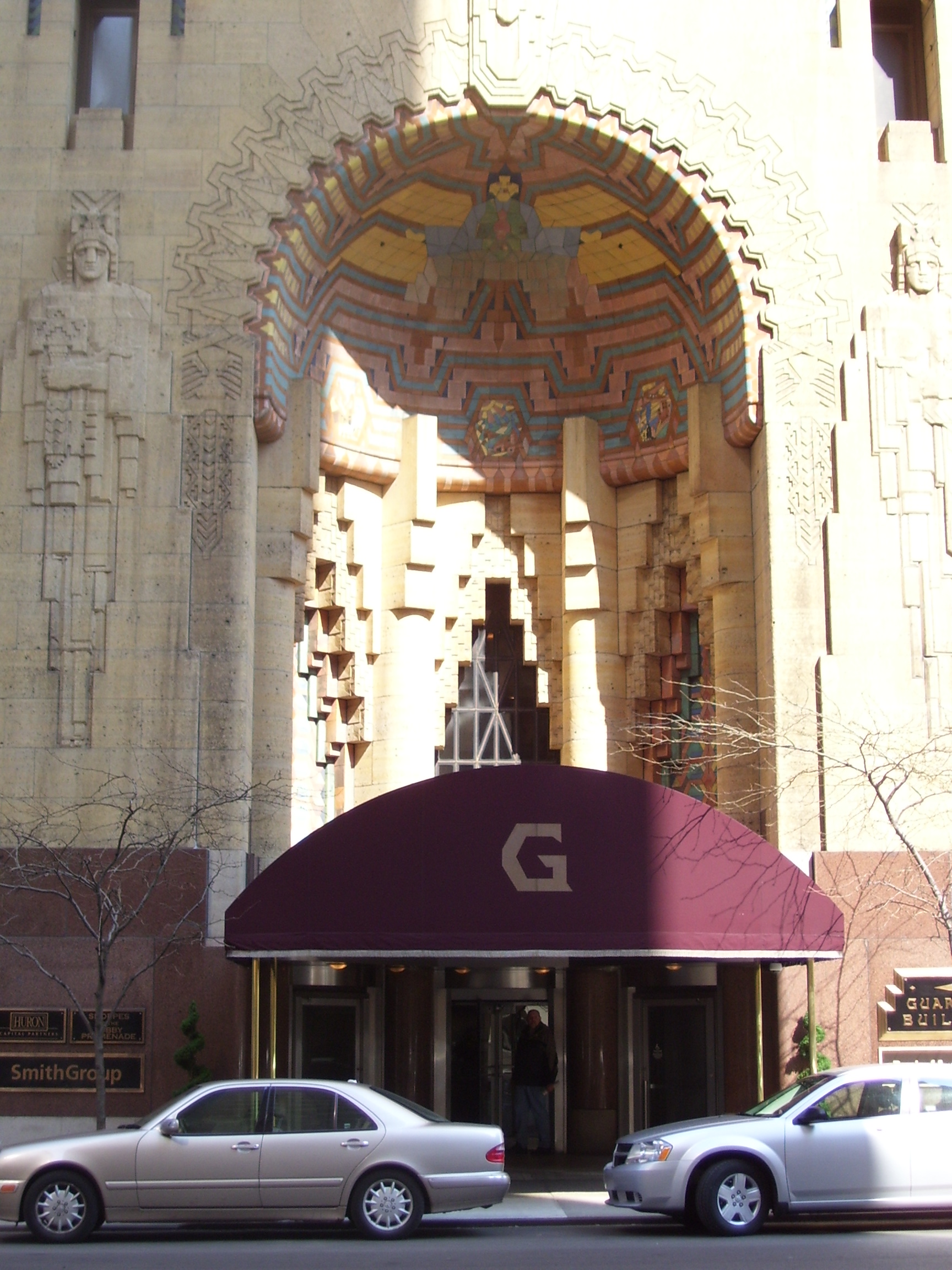
The Guardian building in Detroit, United States

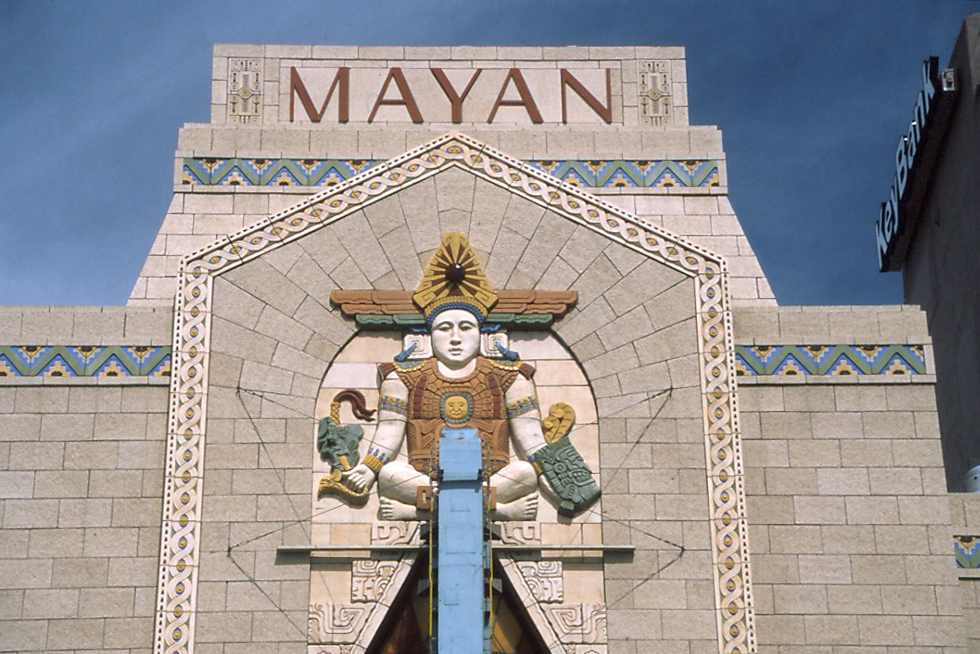
The Mayan Theatre in Denver, Colorado, United States dates from the 1930s

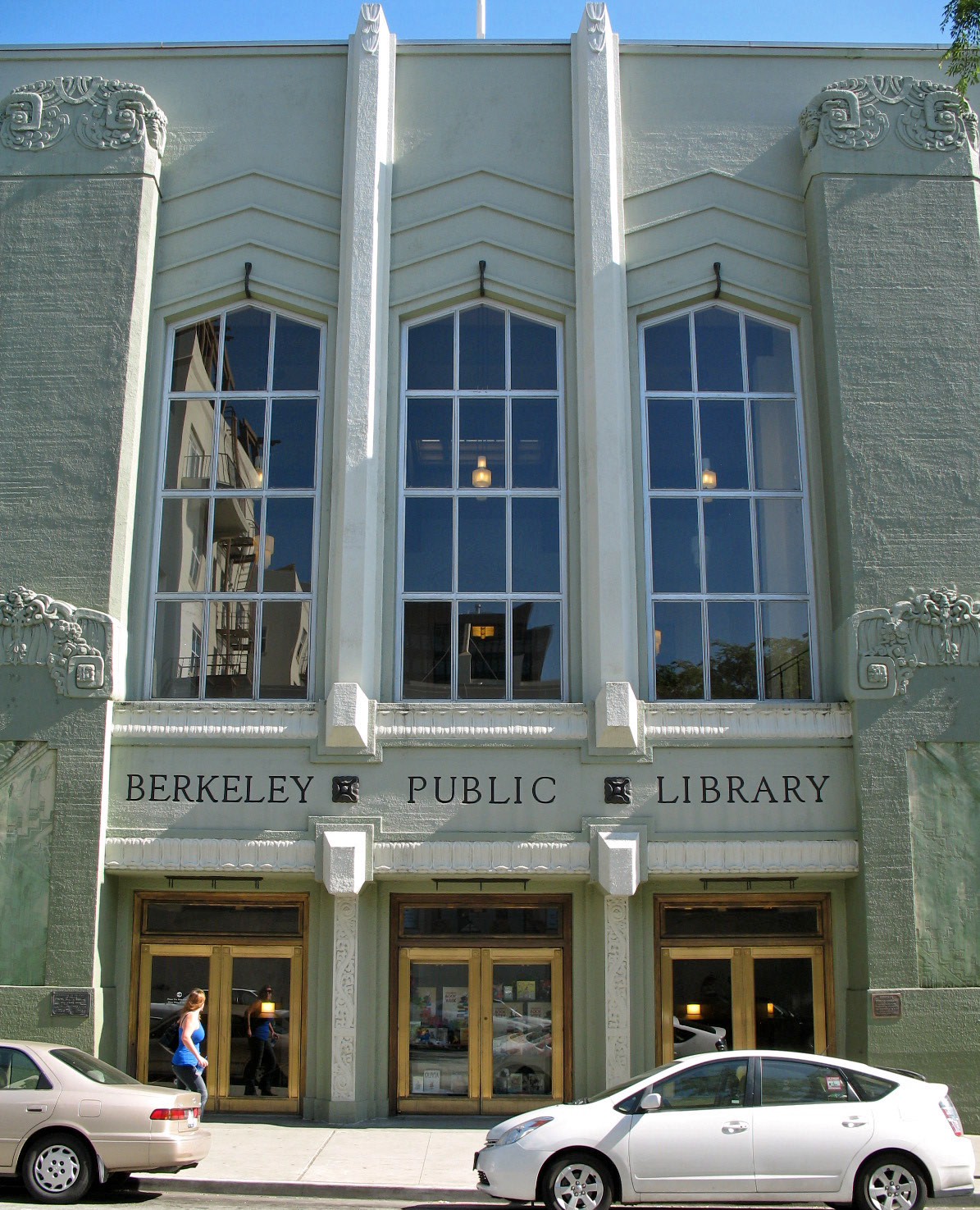
The Berkeley Public Library on Shattuck Ave in Berkeley, United States

== See also ==
- Art Deco of the 20s and 30s
- Art Deco Architecture: Design, Decoration and Detail from the Twenties and Thirties
- Mesoamerican architecture
- Maya art
- México City México Temple
- Neo-Andean

== Bibliography ==
- Barrett, John. "The Pan American Union: Peace, Friendship, Commerce." Washington, D.C.: Pan American Union. 1911
- Braun, Barbara. Pre-Columbian Art and the Post-Columbian World: Ancient American Sources of Modern Art. New York. Harry N. Abrams. 1993.
- Gebhard, David and Peres, Anthony. Robert Stacy-Judd: Maya Architecture and the Creation of a New Style. Capra Press. 1993.
- Ingle, Marjorie I. The Mayan Revival Style: Art Deco Mayan Fantasy. University of New Mexico Press. 1989.
- Lerner, Jesse. The Maya of Modernism: Art, Architecture, and Film. Albuquerque: University of New Mexico Press, 2011.
- Phillips, Ruth Anne. Pre-Columbian Revival': Defining and Exploring a U.S. Architectural Style, 1910-1940. Ph.D. diss. (New York: City University of New York, 2007).
- Stacy-Judd, Robert B. Atlantis: Mother of Empires. Los Angeles. De Vorse & Co. 1939
- Stacy-Judd, Robert B. The Ancient Mayas, Adventures In the Jungles of Yucatan. Los Angeles. Haskell-Travers, Inc. 1934
- Stacy-Judd, Robert B. A Maya Manuscript. Los Angeles. Philosophical Research Society. 1940.
- Willard, T. A., The City of the Sacred Well, Being a Narrative of the Discoveries and Excavations of Edward Herbert Thompson in the Ancient City of Chi-chen Itza With Some Discourse on the Culture and Development of the Mayan Civilization as Revealed by Their Art and Architecture, Here Set Down and Illustrated From Photographs. New York. Century Co. 1926
