= Aztec Hotel =

- U.S. National Register of Historic Places
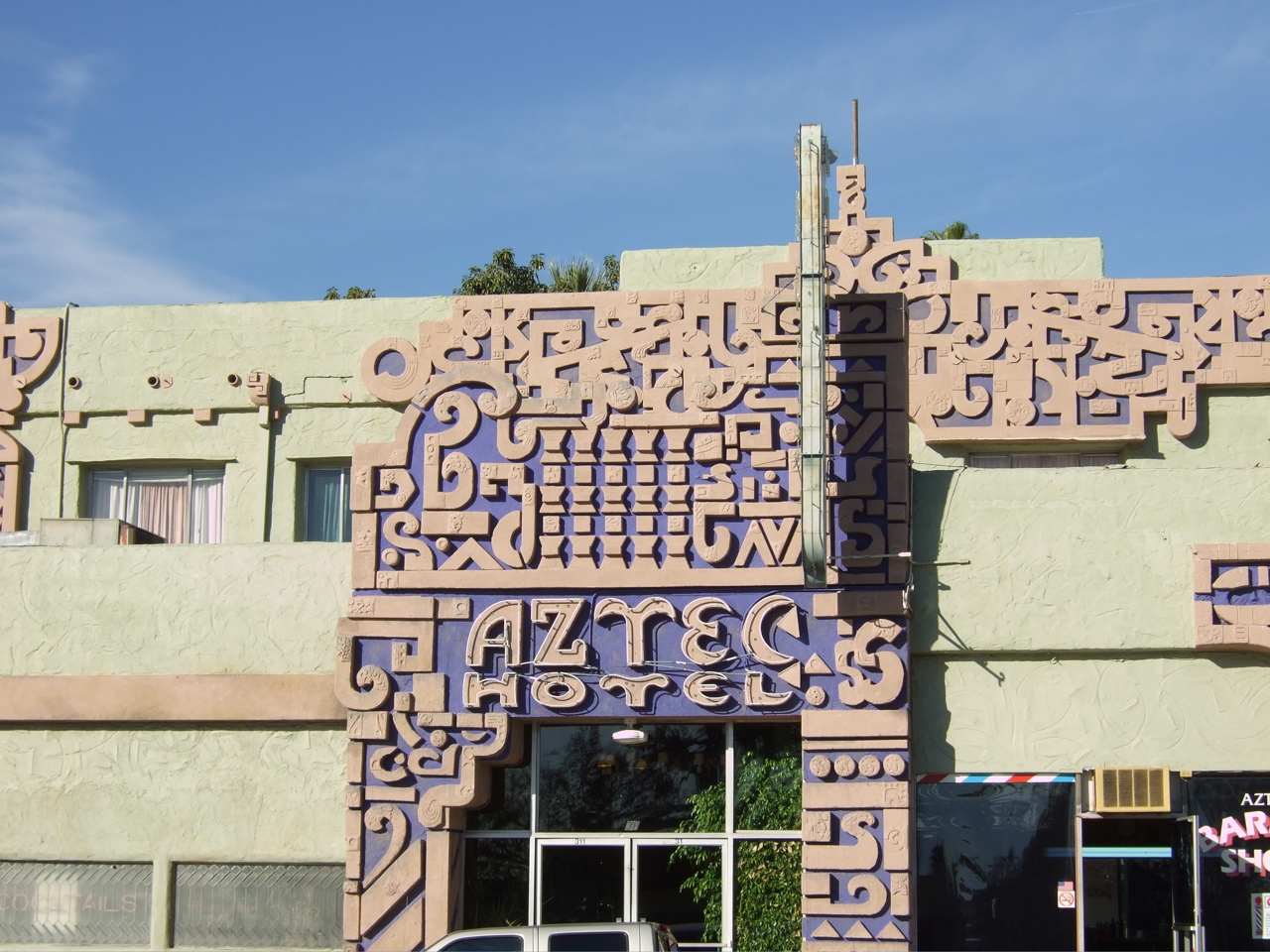
- Part of the facade of the hotel

- Location within the Los Angeles metropolitan area Location within California Location within the United States
- Location: 311 W. Foothill Blvd., Monrovia, California
- Coordinates: 34°9′6″N 118°0′18″W
- Built: 1924
- Architect: Robert Stacy-Judd
- Architectural style: Mayan Revival
- NRHP reference No.: 78000691
- Added to NRHP: May 22, 1978

The Aztec Hotel is a historical landmark building in Monrovia, in the San Gabriel Valley, California. The hotel is an example of Mayan Revival architecture still in existence. It was designed by architect Robert Stacy-Judd, and built on U.S. Route 66 in 1925–26. The hotel opened to the public in September 1925, and contained over 40 rooms.

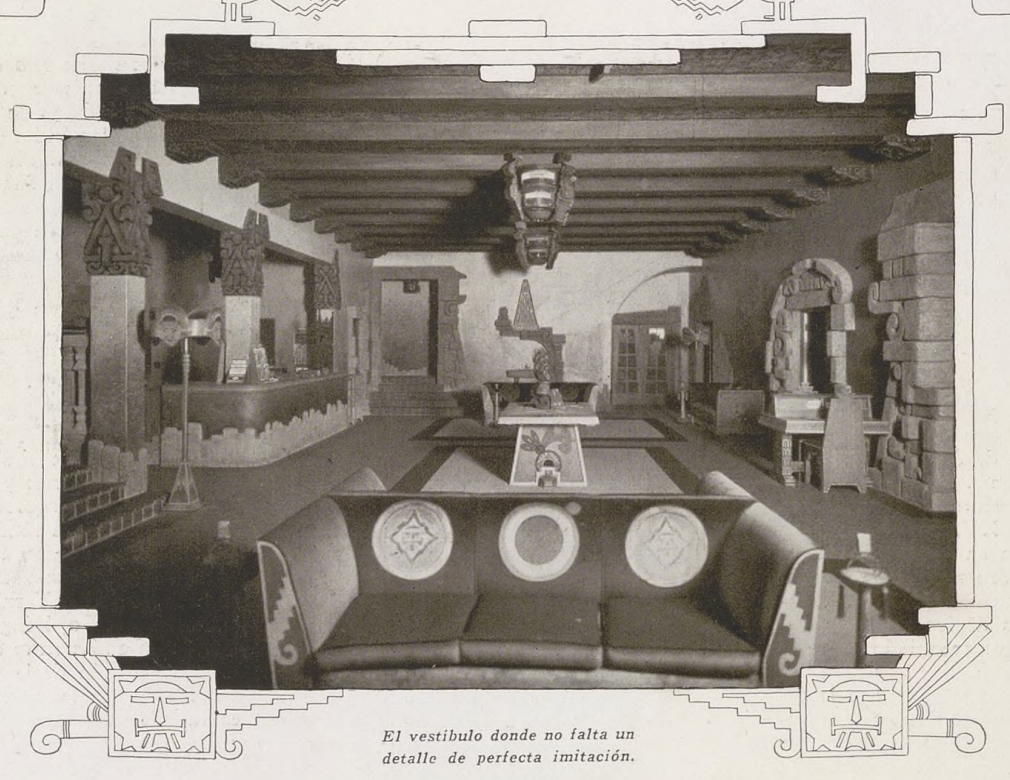
Lobby of the Aztec Hotel in the Argentina magazine Plus Ultra, May 1928.

The hotel has a revivalist style that mixes an abstraction from Maya architecture sources along with art deco and Spanish Colonial Revival architecture.

The Aztec Hotel was designated a National Historic Landmark and listed on the National Register of Historic Places in 1978. The hotel's owners began restoration to preserve as much of the original ornamentation as possible in 2000 under the National Park Service's Route 66 Corridor Preservation Program. Kathie Reece-McNeill undertook a renovation of the Aztec Hotel between 2000–2005. She utilized funds and expertise provided by the State of California Office of Historic Preservation and the National Route 66 Foundation. Project Manager Glen Duncan and Historic Architect Joe Catalano worked on the renovation.

The hotel was featured in the 2009 romantic comedy Spooner. Scenes were filmed in front of the hotel as well as many interior scenes showing the lobby, bar, hallways and inside one of the rooms.

The Aztec Hotel has been reputed to be haunted for decades. San Gabriel Valley in Time notes "The Aztec Hotel has gained notoriety for being one of the most haunted places in the San Gabriel Valley. These reported stories have helped increase the lure of the Hotel and its history."

The hotel was closed for renovations in 2012. As of 2021, the Aztec Hotel remained closed with the opening date still unknown.

As of July 31, 2025, the Aztec Hotel was for sale with an asking price of $15 million.
