= Malinalco (archeological site) =

Cuauhtinchan
- Location within Mesoamerica
- 18°57′12″N 99°30′11″W
- Periods: Late Preclassic to Late Classic
- Location: Malinalco, Mexico, Mexico
- Region: Mexico State

Cuauhtinchan Archeological Zone or Malinalco Archeological Zone, located just west of the town center on a hill called Cerro de los Idolos, which rises 215 meters above the town. On its sides are a number of pre-Hispanic structures built on terraces built into the hill. The main structures are at the top. This is one of the most important Aztec sites and was discovered in 1933, and explored by José García Payón in 1935. The visible complex dates from the Aztec Empire but the site's use as a ceremonial center appears to be much older. The sanctuary complex was built from the mid 15th century to the beginnings of the 16th. To get to the Cerro de los Idolos one must climb 426 stairs up 125 meters. Along the stairway leading to the site, there are signs with area's history written in Spanish, English and Nahuatl. The site contains six buildings. The Cuauhcalli or House of the Eagles, which dates from 1501, is the main building, which is significant in that it is carved out of the hill itself. The building is in the shape of a truncated pyramid, built this way due to the lack of space on the hill. The monolithic Cuauhcalli has been compared to the Ellora in India, Petra on the shores of the Dead Sea and Abu Simbel in Egypt. This was a sanctuary for the Eagle Warriors for rites such as initiation. A thirteen-step staircase leading into this temple is flanked by side struts. and two feline sculptures that face the plaza in front. The Cuauhcalli consists of two rooms, one rectangular and the other circular, with an opening in the wall between the two. After being carved out of the rock, the walls and ceiling were covered in stucco and painted with murals, most of which are almost completely gone. In the upper part, the entrance is symbolized by the open jaws of a serpent, complete with fangs, eyes and a forked tongue, which was painted red. This upper portion is covered by a thatched roof of the grass the area is named for.

== Architecture ==
Just inside of the entrance, on the east side, there is a sculpture of a serpent's head on which rests the remains of a statue of an Eagle Warrior. To the west, there is another sculpture in the shape of a large pedestal, symbolizing a tlapanhuéhuetl (war drum). Above this is a sculpture of a cipactli, which is a primeval being, occasionally called a “monster of the earth.” The cipactli is holding up a person, of which only the sandals remain. It is thought the two statues functioned as standards. Further inside is a bench that surrounds a space similar to a hemicycle. The horseshoe bench has four sculptures, the most outstanding one being an eagle that faces the entrance. Two others are also of eagles while the fourth is a jaguar. The jaguar statue has its skin spread out as if it were a mounted trophy. Behind the eagles there is a cuauhxicalli or sacred vessel in which to put the hearts of sacrifice victims, who then turn into messengers of the sun. The orientation of the building relates to the movement of the stars. Before it was covered with a thatched roof to preserve it, openings in the walls provoked light phenomena at certain times such as at the summer solstice.

From here was found a large wooden huéhuetl or ceremonial war drum, which is now in the Museum of Anthropology and History in the Mexiquense Cultural Center in Toluca. At the spring and fall equinoxes some 5,000 to 7,000 people visit the site. The conical thatched roof that covers the main building is a reproduction of the kind of roof it probably had in antiquity, but the shed-like porch is less faithful to the original. Despite acts of vandalism, the interior of this building is still in good condition.

== Cuauhtinchan ==
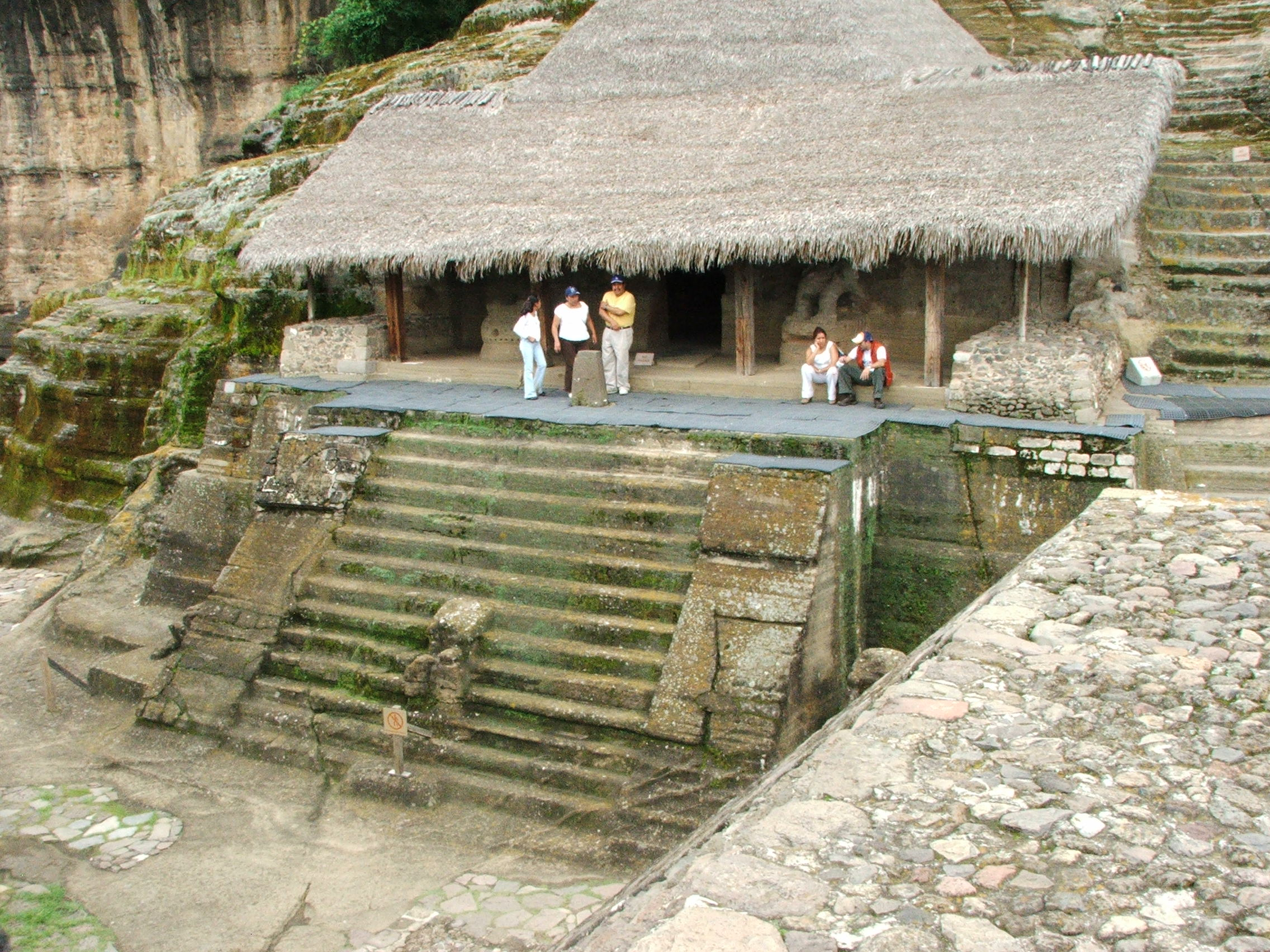

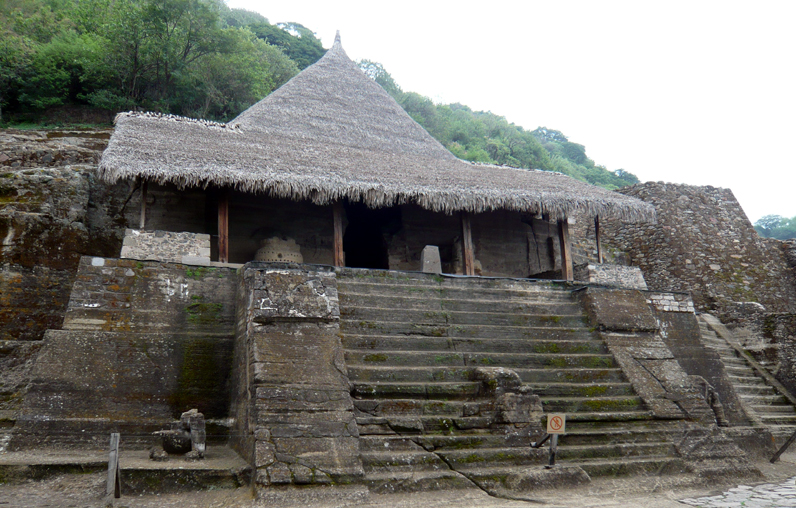

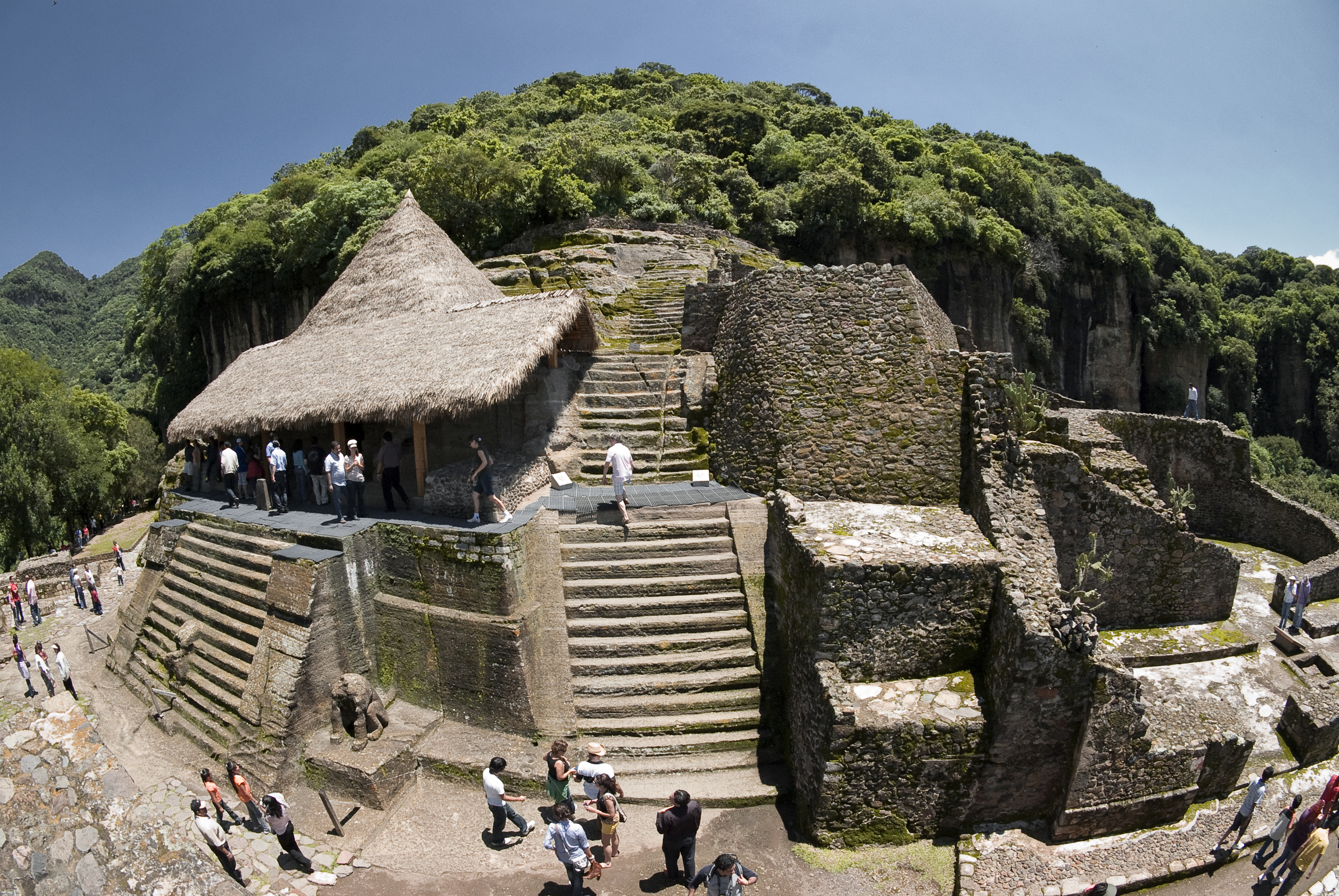

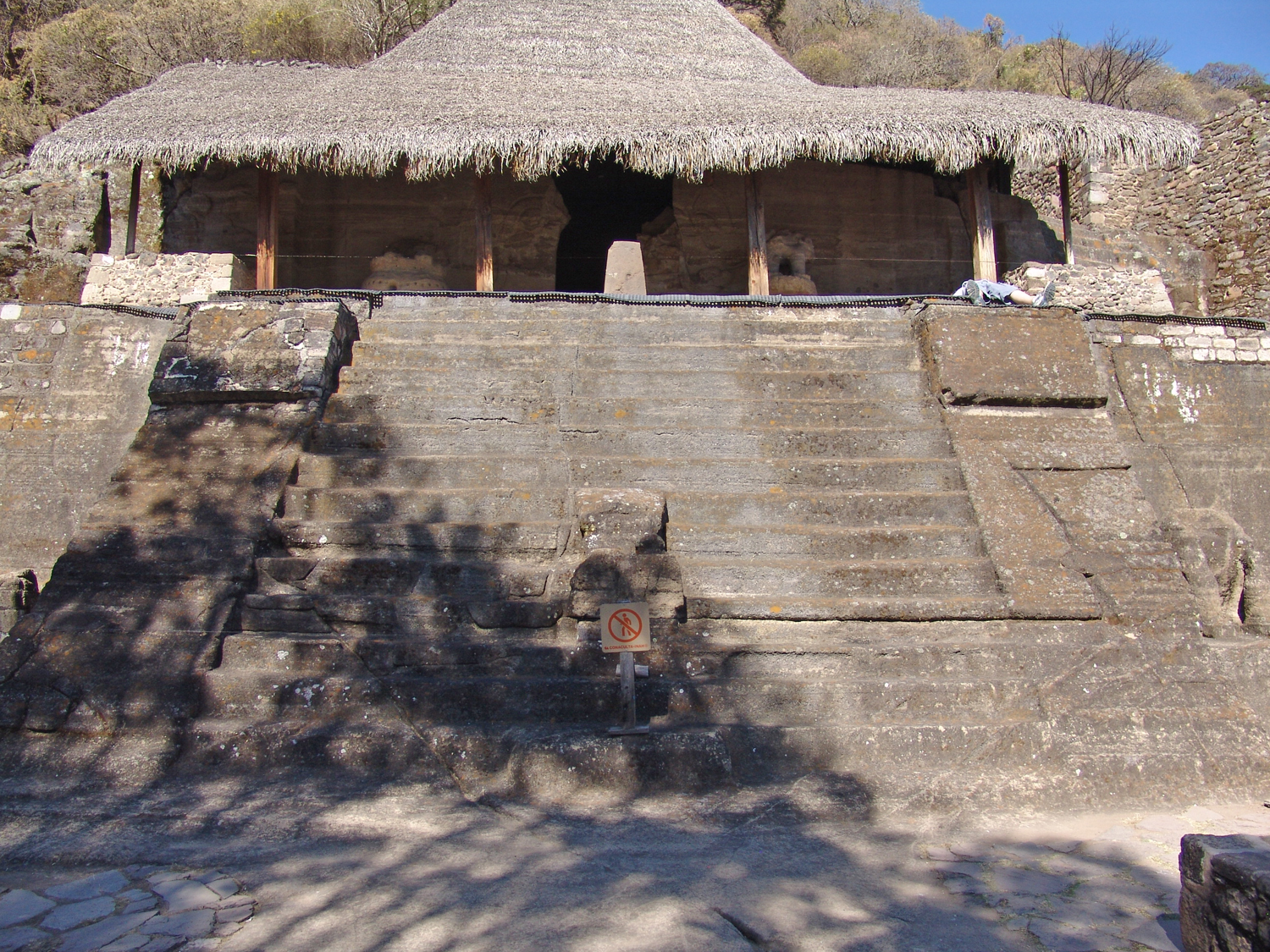

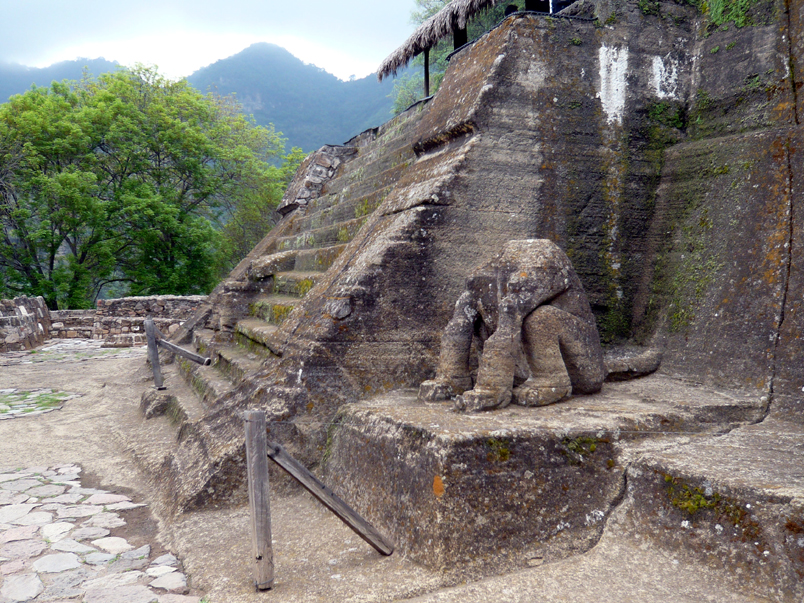

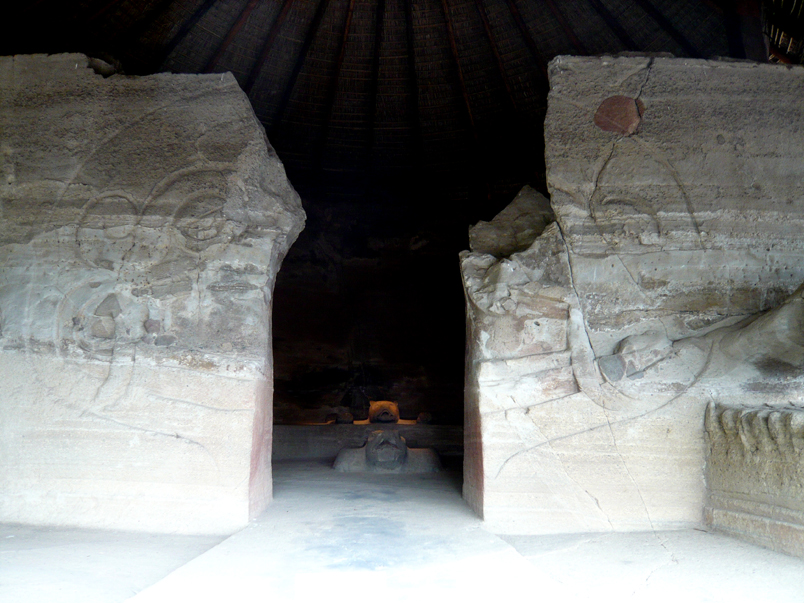

== See also ==
- Teotenango
- Xochicalco
