= Aztec architecture =

Structural remains of the Aztec civilization

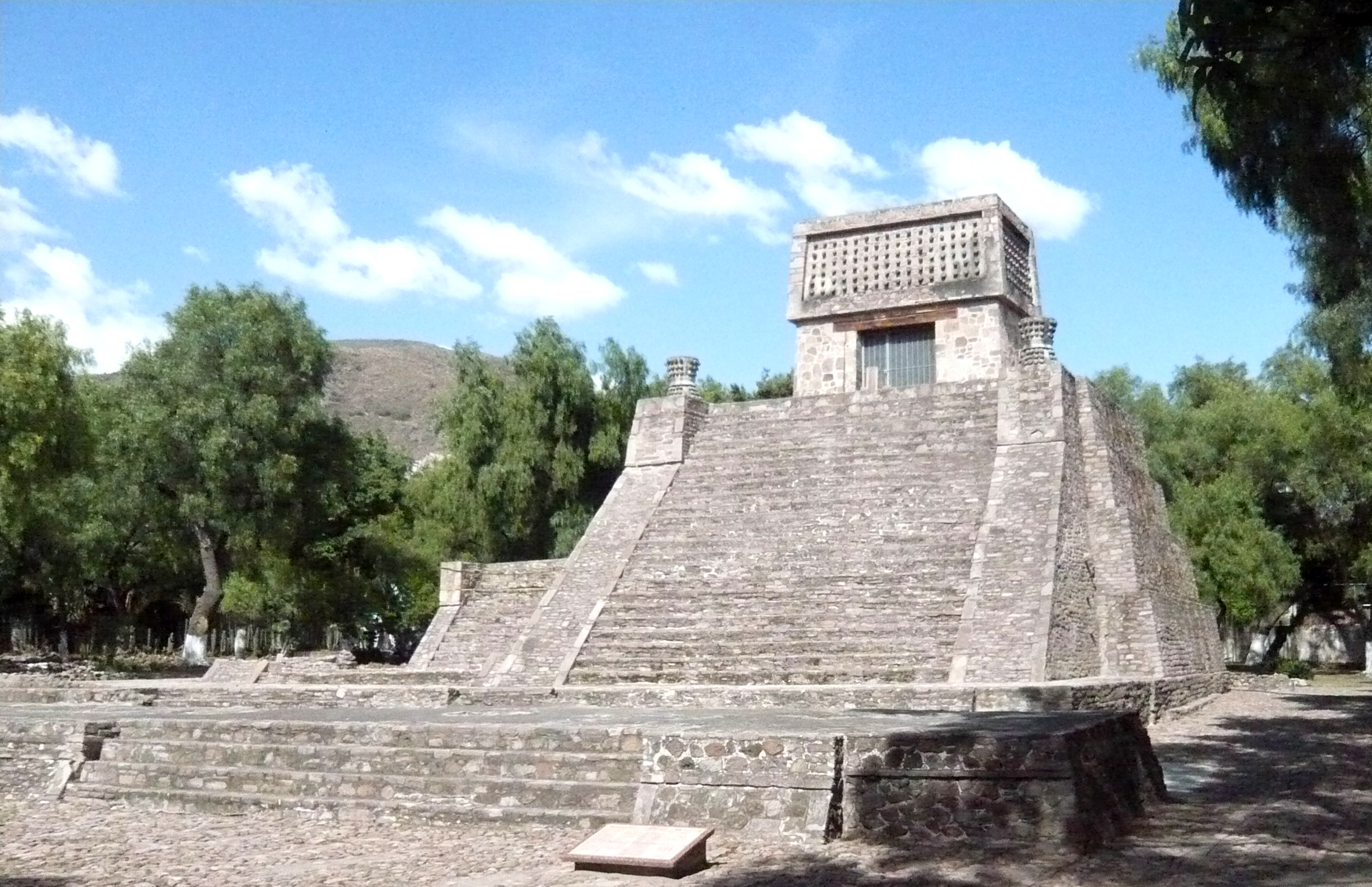
Aztec pyramid of Santa Cecilia Acatitlan

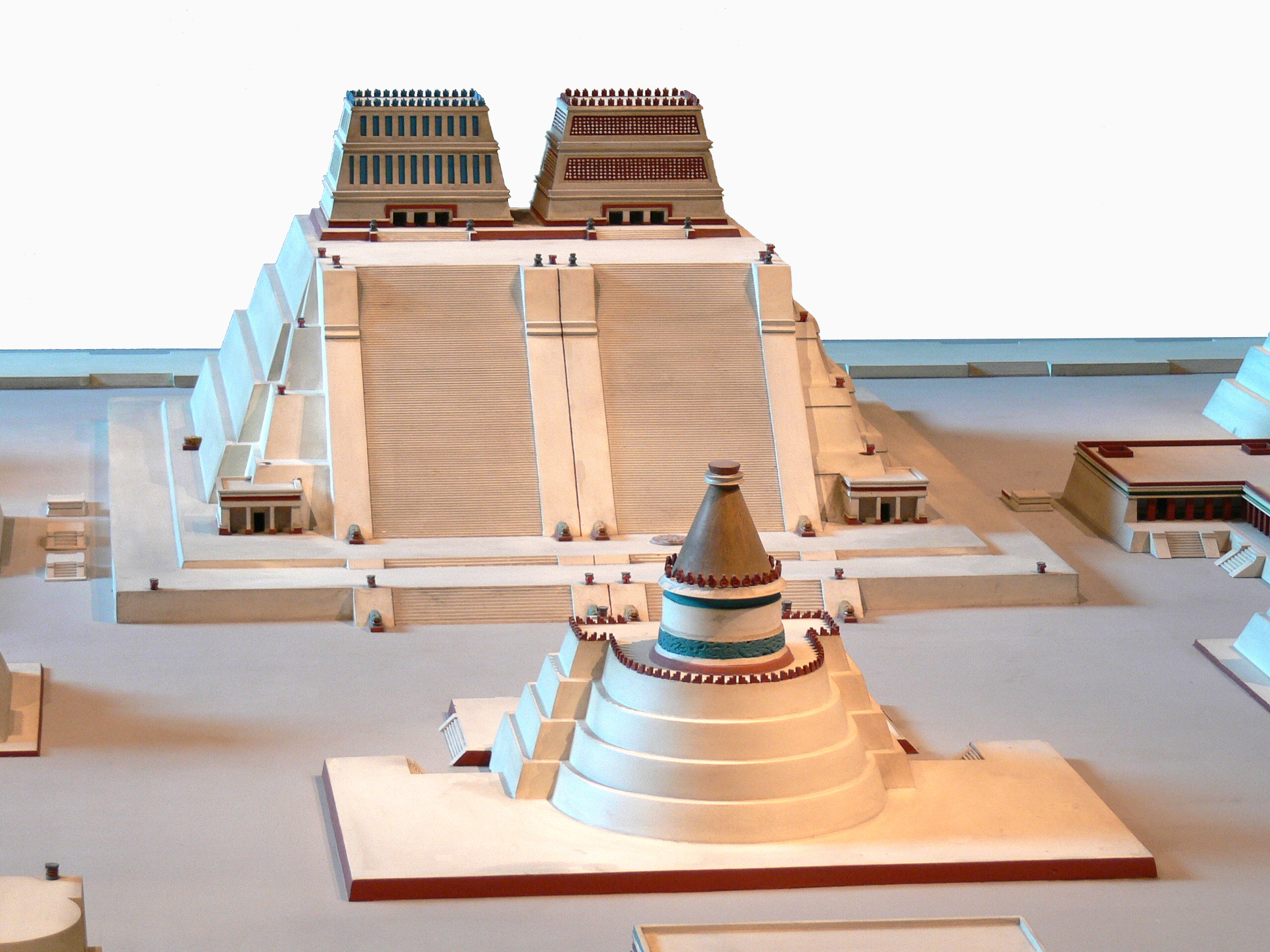
Reconstruction of the temple precinct of Tenochtitlan; the great temple

Aztec architecture is a late form of american architecture developed by the Aztec civilization. Much of what is known about this style of architecture comes from the structures that are still standing. These structures have survived for several centuries because of the strong materials used and the skill of the builders. Most civic architecture was concentrated in the center of Aztec cities. However, many cities had smaller supplemental ceremonial areas.

== Influences ==
Aztec architecture reflects the migration of the Aztec culture across present-day Mexico. The style of early Aztec pyramids was influenced by those of Classic and other Postclassic Mesoamerican societies. Aztec architecture subsequently influenced later Mesoamerican styles. As Manuel Aguilar-Moreno writes, "Aztec architecture was heavily influenced by the Toltec of Colhuacan, the Tepanec of Azcapotzalco, and the Acolhua of Tetzcoco". Since the Aztec Empire was largely built through conquest, the Aztecs had the challenge of incorporating the ethnic groups of the regions they conquered into one unified empire. By having a distinct architectural style, the Aztec Empire was able to promote its worldview and showcase the power of the Empire's military.

It has also been discovered that the dates that occur most frequently in these orientations align with important days in the ritual agricultural cycle of the Aztecs.

== History ==
Some of the most well-known architecture of the Aztec Empire was located in the capital city Tenochtitlan, which was destroyed after the Spanish conquest in the 16th century. Materials taken from the city were then used in the construction of Mexico City. Because of the construction of Mexico City, not much archaeological evidence remains at important Aztec sites such as the Aztec Temple Square.

Aztec architectural sites include Malinalco, Tenayuca, conquered by the Aztecs circa 1434. This site is the earliest known example of the typical Aztec double pyramid—joined pyramidal bases supporting two temples—and the Templo Mayor, the biggest building in the Aztec city Tenochtitlan.

== Style ==
Aztec architecture is characterized by symmetry and elements like geometric designs and sweeping lines. Other key stylistic traits include the use of "bas-reliefs, walls, plazas, and platforms as media to represent their gods and ideals," according to Manuel Aguilar-Moreno.

There are also many symbolic elements inherent in Aztec architecture, including the four cardinal directions, which each represents a deity, color, and symbol. Animal symbols were also utilized in the architectural style of the Aztecs: eagles represent the sun and warriors, serpents represented water or fire, and conch shells symbolized fertility. The temples themselves represented mountains, Aztec symbols for water and fertility. The architecture, particularly the sculptures on and in the temples, were symbolically painted. Each cardinal direction was represented by a color and ruled by a religious figure, details which were incorporated into Aztec architecture on many occasions. The north was believed to be ruled by the god Tezcatlipoca, the god of the night. The north was represented by the color black. The south was said to be ruled by Huitzilopochtli, the god of the sun and warfare, and characterized by the color blue.

== Types of structures ==
The structures in the city of Tenochtitlan included temples, palaces, and platforms. The temples were terraced pyramids with steep stairs leading up to the main temple. Domestic structures reflected the social and financial status of inhabitants.

Elites lived in palaces, which were called tecpans. The word tecpan is often used as a shorthand for many different types of palaces, regardless of any special functions individual structures may have had. "Most commonly, the term [tecpan] meant "The home of a hereditary lord", and it also took on associated meanings, such as the seat of government, place of riches and art, and idyllic retreat amidst scenery and diversions".

Aztec palaces consisted of three main types: Administrative palaces, mansions of wealthy nobles, and pleasure palaces and retreats. Administrative palaces served as the location for local government, as well as the residences of local rulers. The focal point of these structures was a large courtyard near the entrance of the building, surrounded by suites that served various purposes. "The form of the tecpan is dominated by a large courtyard, opening onto the community plaza, which is best seen as a kind of mega-courtyard for the community," according to Susan Evans. The mansions of wealthy nobles were used solely as residences, and were constructed in accordance with Aztec sumptuary laws. Pleasure palaces and retreats served many purposes, ranging from add-on structures at religious shrines to more opulent structures, such as Nezahualcoyotl's baths, located at Texcotzingo.

Substantial evidence has been found for only a few dozen tecpans out of the hundreds that once stood throughout the Aztec Empire. Most of these confirmed findings are administrative tecpans.

Pyramid-temples, or teocalli, were religious buildings whose construction was sponsored by the government to emphasize the religious significance of the area, as well as its imperial might. According to Gary Feinman, Mesoamerican temples were typically rectangular structures with one entrance, located on one of its long sides. The structure of the temple was generally an elevated or shortened pyramid mound. They often consisted of two or more rooms, with an outer and inner chamber, the inner chamber being seen as more sacred.

While rectangular pyramids could be dedicated to a wide range of gods, circular pyramids could only be dedicated to one god, Ehecatl, who represented wind in Aztec culture.

Urban designers in the Aztec period were known for placing small altars in significant locations. Some of these altars were believed to be bases for skull racks used to display victims of sacrifice. Others may have been dedicated to female fertility and curing, areas commonly associated with the tzitzimitl deities in Aztec culture. Still, others may have served as offerings to the god Tezcatlipoca.

Houses were uniform throughout most of the empire, only varying in size and ornamentation.

The Aztecs built causeways and chinampas in Tenochtitlan due to its location in the Mexico City basin. The agricultural innovation of the chinampa was a completely unique structure that used small squares of fertile ground that floated on the water as one of the first historical examples of irrigation techniques as well.

Additionally, ball courts were a very popular construction of architecture used to play the ancient Mesoamerican ball game. Usually the ball court was constructed in a classic "I" shape that was the standard of the game. These courts were called tlachtli or tlachco, and the game itself went by the name of ullamaliztli. Not only were these courts and the game used for the thrill of sport but also held significant religious value as well. Typically, when Aztecs resided in a new settlement construction of a shrine to Huizilopochtli and a ball court directly next to it was among the first things built.

Due to the fact that the largest major cities such as Tenochtitlan were built upon small islands with marsh-like terrain, these settlements only had so much clean drinking water. This led to the construction of Aztec aqueducts used to bring drinking water from freshwater sources and springs to the Aztec settlements.

== Building techniques ==
The Aztecs had advanced knowledge of building techniques, and they knew how to adapt their techniques to the local geology and terrain of an area, particularly the soft soil. The builders traditionally constructed stone bases for the temples. J. A. Joyce writes that "[t]he physical geography of Central America was favorable to the rise of the art of building in stone." Some structures, such as the Templo Mayor of Tenochtitlan were constructed on top of many hundreds of support piles to help stabilize the building in the marshy terrain surrounding Tenochtitlan.

The Aztecs were also known to use gravity to create a running water system, bringing fresh water to the city grid. They also employed terracing to enhance agricultural productivity.

Instead of demolishing old temples and building a new one at the same site, the Aztecs sometimes built over the existing structures, which resulted in larger and more detailed pyramids. Some temples have been found to have at least four or five layers.

== Relationship with Aztec culture ==
The Aztecs designed their buildings to be functional for everyday life as well as having a major importance on buildings for religious practices, and for the gods that they worshiped. The architectural style of the Aztecs reflected relationships with a higher power. In Tenochtitlan, the layout of the city represented the birth of Huitzilopochtli, the Aztec god of the sun and war.

The teocalli, or pyramid-temples, were significant to Aztec religious practices. They were the sites of religious celebrations and rituals. The temples represented ascension. There were multiple torn levels, which each correlated with different classes. The Aztecs believed that ascension was the process of preparing oneself to please the gods. At the top was the main temple where sacrifices took place, since that was considered to be closest to the gods.

In Cholula, Puebla a Central Aztec temple was discovered in 1978. This temple was used to worship their sun and war deity Huitzilopochtli, and the deity of fertility, water, and rain,Tlaloc. The temple contain alters where they would leave offerings, which were mainly animals and hand made sculptures. The temple also contained an alter where they would make sacrifices to the gods. They used red and blue paint to decorate the temple.

Aztec households were simple and uniform to the rest of the civilization. Houses could be one to two stories tall.

There is a large circular building resembling a lecture hall that was believed to be a place were the Aztecs would hold governmental affairs.

=== Separation of classes ===
Aztec culture had class stratification. The highest social rank was that of the priesthood, which permitted access to the temples and more exclusive quarters. Members of the priesthood lived near the temples in the central areas of the city, while people of lower classes lived increasingly further away according to their status. The sizes of domestic structures reflected differences in wealth, power, and status. Those who were considered in the lower social ranks had homes made up of adobe brick, and varied in size. Those who considered to be higher class had homes made of cut stone, they had more rooms and were larger homes compared to those of a lower class, they also found things of status like jewelry in these homes

== Aztec architecture today ==
=== Disappearance ===
In modern times there are few ruins of the Aztec Empire remaining. There are many theories as to why there are so few ruins left of the Aztec empire. One of these is that there is just not enough information on how the Aztec empire ran. It could have been more agriculturally based and less building based, with the Aztecs focusing on farming rather than building durable structures. Another theory is that there is evidence that it was a looser system of tributaries rather than a tightly connected empire. The Aztecs may have been more worried about what they could acquire from these tributaries, rather than assimilating others to their beliefs.

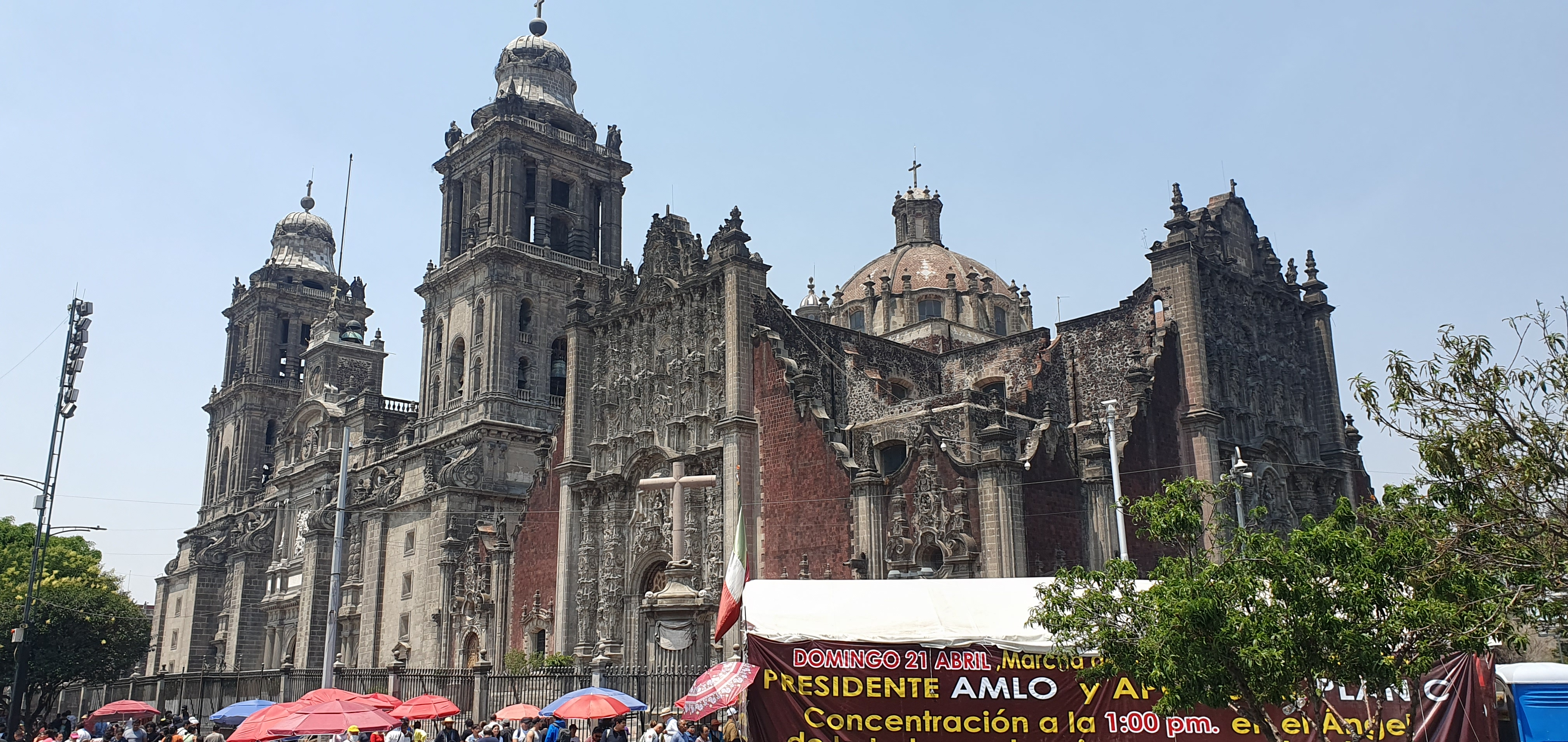
The Mexico City Metropolitan Cathedral

Much of the Aztec infrastructure was also destroyed by the Spanish. The Spanish Conquistadors razed Tenochtitlan in the process of conquering the city in 1521, later establishing Mexico City over top of its remains. One example is the Spanish building of the first Cathedral in Latin America called the Metropolitan Cathedral, which is situated above an Aztec temple named Templo Mayor.
