= Capra Press =

US independent publishing house

Capra Press is an independent publishing house that was founded in Santa Barbara, California, in 1969. The press relocated to San Francisco, California, in 2011.

== History ==
Noel Young (1922–2002), a former commercial printer, founded the press in 1969 with a volume of poetry, Journey, by Gordon Grant. Previous to the founding of Capra Press, Young had been producing volumes under the imprint of Noel Young Editions and Capricorn Press. Many of the Capra-published books from the 1970s through the 1980s were designed by Frank Allen Goad (1938–2019). Before his death in 2002, at the age of 79, Young published over three hundred titles with the Capra imprint, including books by such writers as Anaïs Nin, Henry Miller, Raymond Carver, Lawrence Durrell, and Ursula K. Le Guin.

In the last years of operation, as Young's health failed, David Dahl took over editorial duties at Capra. The press was sold to antiquarian book dealer Robert Bason in 2001. In March 2011, Capra was purchased by Hilary Young Brodey (Noel Young's oldest daughter), her husband Phil Brodey, and their friends John and Diana Harrington.
