= Storer House (Los Angeles) =

Historic house in Los Angeles, California

- U.S. National Register of Historic Places
- Los Angeles Historic-Cultural Monument
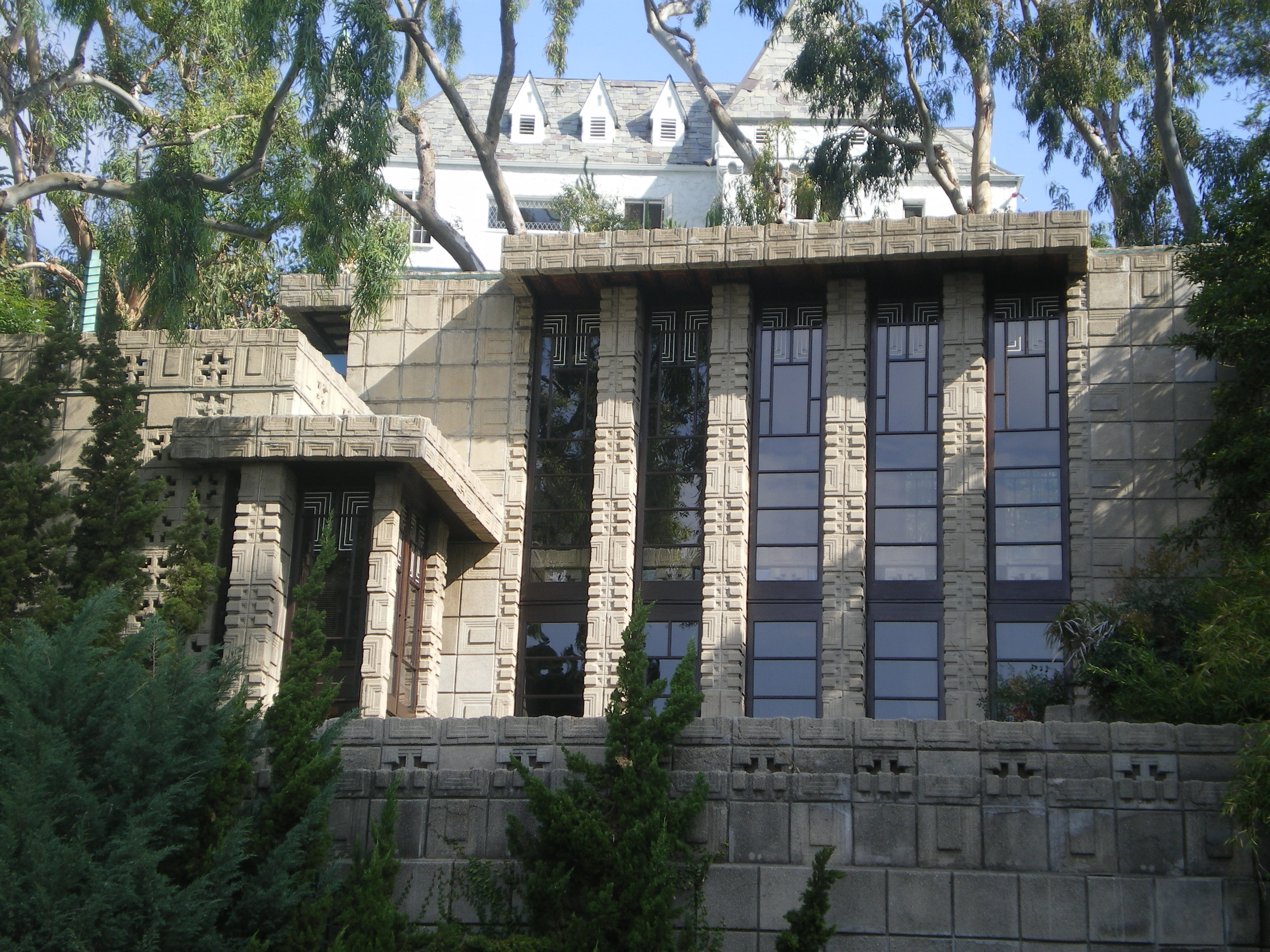
- Storer House in 2008

- Location within the Los Angeles metropolitan area Location within California Location within the United States
- Location: 8161 Hollywood Boulevard; Los Angeles, California, U.S.
- Coordinates: 34°06′03.1″N 118°22′01.7″W
- Built: 1923
- Architect: Frank Lloyd Wright
- Architectural style: Mayan Revival, Textile Block
- NRHP reference No.: 71000152
- LAHCM No.: 96

Significant dates
- Added to NRHP: September 28, 1971
- Designated LAHCM: February 23, 1972

The Storer House is a residence at 8161 Hollywood Boulevard in the Hollywood Hills neighborhood of Los Angeles in California, United States. Designed by the architect Frank Lloyd Wright in the Mayan Revival style for the homeopathic physician John Storer, it was completed in 1924. The house is one of four concrete textile block houses that Wright designed in Greater Los Angeles in the 1920s, along with La Miniatura, the Ennis House, and the Freeman House. The Storer House is a Los Angeles Historic-Cultural Monument and is listed on the National Register of Historic Places.

The Storer House is a two-story structure with a T-shaped floor plan and sits on the slope of a hill. The exterior is built of concrete textile blocks, which are alternately plain in design or decorated with engraved patterns. The house is accessed by a series of terraces, which lead to five glass doors on the southern facade, separated by concrete piers. Inside, the house has approximately 3,000 square feet (280 m^{2}) with three bedrooms, a den, and three bathrooms. The dining room and kitchen are on the lower level, while the living room is on the upper level. The other rooms occupy a separate, adjacent mass; two bedrooms and the bathroom occupy a mezzanine between the upper and lower levels, and the third bedroom and the den are in a basement under the mezzanine.

For the Storer House, Wright reused a set of plans that he had drawn for a family who ultimately hired another architect. A. C. Parlee was hired as the general contractor in late 1923 but was quickly replaced by Wright's son Lloyd. The house was formally completed in October 1924, and Storer sold it three years later. Over the next six decades, the Storer House passed through multiple owners and fell into a state of disrepair. The filmmaker Joel Silver bought the house in 1984 and spent up to $2 million renovating it, winning two awards for his restoration. Silver ultimately sold the house in 2002, and it was resold in 2015.

== Site ==
The Storer House is located at 8161 Hollywood Boulevard in the Hollywood Hills neighborhood of Los Angeles in California, United States. Designed by Frank Lloyd Wright, the house sits on the side of a hill. Wright's nearly-contemporary Samuel Freeman House was also built on a hilltop site; the writer Robert C. Twombly wrote that this made the houses look "seemingly impenetrable" from the street. The site was originally part of a hilly parcel known as Cielo Vista Terrace, which was split into multiple lots in 1922; Aurele Vermeulen laid out the streets there around the same time. The house's original owner John Storer acquired an irregular pentagonal parcel just after Cielo Vista Terrace had been subdivided. Located nearby are the Stahl House to the west and Chateau Marmont to the southwest.

== Architecture ==
The Storer House is one of eight buildings that Frank Lloyd Wright designed in Greater Los Angeles, alongside houses like the Millard House (also known as La Miniatura), the Hollyhock House, the Ennis House, and the Freeman House. (Note: Besides these houses, Wright's three other works in Greater Los Angeles are the Anderton Court Building in Beverly Hills, the Sturges House in Brentwood, and the Arch Oboler House's gatehouse on Mulholland Drive.) The Ennis, Freeman, Millard, and Storer houses were the only four textile block houses he designed in Los Angeles. According to the writer Hugh Hart, "Wright saw his Textile Block Method approach as an utterly modern, and democratic, expression of his organic architecture ideal." Few of his clients ended up commissioning textile-block designs, given the novelty of the construction method. As The New York Times later said: "Aside from the free-spirited oil heiress Aline Barnsdall, whom he fought with constantly, his motley clients included a jewelry salesman [Samuel Freeman], a rare-book dealing widow [Alice Millard] and a failed doctor [John Storer]." After designing the four textile-block houses, Wright went on to design various concrete-block buildings across the U.S., including Usonian houses made of "Usonian Automatic" blocks.

The Storer House is an example of Wright's pre-Columbian or early Modernist architecture. Wright was also intrigued by archaeological discoveries on Mexico's Yucatan Peninsula and used elements from Maya architecture and design in the Storer House. The four Southern California textile-block houses represented Wright's earliest uses of the exotic, monumental Maya forms. The architectural writer Paul Goldberger wrote that although the Storer House shared Mayan elements with the Hollyhock House, it also had vertical piers and large cornices in a similar manner to Wright's earlier Prairie-style homes. The layout was adapted from Wright's 1922 design for the Lowes family, who ultimately hired another architect to design them a house in Eagle Rock, Los Angeles. Wright's original design for the Lowes family was supposed to have been made of stucco and wood, but this was changed to concrete when the plans were recycled for the Storer House's original owner, John Storer.

=== Exterior ===
Due to the house's layout, it has five levels, despite being only three stories tall (the upper level of the house is a double-height space). The plans are similar to those of the unbuilt Lowes House design, which called for a main house with a dining room and living room, two bedrooms in a separate wing, and a garage and kitchen extending off the house. As built, the main house is flanked by a one-story wing to the west and a two-car garage to the right.

==== Facade ====
The typical block has square faces measuring 16 by 16 inches (410 mm × 410 mm) across. Although each block is 4 inches (100 mm) deep, the interiors of the blocks are hollow, meaning that the layer of concrete in each block is at most 2 inches (51 mm) thick. Some of the blocks at the house's corners have two perpendicular faces measuring 8 inches (200 mm) across, with a small hollow cavity, and other blocks measure 3.5 inches (89 mm) across, with no cavity. Some of the blocks have three faces and are used on copings at the top of parapet walls. Unlike the later Ennis and Freeman houses, in which mortar joints are placed between the blocks, no mortar was used in the Storer House. Instead, the blocks had to be cut to precise dimensions and were separated by "reveals" that resembled joints. The blocks are fastened to each other using loops of steel and also contain steel rods. The "textile block" name is derived from how the rods are integrated with the blocks, giving them a knitted-together appearance. Wright's assistant Edgar Tafel also claimed that the blocks could be mass-produced, similar to factory-made items.

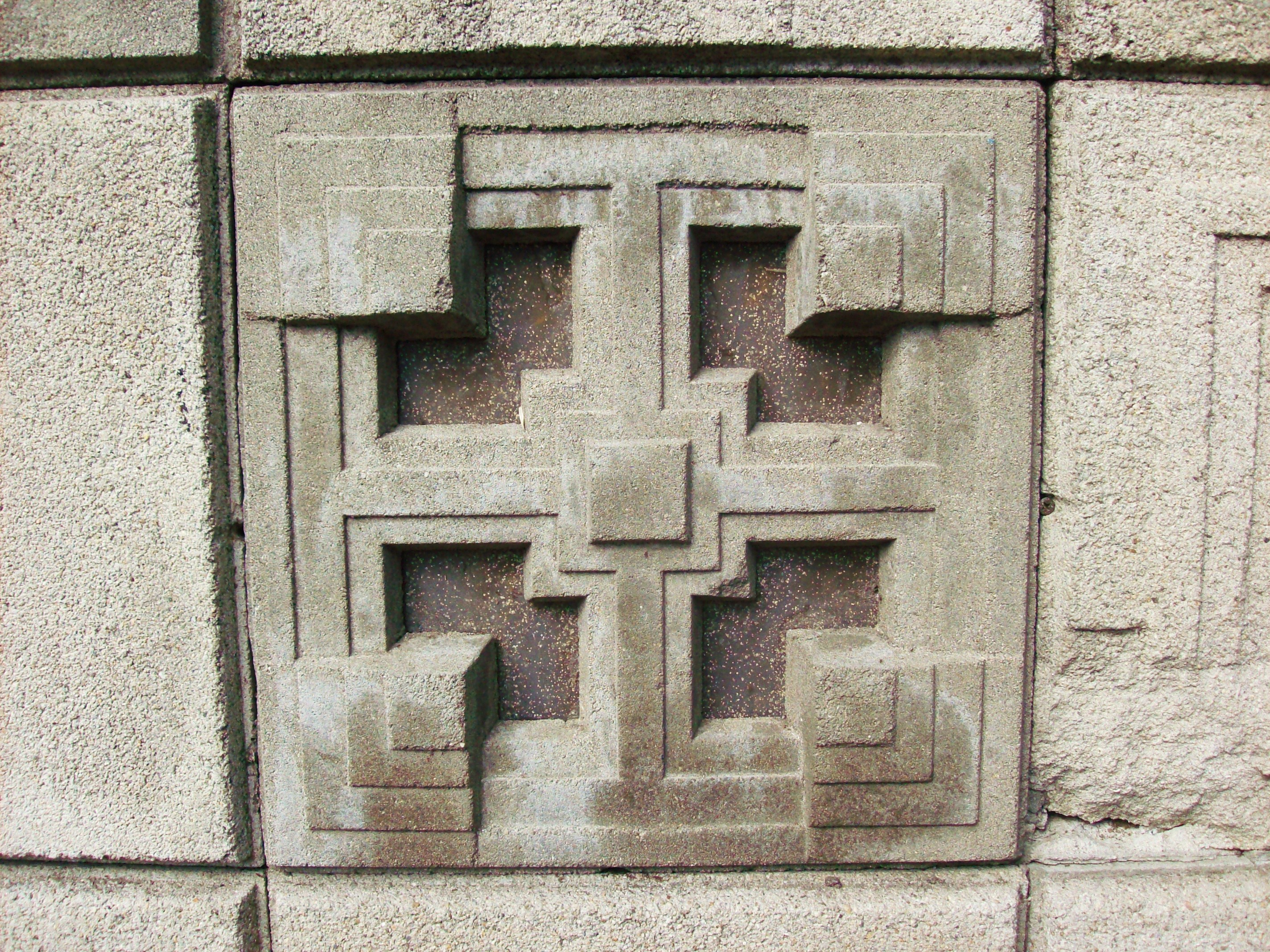
Detail of a textile block

Wright used sledgehammers and aluminum molds to imprint elaborate Maya-inspired patterns into the blocks. The textile-block motifs were intended to blend the home's design into the hillside, in conformance with Wright's affinity for organic architecture. The house uses eleven block shapes, which are carved in four patterns. On blocks with multiple faces, all of these faces are decorated with recessed, concentric half-squares. The other patterns are used on the standard 16-by-16-inch squares and depict a convex motif, a patterned cruciform, or a group of three protruding rectangles. These designs were adapted from Wright's earlier Unity Temple and A. D. German Warehouse. Both the interior and exterior faces of the walls have engraved patterns. The textile blocks absorbed moisture easily and were prone to decay because of impurities that existed when the blocks were cast.

==== Terraces and entrances ====
Wright included three exterior terraces in the Storer House's design, via which the house was to be accessed. Past the entrance gate (located south of the house), a flight of seven steps ascends to a terrace. Another flight of seven stairs extends off the right (north) side of the terrace, ascending to an upper terrace with a pool and fountain. The pool, added in a 1980s renovation, is surrounded by limestone blocks that resemble the design of the house's concrete blocks. Prior to the pool's construction, a sunken garden had been located there. The upper terrace is one story above the street.

The southern elevation of the facade has no conventional main door, but there is a series of vertical concrete piers, which divide the facade into five bays containing identical glass doors. Each bay contains a single glass pane. According to the writer Robert Sweeney, the second-leftmost door was supposed to be made of wood and serve as the main entrance. Since this detail was omitted from the final design, the westernmost door, directly in front of the exterior stairway, is used as the main entrance by default. One observer wrote that the house was laid out "as if to finalize the metaphor of privacy and retrenchment", while another writer said the lack of a front door was an example of Wright's predilection for entrances that were "secluded, mysterious, evoking our primitive ancestors finding shelter in a cave".

The north elevation of the house also has five bays, interspersed between concrete piers that are identical to those on the south elevation. Outside the northern elevation is a patio supported by a retaining wall, which in turn faces a hillside to the north.

=== Interior ===
The house spans approximately 3,000 square feet (280 m^{2}) with three bedrooms, a den, and three bathrooms, (Note: One Los Angeles Times source gives a more precise measurement of 2,967 square feet (275.6 m^{2}) and says that the house has four bedrooms rather than three.) and is arranged on a T-shaped floor plan. The house occupies three separate, interconnected masses. The living and dining rooms occupy the T-shaped plan's stem, the kitchen extends off the dining room, and the bedrooms occupy the crossbar. The dining room and kitchen are on the lower level, while the living room is located on the upper level directly above the dining room. Two bedrooms and the bathroom occupy a mezzanine between the upper and lower levels, and the third bedroom and the den are in a basement directly below the mezzanine. The patterned blocks of the exterior are also used inside the house; for example, the patterned cruciform motif is used in partition screens, while the three-rectangle motif is used in the chimney.

==== Lower level and mezzanines ====
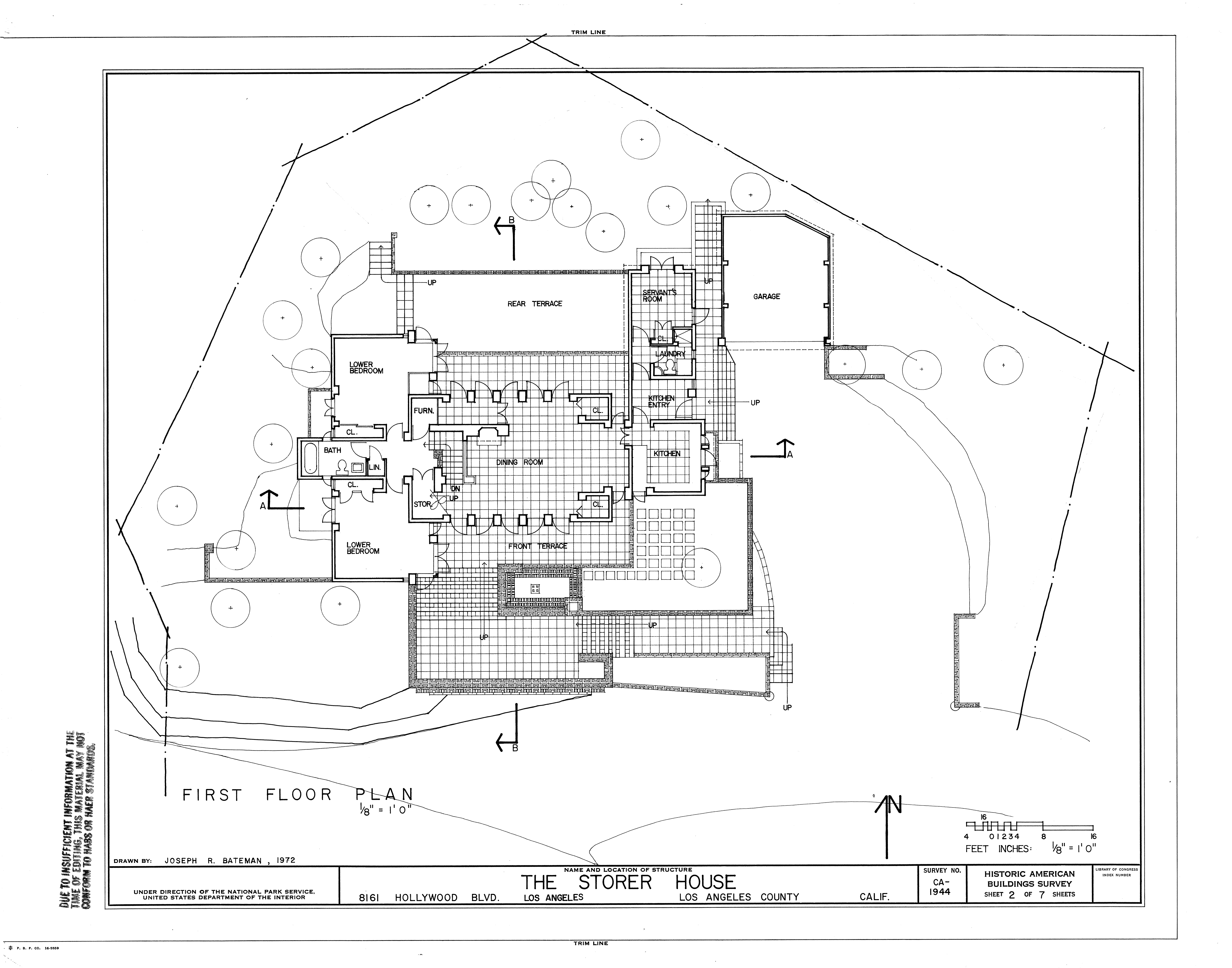
Floor plan

The rectangular dining room occupies the center of the lower level and is oriented with its longer axis running east–west. The main entrance (in the second-westernmost bay of the south elevation) leads to the southwest corner of the dining room, where there is an entrance hall shaped like two juxtaposed squares. Similarly to Wright's other houses, the entrance hall has a low ceiling and leads to spaces with higher ceilings. The fireplace is asymmetrically placed near the dining room's north wall, directly facing the main entrance, and faces south. The dining room extends east from the fireplace and has a ceiling with exposed wooden beams, which connect the piers on the north and south elevations of the house. A square kitchen extends off the east side of the dining room; it includes green marble countertops with metal appliances.

On the west side of the dining room, a half-flight of stairs ascends to the bathroom, which is flanked by one bedroom on either side. The master bedroom abuts a wall of perforated concrete blocks, with a movable glass panel behind it. The bedrooms have ceiling beams which rest on concrete-block walls on opposite sides of each room. The stair continues up to the living room, wrapping around the fireplace and running behind a wall with perforated concrete blocks. Another stair next to the dining room descends to the basement.

==== Upper level ====
On the upper level is a 21-by-26-foot (6.4 by 7.9 m) living room, which runs along the front elevation, facing the street. The ceiling of the living area measures 13 feet (4.0 m) high. There are columns, a double-height ceiling with redwood beams, and tall narrow windows on either wall. The ceiling beams run between the piers on the house's north and south elevations.

Outside the living room are two terraces. A small terrace extends above the roof of the kitchen to the east, and another terrace faces the hillside to the north. The original plans for the house called for a flat roof with eaves protruding from the facade on all sides; these would have functioned as lintels at the top of each pier. As built, a monitor roof, which is slightly raised above the main roof but lacks clerestory windows, runs between the western and eastern walls of the living room, protruding above the doorways on either wall. The monitor roof is supported by a pair of parallel wooden beams that protrude from the facade.

== History ==
The Storer House was one of multiple high-profile projects that Wright completed in the 1920s, along with his other Los Angeles houses and Tokyo's Imperial Hotel. Wright had received the commissions for the Freeman, Ennis, and Storer houses nearly simultaneously, shortly after he had completed La Miniatura. The order in which the three houses was constructed is disputed, although the Storer House is agreed to have been built before the other two. (Note: The order is unclear because the Freeman House was completed before the entire Ennis House was ready, but after part of the Ennis House had been opened. The Freeman House was completed in March 1925. The Ennis House's garage was finished in December 1924, but the main part of the Ennis House was not done until August 1925.) Wright's grandson Eric Lloyd Wright and Los Angeles Times reporter Charles Lockwood stated that the Freeman House was built last, while other sources described the Ennis House as having been built last. Prior to constructing the textile-block houses, Wright had used pre-Columbian motifs in other structures such as Chicago's Midway Gardens and Richland Center, Wisconsin's German Warehouse.

=== Development ===
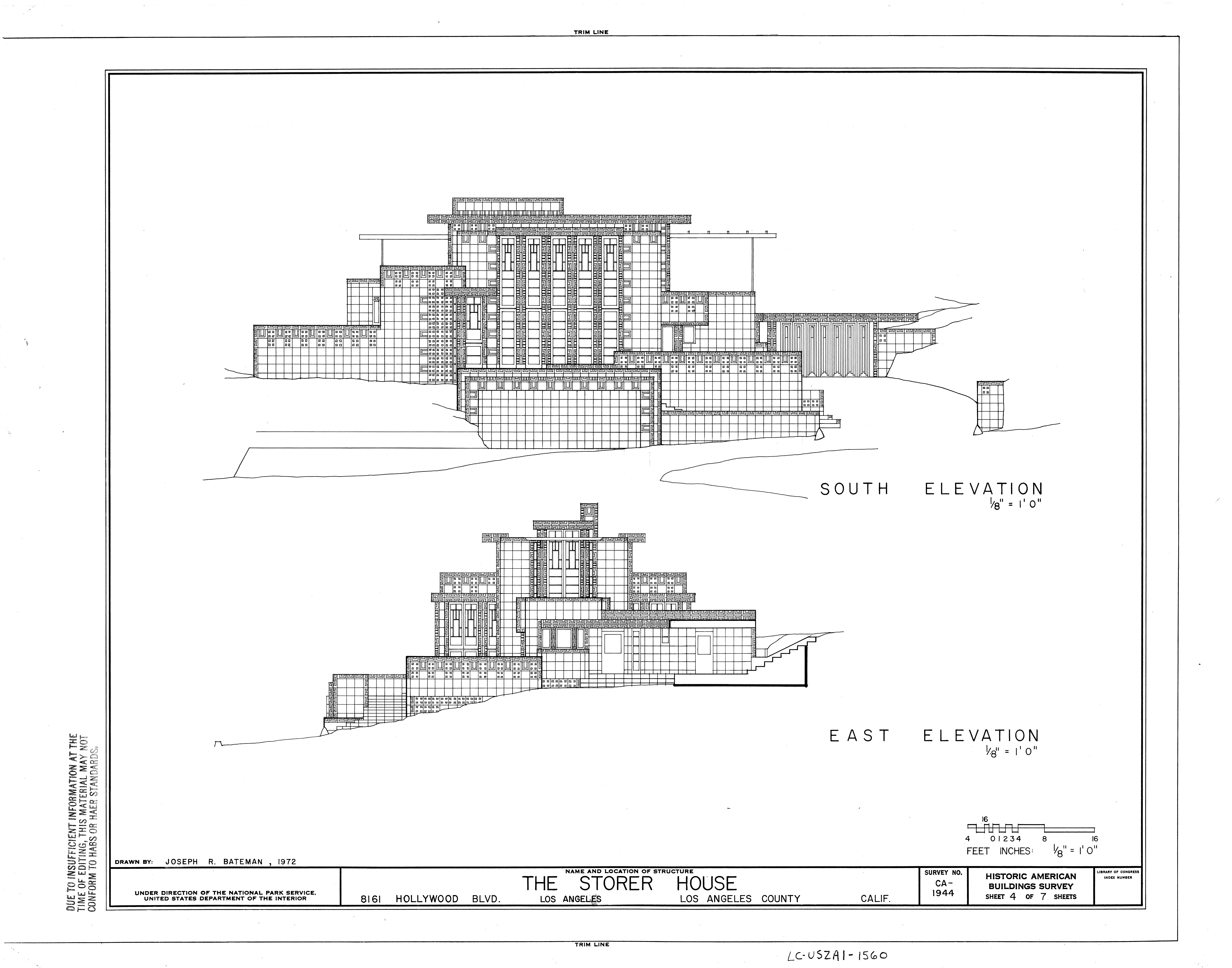
Drawings of south and east elevations

The client, John Storer, was a homeopathic physician. Unlike the clients of Wright's other textile-block houses, Storer was not part of either the avant-garde or a progressive movement. Storer moved from Chicago to the Los Angeles area in 1917 and became a real estate developer two years later, when he failed a medical licensing exam. The Superior Building Company was established in 1921 at number 1920 Grammercy Place, where Storer lived at the time. Though it has not been confirmed whether Storer led this company, the name was mentioned on Wright's architectural drawings. Design of the Storer House was underway by August 1923, at which point Wright was already adjusting the technical details of the textile-block system. For the Storer House, Wright reused the plans that he had drawn for the Lowes family. The Lowes plans were rotated 180 degrees, and Wright rotated the garage to accommodate the parcel's irregular shape. A kitchen wing was also added, while the bedroom wing was split into two levels. Eric later said that Wright was "trying to create something beautiful, with its own character and quality", even though his grandfather's textile-block houses generally featured little ornamentation.

Originally, the Storer House was supposed to have cost $15,000. A. C. Parlee, a contractor from Pasadena who had previously built the Millard House, had been hired by November 1923 to construct the Storer House. Parlee was fired within five weeks, after Storer had sued Parlee to obtain the formula for the concrete textile blocks. Wright's son Lloyd Wright replaced Parlee as the contractor. The Storer House's concrete blocks differed from those used in the Millard House, in that the Storer blocks had interior coffers and were laid in multiple layers. Work proceeded steadily at first; by February 1924, images showed that the house's exterior walls had been built up to the second floor. To create the blocks, workers mixed granite, sand, and gravel, and the resulting aggregate was then blended with Portland cement at a 4:1 ratio. The mixture was then blended with water and stirred until the mixture could stand up on its own. This material was then cast into aluminum molds, and the blocks were removed from the molds and kept moist for weeks.

As with Wright's other textile-block buildings, the construction cost significantly exceeded its original budget because of the unusual construction methods that were used. As the house neared completion, construction slowed down due to a lack of money. In September 1924, Frank wrote to Lloyd that the Storer House still needed about $3,000, and the next month, Frank told his son to have Storer bill him for another $2,000. Wright also wanted to add colorful awnings with brass-and-copper supports, believing that they would enhance the house's design. Lloyd ended up designing simpler awnings supported by simple pipes. Wright filed a notice of completion on October 27, 1924, at which point the final construction cost had been calculated at $27,000. Some design features such as garage doors were omitted from the final plans to save money, while other features were excluded due to disagreements between architect and client. Frank later wrote to his son that he believed the Storer House was "a tragedy from my standpoint", while recognizing that Lloyd had given the house his best efforts.

=== Mid-20th-century ownership ===
Storer's opinion of the house has not been documented, in contrast to some of Wright's other clients, who were vocal about what they thought of their houses. In any case, by 1925, the building was already being auctioned off, and Storer ultimately sold it in 1927, having owned the house for less than four years. The house was then sold multiple times afterward. Pauline Schindler, the estranged wife of Wright's protege Rudolph Schindler, had moved into the Storer House by 1931, renting it for several years. Pauline wrote to Wright's wife Olgivanna, saying that "the room in which I sit writing is a form so superb that I am constantly conscious of an immense obligation to Mr. Wright". During Schindler's occupancy, the photographer Brett Weston operated a photography studio in the house.

The house had already changed ownership four times by 1935, when it was owned by the Druffel family. That year, the family was sued by three neighboring property owners, who claimed that eucalyptus trees on the Storer property were blocking natural light to the plaintiffs' houses. Helen Druffel wrote to Wright requesting that he design them a roof garden. Wright drew up plans for a terrace surrounded by a 6-foot-tall (1.8 m) parapet, in addition to an awning, a new staircase, and an expanded chimney, but this was never completed. In the decades after Storer sold the house, the building fell into disrepair; the concrete decorations, roofs, doors, and window surrounds were particularly badly affected. The lack of joints allowed water to leak through the walls, and the roof also lacked properly-installed flashing, allowing water to seep through that way as well. The facade was also painted over at one point; a later owner tried to remove the paint using a sandblaster, creating dents in the concrete blocks. There were rotting and sagging decorations all over the house, and some architectural details had gone missing entirely.

=== Joel Silver ownership ===
The house was placed for sale in 1981 with an asking price of $1 million. The filmmaker Joel Silver, who had produced films such as Lethal Weapon and Die Hard, wanted to acquire the house, having seen it years before while working as a gofer. Silver had been interested in acquiring the Storer House since 1975, but he did not have enough money until 1982, when the film 48 Hrs. became a box-office hit. After the building went on sale, Silver negotiated with its owner for several years. He eventually agreed to buy it in January 1984, though sources disagree on whether Silver took ownership of the house in July or September 1984. Silver is variously reported to have paid $726,000, $750,000, or $790,000 for the house. Silver was one of several celebrities in Los Angeles who, at the time, were buying houses by 20th-century modernist architects. Furthermore, relatively little attention was being paid to Wright's Los Angeles textile-block houses, which had fallen into disrepair.

==== Restoration ====
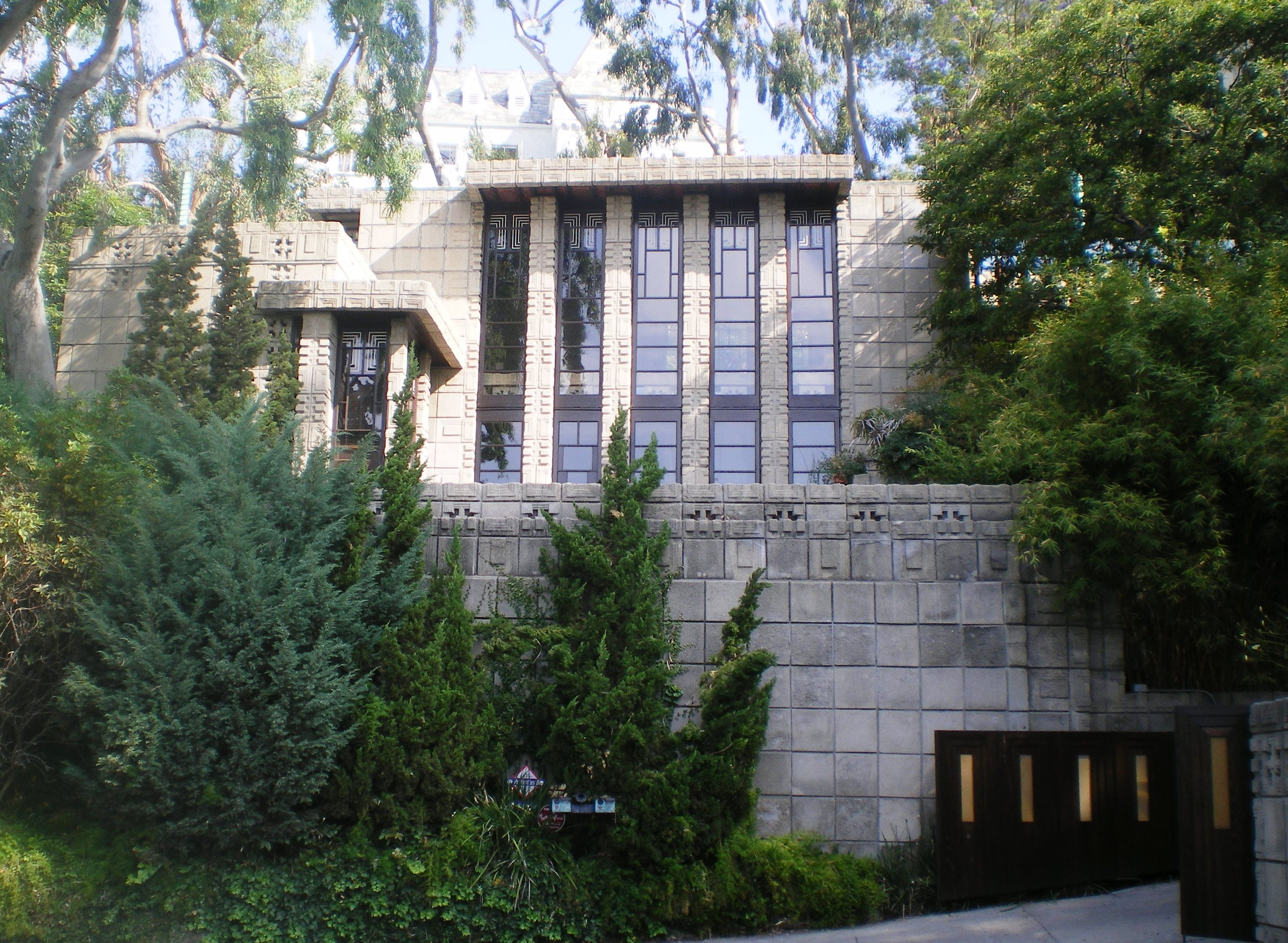
View from street, 2008

After buying the house, Silver began restoring the structure under the supervision of Frank's grandson Eric Lloyd Wright, former Los Angeles Conservancy president Martin Eli Weil, and interior designer Linda Marder. Also involved were Peter Purens (alternatively spelled Buren), a restoration technologist, and Thomas Heinz, an Illinois-based consultant who was an expert on Wright's buildings. Eric's son Devon also helped with the restoration, and the glass artist Arthur Stern was hired to create 92 stained-glass windows for the project. Silver also bought decorations and furniture by Wright and other early-20th-century architects, and the art dealer Tod Volpe helped Silver with the purchases. Among the objects Silver acquired were a dining table from the house of Wright's secretary, as well as a chair from the Trier House, which Wright had designed in Iowa.

Before renovating the house, Silver researched Wright's work extensively, consulting a collection of architectural books owned by the actor Zero Mostel (the father of one of Silver's friends). The mechanical systems and the original design details were replaced, and workers removed lacquer and varnish from the woodwork, which instead had to be coated in oil regularly. Part of the facade was reconstructed, and workers built replicas of the original concrete blocks to replace those that had cracked. One of the challenges in the restoration effort entailed developing a formula to duplicate the structure's concrete blocks. After several combinations of materials had failed, workers resorted to using earth from the backyard, mixed with cement. Silver had to obtain custom-designed molds so workers could pour the replacement blocks in the same patterns as the original blocks. Newer electric wires were concealed within existing architectural details. Silver also restored the original landscaping and added a security system, and he discovered Wright's original plans for the house's colorful awnings. Silver later said that his efforts were intended to conform closely to the original design and "make Wright happy".

During the renovation, there were disagreements over the extent to which the original design should be reproduced. For the bathroom, Silver agreed to remove fixtures from the 1950s and add fixtures that would have been commonplace in the 1920s. By contrast, he insisted on modern appliances for the kitchen, over objections from the architects. Eric Wright worked with Silver in completing elements that had been included in Wright's original plans but never constructed. These included installing a pool, constructing the garage doors to the original plans, enlarging the garage, and constructing a concrete wall next to the driveway. The restoration had been completed by 1985. Though the Los Angeles Times put the renovation cost at $250,000, other sources cited Silver as having spent up to $2 million.

==== Post-restoration ====
After the Storer House was restored, Silver invited 50 couples to visit the house in January 1985 to celebrate the completion of the project, and he also invited members of the Los Angeles Conservancy to tour it. Silver's restoration project won a Preservation Award from the Los Angeles Conservancy in 1985. The project also received an architectural-excellence award from the California Council of the American Institute of Architects in 1986, one of the first times a restoration project in California had received that prize. Silver later reflected that the restoration was "a phenomenal episode in my life" and that he considered it to be more important than anything else he had ever carried out. The restoration of the Storer House led Silver to buy the Wright–designed Auldbrass Plantation in South Carolina, which he also renovated, using furnishings designed by Wright.

By the early 1990s, Silver primarily lived in the Storer House but also visited the Auldbrass Plantation twice monthly. The Storer House remained a private residence through the 1990s. Though Silver had initially planned to host tours of the house after renovating it, a Los Angeles Times reporter wrote in 1991 that the general public were rarely invited in. Herbert Muschamp of The New York Times later wrote that Silver had "become a figure in architecture circles" because of his passion for Wright's work, saying the Storer House's design drew parallels to Silver's 1999 film The Matrix.

=== Subsequent sales ===
By 1998, Silver had placed the Storer House on sale for $5.5 million, including its furnishings, as he wanted to build a new Los Angeles residence. It was one of the most expensive Wright–designed properties listed for sale at the time. Despite having put "a small fortune" into the restoration, Silver had difficulty finding a buyer. Reports indicated that a similar home would sell for $1 million, leading Forbes magazine to ask: "Will someone pay a 400% premium to live in a piece of architectural history? Probably not. Even immaculately restored, the Storer House still has drawbacks: It's small, the address is just a shade east of swanky Beverly Hills and the other houses on the hills above invade its privacy." The asking price had been decreased to $4.5 million by 2000, and it was reduced again the next year to $3.5 million.

Silver ultimately sold the house in 2002 to a couple associated with Microsoft. The sale price at the time was variously reported as $2.9 million or $3.5 million. In 2013, the house was listed for sale once more. It sold two years later in February 2015 for a reported $6.8 million or $6.9 million. At the time, it was believed to be the most expensive Wright–designed house ever sold; this record was broken in 2019 when Ronald Burkle sold the nearby Ennis House for $18 million.

== Impact ==
A writer for the Sacramento Bee described the house as "imposing a strong order on its steeply sloped location", and Daniel Cohen of The Washington Post described the design as blending "Wright's search for a technological breakthrough using concrete with his genius for making a house a manmade extension of its landscape". Conversely, Wright biographer Brendan Gill described the Storer House as not having achieved the desired effect of blending in with the hillside, saying the building "asserts its presence with a surprising degree of arrogance—an arrogance far more obvious in the 1920s, when the hillside lacked the softening effect of foliage, than it is today." The writer Robert Sweeney described the house's interior spaces as having an effect that was "part temple and part grotto", while an Associated Press reporter called it "a Pompeiian villa remarkable for having no front door". Another writer for the Observer called it "Californian Mayan strong, original, four square and fortress-like". The biographer Meryle Secrest wrote that all of Wright's textile-block houses were "monumental, aloof and irresistibly Mayan in feeling".

Silver's preservation of the house was praised. Wright historian Tom Heinz and GQ magazine reporter Rochelle Reed both said that Silver's restoration of the Storer House was likely unrivaled by any other project, aside from a restoration of a living room in New York's Metropolitan Museum of Art. Both Reed and Paul Goldberger, then the architectural critic at The New York Times, wrote that the house was among the United States' best restorations of a Wright–designed house. Goldberger, in his critique, described Storer House as the most appealing of Wright's textile-block houses, while Reed thought the building stood out even from the mansions that surrounded it. Another writer for The New York Times said in 2005 that the Storer House "is widely considered the best-preserved Wright building in Los Angeles".

The Storer House was added to the National Register of Historic Places on September 28, 1971, and designated as a Los Angeles Historic-Cultural Monument on February 23, 1972. The house has been depicted in exhibitions, such as a 1988 exhibit on Wright's textile-block houses at Barnsdall Art Park. In addition, New York's Museum of Modern Art displayed a replica of the house's exterior wall in a 1994 exhibit about Wright's work, and lighting sconces inspired by the house's architecture have been sold as well. A hanging lamp from the house was sold in the late 2010s for $36,000.

== See also ==
- List of Frank Lloyd Wright works
- Los Angeles Historic-Cultural Monuments in Hollywood
- National Register of Historic Places listings in Los Angeles
- Silver Pictures, founded by Joel Silver
