= Samuel Freeman House =

Historic house in Los Angeles, California

- U.S. National Register of Historic Places
- California Historical Landmark
- Los Angeles Historic-Cultural Monument
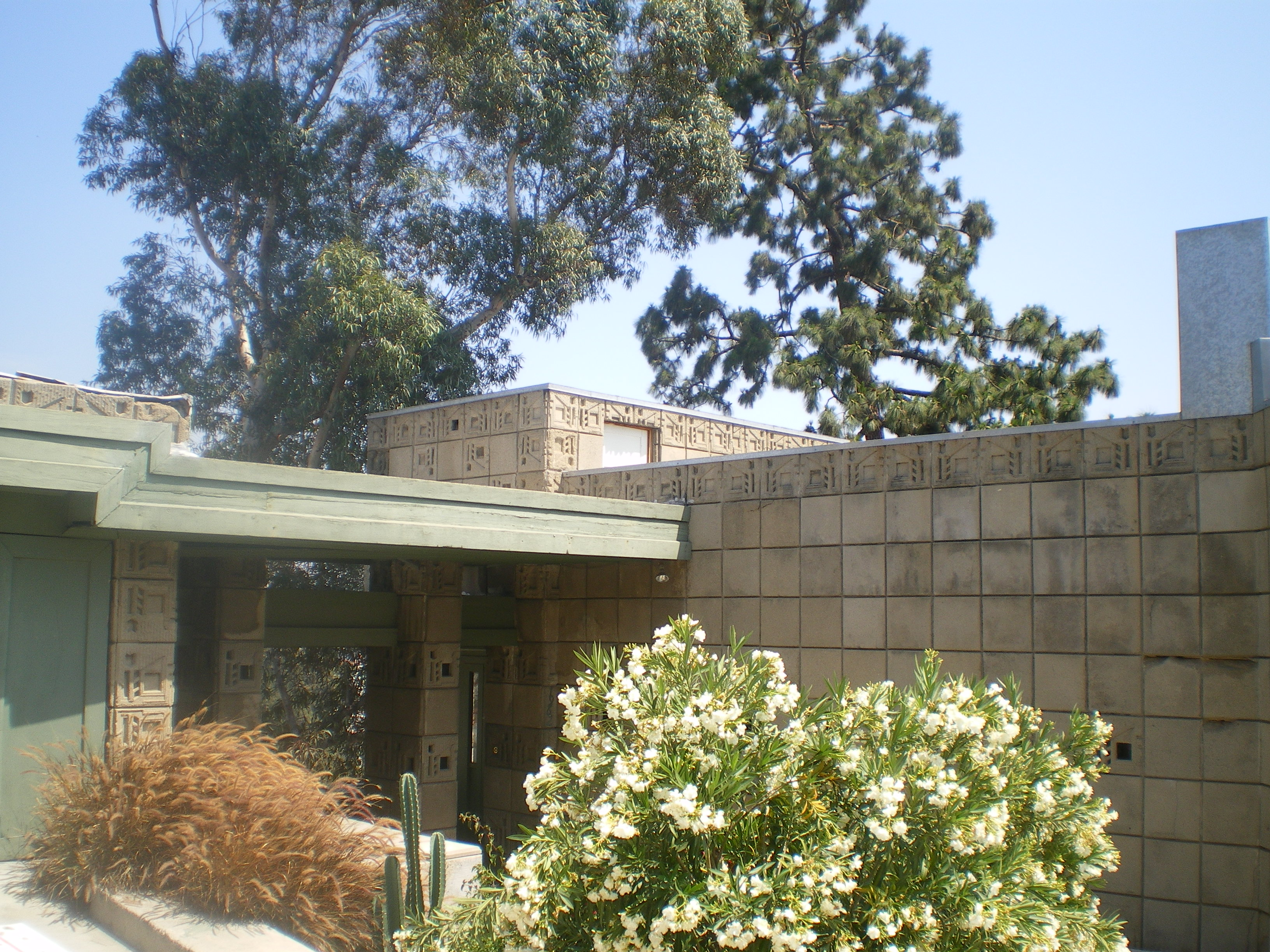
- Samuel Freeman House, 2008

- Location within the Los Angeles metropolitan area Location within California Location within the United States
- Location: 1962 Glencoe Way, Los Angeles, California, U.S.
- Coordinates: 34°06′20.4″N 118°20′19.0″W
- Built: 1924
- Architect: Frank Lloyd Wright
- Architectural style: Mayan Revival, Textile Block
- NRHP reference No.: 71000146
- CHISL No.: 1011
- LAHCM No.: 247

Significant dates
- Added to NRHP: October 14, 1971
- Designated LAHCM: November 25, 1981

The Samuel Freeman House (also known as the Samuel and Harriet Freeman House) is a house at 1962 Glencoe Way in the Hollywood Hills of Los Angeles in California, United States. Designed by Frank Lloyd Wright with a mixture of Islamic and Maya architectural elements, it was completed in 1925 for the jewelry salesman Sam Freeman and his wife Harriet, a teacher. The house is the smallest of four concrete textile block houses that Wright designed in Greater Los Angeles in the 1920s, the others being La Miniatura, the Storer House, and the Ennis House. The Freeman House is a Los Angeles Historic-Cultural Monument and California Historical Landmark, and it is listed on the National Register of Historic Places.

The Freeman House consists of an L-shaped structure with a detached garage, which sit on the slope of a hill. The exterior is built of 12,000 concrete textile blocks, which are alternately plain in design or decorated with engraved patterns. There are double-story corner windows and various terraces, including a rooftop terrace. Inside, the house has at least 2,500 square feet (230 m^{2}) of space, split across two levels. It has an inverted floor plan, with a kitchen and a living–dining room on the upper level, as well as two bedrooms on the lower level. Wright's protégé Rudolph Schindler designed most of the furniture, while Wright himself created some pieces. The house lacks a traditional foundation, instead being supported on textile-block retaining walls; the southern part of the house hangs above the hillside.

Sam and Harriet Freeman may have commissioned Wright to design the house after hearing about him through Harriet's sister. A new-building permit was issued in April 1924, and the structure was substantially completed in March 1925. The Freemans lived in the house for over a half-century, using it for avant-garde salons. After Sam died, Harriet donated the house in 1984 to the University of Southern California (USC), which tried to renovate it over the next four decades. The house had deteriorated over the years and was damaged further during the 1994 Northridge earthquake, and restoration efforts proceeded slowly during the late 20th and early 21st centuries. USC sold the house in 2022 to the real-estate developer Richard Weintraub.

== Site ==
The Freeman House is located at 1962 Glencoe Way, a dead-end street in the Hollywood Hills of Los Angeles, California, United States. Designed by Frank Lloyd Wright, the house is placed on the side of a hill. It occupies an irregular land lot sloping south toward the intersection of Franklin and Highland avenues, near Hollywood Boulevard. Wright's nearly-contemporary John Storer House and Ennis House were also built on hilltop sites; the writer Robert C. Twombly wrote that this made the houses look "seemingly impenetrable" from the street. The lot covers a total of 6,802 square feet (631.9 m^{2}); the house occupies the northern corner of the lot.

Immediately to the south is the Hollywood United Methodist Church and the Villa Bonita apartment building. Additionally, Magic Castle and the Yamashiro Villa are located slightly farther to the west, and the Highland Towers Apartments is located to the east across Highland Avenue. The surrounding neighborhood also has houses designed by architects such as Lloyd Wright and Rudolph Schindler (both protégés of Frank Lloyd Wright). The segment of Glencoe Way abutting the house was established in 1922, several years after the neighborhood was subdivided and just before the house was built. The street had not been paved when construction started.

== Architecture ==
The Freeman House is one of eight houses that Frank Lloyd Wright designed in Greater Los Angeles, alongside houses like the Millard House (La Miniatura), the Hollyhock House, the Storer House, and the Ennis House. (Note: Besides these houses, Wright's three other works in Greater Los Angeles are the Anderton Court Building in Beverly Hills, the Sturges House in Brentwood, and the Arch Oboler House's gatehouse on Mulholland Drive.) The Ennis, Freeman, Millard, and Storer houses were the only textile block houses he designed in Los Angeles. According to the writer Hugh Hart, "Wright saw his Textile Block Method approach as an utterly modern, and democratic, expression of his organic architecture ideal." Few of his clients ended up commissioning textile-block designs, given the novelty of the construction method. As The New York Times later said: "Aside from the free-spirited oil heiress Aline Barnsdall, whom he fought with constantly, his motley clients included a jewelry salesman [Samuel Freeman], a rare-book dealing widow [Alice Millard] and a failed doctor [John Storer]."

The Freeman House's style has been characterized as a blend of Islamic and Maya architecture. After designing the four textile-block houses, Wright went on to design various concrete-block buildings across the U.S., including Usonian houses made of "Usonian Automatic" blocks. The architect Jeffrey Chusid stated that the house's design had to encapsulate "the clearest, most efficient expression of [Wright's] ideas" due to the limited space available.

=== Exterior ===
==== Facade ====
The house's massing consists of a detached garage and an L-shaped house, the latter of which has a largely cubic form with mostly-square floor slabs. An open-air loggia originally connected the house and garage, though it was enclosed in the late 1920s or early 1930s. The exterior is made of 12,000 concrete textile blocks. (Note: Other sources give a figure of at least 11,000 blocks.) The blocks are made of materials taken from the site, such as sand, which may have been the source of the blocks' buff-colored tint. The typical block has square faces measuring 16 by 16 inches (410 mm × 410 mm) across. Although each block is 4 inches (100 mm) deep, the interiors of the blocks are hollow, meaning that the layer of concrete in each block is at most 2 inches (51 mm) thick. Mortar joints are placed between the blocks, which are fastened to each other using loops of steel; the blocks also contain steel rods. The "textile block" name is derived by the fact that the steel rods are integrated with the blocks to give the facade a knitted-together appearance.

Some of the textile blocks are plain, while others are engraved with motifs. The juxtaposition of plain and engraved blocks is the only ornamentation used on the house's facade. Since only one face of each engraved block contains decorations, the outer walls are made of two layers of blocks, with an air gap between them; this allowed both the interior and exterior faces of the walls to have engraved patterns. The engraved blocks' decorations are variously cited as depicting the site layout, an overlaid square and chevron, or a combination of the site plan and a eucalyptus tree. (Note: Sweeney 1994, p. 76, denies that there is any evidence that the blocks were intended to depict an organic pattern like a eucalyptus tree.) Sources disagree on how many types of blocks were used, although at least three types (a plain block and two variants of the engraved block) have been identified. The blocks on the southern facade are alternately protruded or recessed, and the blocks are laid in a more complex pattern as the facade ascends. The facade also includes vertical piers with alternating plain and engraved concrete blocks. Other parts of the facade contain perforated concrete blocks. The textile blocks absorbed moisture easily and were prone to decay because of impurities that existed when the blocks were cast.

Wrapping around the house's corners are two-story windows. The windows lack vertical mullions or other visible means of support at the corners, and the glass panes on each side of the corner are instead joined to each other directly. Mullions do exist elsewhere within these windows and are placed 16 inches (410 mm) apart. The windows, which extend from the lower level's floor slab to the soffit beneath the roof, were intended to create an open effect, giving the illusion that there are no corners. The Freeman House was one of Wright's first buildings to use such windows. The windows are interspersed between the concrete-block walls, which contain additional reinforcement. The primary facade along Glencoe Way generally lacks windows or other openings, which are instead clustered along the other facades. The main entrance is hidden away behind a wall that surrounds the house's garden.

==== Terraces and roof ====
The Freeman House lacks a traditional foundation because Wright wanted the house to appear to grow from the site. Instead, it has textile-block retaining walls and interior walls. The house is susceptible to earthquake damage due to its hillside location and the loose soil underneath; the southern end of the house is especially vulnerable.

In the rear are balconies overlooking Highland Avenue and the Hollywood neighborhood. According to one source, the balconies were intended to "extend and enhance the openness of interior spaces". South of the house, a retaining wall encloses a terrace, which stands on a layer of fill. Wright's initial plans called for several rectangular terraces and a semicircular retaining wall, but these were not built. These plans also called for an interior partition wall on the lower level to be extended outside of the house, down a flight of stairs, and into the terraces. Due to a scarcity of open space, the roof was originally designed as a terrace, but it seems to have been sparsely used by the Freeman family. The roof protrudes over the southern part of the house. The roof originally leaked because it lacked a flashing, which was added shortly after the house's completion.

=== Interior ===
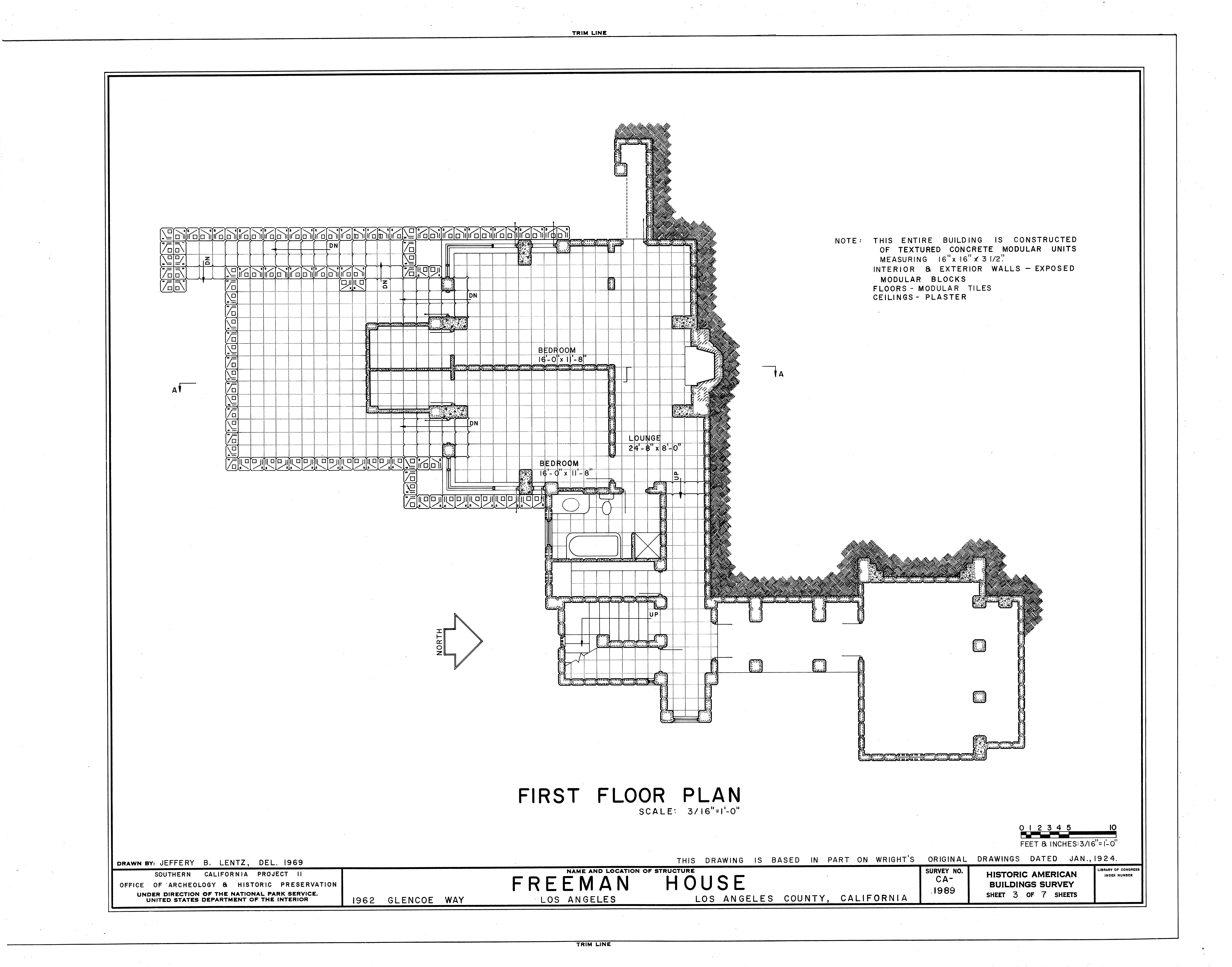
Drawing of the interior floor plan

The house is variously cited as having 2,500 square feet (230 m^{2}) or 2,884 square feet (267.9 m^{2}), (Note: Other sources give a significantly different figure of 1,200 square feet (110 m^{2}) or 1,500 square feet (140 m^{2}).) which is split across two levels. (Note: One source cites a figure of three levels.) The house has two bedrooms and was originally built with one bathroom; a second bathroom was added later on but was removed in a 2000 renovation. The interior is decorated with textile blocks bearing geometric motifs. Wright designed a small amount of furniture for the house, including two benches, shelves, and a dining table. The house mainly includes furniture designed by Wright apprentice Rudolph Schindler, who created either 35 or 60 pieces for the house. Although some original furnishings such as lamps remained in the 1990s, other pieces such as bookcases and chairs have been removed.

==== Upper level ====
Similar to other houses in Los Angeles with inverted floor plans, the kitchen and living–dining spaces are on the main floor, while the bedrooms are on the level below. The kitchen and bedrooms are small compared to contemporary houses. The house's entrance leads directly to a hallway that runs past the kitchen and living–dining space, which in turn abuts the perforated blocks on the facade. Because the perforated blocks do not have lights, the corridor is dark at night. A stair leads from the entrance hall to the house's lower level.

There is a fireplace hearth on the living–dining room's northern wall, which is surrounded by textured blocks and flanked by benches with shelves. The southern wall leads to a balcony, and there are wrap-around windows at the room's corners; both of these features were later used in Wright's other structures. Due to the design of the windows, the corners of the upper-story floor slab are cantilevered. The center of the living–dining room has a hardwood floor, while the perimeter of the room's floor is made of concrete blocks. Two piers separate the southern part of the living–dining room from the rest of the space. The room's ceiling consists of wooden joists placed 16 inches apart, the same width as the window panes and the floorboards. Part of the room's ceiling is raised to create a clerestory, which is illuminated by perforated blocks. There are two large I-beams running north to south across the living–dining room's ceiling, dividing the room into thirds. The southern third of the room has a lower ceiling than the rest of the space.

==== Lower level ====
Due to the site's steep slope, the northern half of the lower level is a below-grade basement, while the southern half is suspended above the hillside. The two bedrooms are on the south side of the house. The living–dining room's corner windows extend down into both of the lower-level bedrooms, which have concrete-block floors. There was originally a lounge connecting the bedrooms, which was removed by Schindler shortly after the house's completion. Aside from a fireplace on the north wall, the lounge was a narrow, dimly lit space. The lower level also includes closets for each bedroom, in addition to a bathroom. Under the garage was originally a storage room or laundry room, which has served as a guest suite since 1932. Beneath the southern half of the lower level is a mechanical crawl space surrounded by the house's foundation wall.

== History ==
The Freeman House was one of multiple high-profile projects that Wright completed in the 1920s, along with his other Los Angeles houses and Tokyo's Imperial Hotel. Wright had received the commissions for the Freeman, Ennis, and Storer houses nearly simultaneously, shortly after he had completed La Miniatura. The order in which the three houses was constructed is disputed. (Note: The order is unclear because the Freeman House was completed before the entire Ennis House was ready, but after part of the Ennis House had been opened. The Freeman House was completed in March 1925. The Ennis House's garage was finished in December 1924, but the main part of the Ennis House was not done until August 1925.) Wright's grandson Eric Lloyd Wright and Los Angeles Times reporter Charles Lockwood stated that the Freeman House was built last, while other sources described the Freeman House as having been built before the Ennis House and after the Storer House. Prior to constructing the textile-block houses, Wright had used pre-Columbian motifs in other structures such as Chicago's Midway Gardens and Richland Center, Wisconsin's German Warehouse.

=== Freeman ownership ===
Isometric view of the exterior

The house was commissioned for the Freeman family, a Jewish family from Los Angeles. Its first owners were Sam Freeman, a jewelry salesman, and his wife Harriet, a performing artist who worked as a teacher. Sam's Hungarian-immigrant family had moved to California from New York City when he was a teenager, while Harriet had been born to Lithuanian immigrants in Omaha, Nebraska. They had married in 1921, when Sam was 32 and Harriet was 31. The historian Robert Sweeney described the Freemans as the least wealthy of the four clients for whom Wright had designed textile-block houses in Los Angeles. Both Sam and Harriet were actively involved with left-wing political causes, and they were sometimes described as communists. Despite their long marriage, the couple did things separately, and each spouse had their own friends. The Los Angeles Times described Sam and Harriet as an "odd couple" who reportedly could spend years not talking to one another.

==== Development ====
The Freemans may have heard about the elder Wright from Harriet's sister Leah Lovell, an acquaintance of Aline Barnsdall, who owned the then-recently-completed Hollyhock House. According to the scholar Dean Harris, the Freemans may have liked Wright specifically for his polemical way of speaking. Wright completed a set of drawings during January 1924; the initial plans called for a structure with cantilevered design elements, such as a roof and floor, extending outward from vertical concrete piers. The next month, Wright made technical modifications to the plans. The Freeman family initially intended to spend $10,000 on the house, and Sam Freeman and Wright signed a contract on January 26, 1924. The Freemans set aside $9,100 for construction, and another $900 went toward Wright's architectural commission. The Freemans hired H. J. Wolff as the house's contractor on January 29, but Wolff never did any work on the house. Instead, work was delegated to Frank's son Lloyd; the Freemans claimed that there were various delays as a result of Lloyd's involvement.

The elder Wright signed another contract on February 26, agreeing to pay for any cost overruns should the project exceed its $10,000 budget. The new-building permit was issued on April 8. To create the blocks, workers mixed granite, sand, and gravel, and the resulting aggregate was then blended with Portland cement at a 4:1 ratio. The mixture was then blended with water and stirred until the mixture could stand up on its own. This material was then cast into aluminum molds, and the blocks were removed from the molds and left moist for weeks. Two molds, one a mirror image of the other, were used to produce the designs on the blocks; the molds measured 17 7/8 inches (450 mm) square and 4 7/8 inches (120 mm) thick. Byron Vandegrift manufactured many of the blocks on his own, sometimes constructing them by hand. Deliveries of materials were complicated by the fact that Glencoe Way was unpaved. Frank wrote to his son in September 1924, telling him that the land survey was flawed, and he asked Lloyd the next month to request more money from the Freemans. Lloyd responded that Sam Freeman did not have enough money, and by January 1925, work had stopped due to the Freemans' inability to pay. Wright blamed delays in the construction of the Freeman House and his other textile-block houses for increasing his already-considerable debt.

Contractors ended up placing 16 liens on the building. Wright helped Sam settle some of the liens, and Harriet later said that Sam eventually paid off the other liens. On March 23, 1925, Wright filed a notice of completion to indicate that all major work was finished. As with Wright's other textile-block buildings, the construction cost significantly exceeded its original budget because of the unusual construction methods that were used. The final cost is variously cited as $23,000 or $25,000, and the amount owed to Wright was quoted as $21,888.17. The quantity and cost of the blocks had both increased; although Wright had initially anticipated that the house would use 9,000 blocks each costing $0.30, it ended up using at least 11,000 blocks each costing $0.66. Sam later recalled that their friends regarded the house as outlandish and that "several carpenters actually walked off the job, because they didn't like the look of it".

==== Usage ====
Despite their different social circles, and amid rumors that Harriet and Schindler were romantically involved, the Freemans occupied the house for five decades. Sam allegedly wanted to move out of the house but was loath to divorce Harriet. The house was used for avant-garde salons, hosting many meetings of the Freemans' friend group over the years. The Freemans hosted several events for their friends, such as a wedding reception for the dancer Bella Lewitzky and another reception for the dancer Martha Graham. Other individuals who spent significant periods of time there included Schindler, Rudi Gernreich, Jean Negulesco, Galka Scheyer, Edward Weston, and Fritz Zwicky. During the 1950s, it hosted politically left-leaning individuals blacklisted by the House Un-American Activities Committee. The house's guest apartment was rented out to figures such as the musician Xavier Cugat, in addition to unemployed actors (who reportedly included Clark Gable) and blacklisted individuals.

Almost immediately after moving in, the Freemans found that the roofs were leaking and that the rebar in the concrete blocks was rusting; the roof leaks were attributed in part to a lack of drains. After using various pots and pans to catch the leaks, the Freemans asked Schindler to help fix the house. The Freemans subsequently patched the leaking roof and added metal flashing on the roof. Further complicating matters, the facade decayed extensively due to moisture problems aggravated by defects in the original construction, as the blocks were inconsistent in quality. Initially, they lacked the money to buy real furniture, so they instead sat on cardboard boxes. Eventually, they hired Schindler to design furniture. At one point, Wright drove by the house unannounced, saw the flashing, and angrily asked the Freemans "What have you done to my house?". The architect was reportedly even more aghast at seeing Schindler's furniture in the house. At other points, Wright had suggested several design changes such as a wooden ceiling and art-glass partition screens, but these were not implemented.

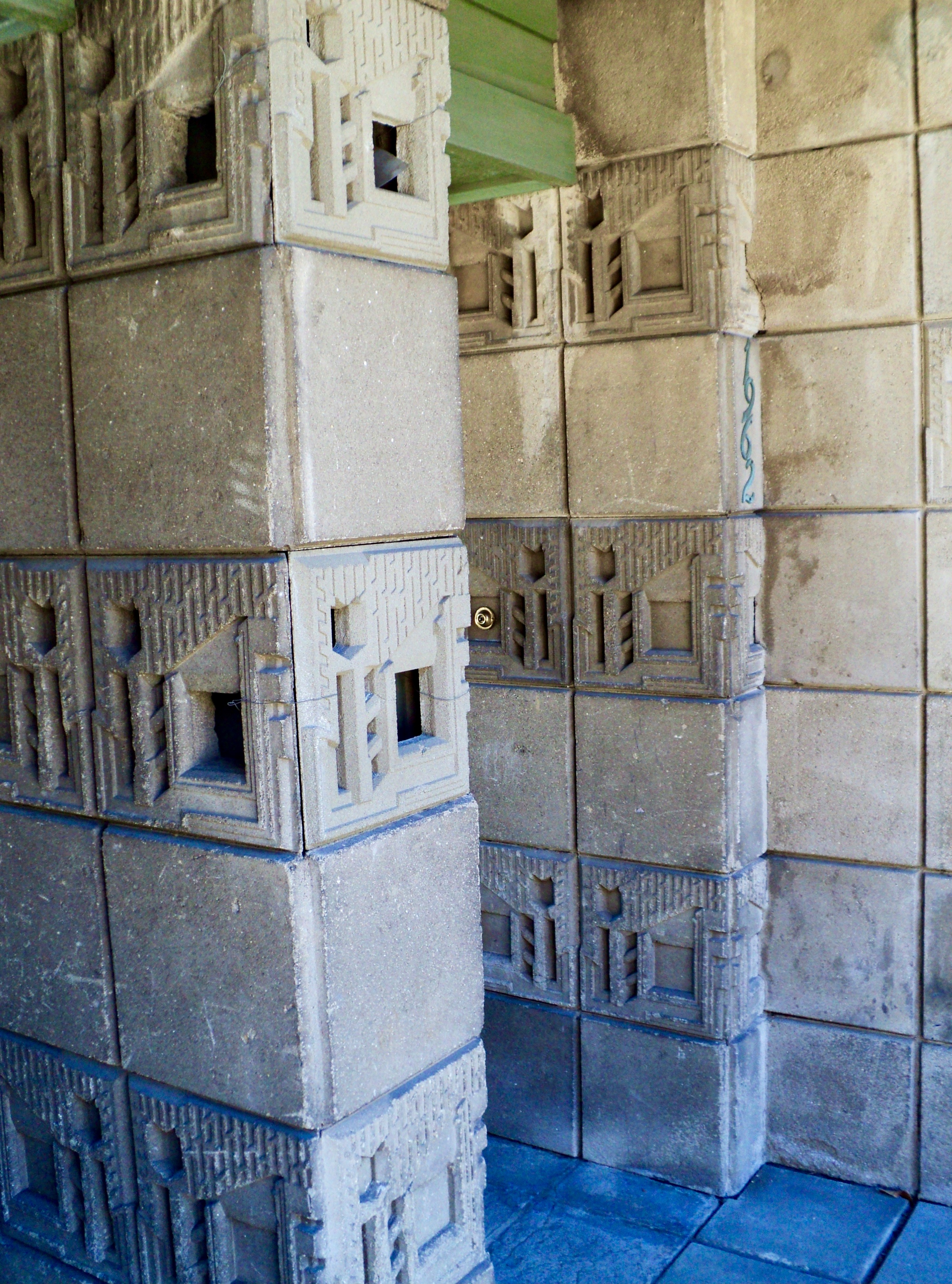
Architectural detail of the house

Over the years, Schindler devised multiple ad hoc solutions for the house's issues. Schindler was rehired to combine the lower-level lounge with one of the bedrooms c. 1928. The guest bedroom became Sam's private apartment, with a kitchenette, while the bedroom originally used by both Freemans became Harriet's alone. An acacia tree and boulders were added outside the house for extra privacy. In 1932, Schindler remodeled the room behind the garage, converting that space into a guest apartment. Around this time, a bathroom was added on the east side of the lower level, and the outdoor loggia was also enclosed. Sam retired in 1938 after receiving a substantial inheritance, and Schindler added heaters and modified the windows and dining table that year. Schindler also added shelves in the living area and installing plywood panels between the living–dining room and kitchen. The house's swimming pool became a garden in the mid-20th century. Additional changes to the furniture, windows, and roof were made in the 1950s, and the kitchen's windows and work table were modified in 1955.

Gregory Ain and John Lautner were also hired to modify the house over the years. Robert Clark renovated the kitchen in the late 1950s, and Lautner replaced the corner windows with steel-framed units at some point later on. The interiors were also repainted, and the doors were fixed throughout the years. The Los Angeles city government issued a building-alteration permit in 1980 for the installation of an elevator in the house, which was completed in 1982 for Harriet, whose mobility was decreasing. Sam lived in the house for the rest of his life; sources disagree on whether he died in 1978, 1980, or 1981. Harriet Freeman also lived there until her own death in 1986. The couple had no children to whom they could bequeath the property, and their two nephews did not want it.

=== USC ownership ===
==== 1980s and 1990s ====
In 1984, Harriet gave the house to the University of Southern California's (USC) School of Architecture, partly because the university had helped restore the Gamble House in Pasadena. She also gave USC $200,000 toward the house's restoration, and USC agreed to retain the Schindler–designed furniture as part of the donation. At the time, USC planned to raise another $500,000 for renovation, and it planned to use the house as a seminar space and a retreat for visiting architects. The building remained vacant, and the retreat plans did not come to pass. Due to various structural issues such as a leaky roof and damaged walls, the house was boarded up, and neighbors complained that the vacant house attracted trespassers. After the Getty Foundation announced in 1988 that it would give up to $320,000 per building for restoration projects in Los Angeles, USC received a $35,000 Getty grant to conduct studies and create drawings for the house's restoration. Martin Weil, who was also involved with the restoration of the Hollyhock and Storer houses, helped design the Freeman House's restoration.

A reporter at the Los Angeles Times wrote in the early 1990s that "Terraces are falling down the hillside, walls bulge and whole pieces of the house are separating from one another", in part due to flaws in its design. USC began providing tours of the house on Saturdays in 1992. The tours, which were intended to raise $1.6 million for renovations, marked the first time the house was ever opened to the general public. The Freeman House also hosted events such as a 1996 reception where Bella Lewitzky announced the disbanding of her dance company. The house sustained even more severe damage after the 1994 Northridge earthquake. Wooden shoring had to be added to the cracked walls; the interiors were water-damaged or covered with soot; and the textile blocks had rusted to the extent that some of the metal had popped out. USC preservationists also said that the house was not adequately reinforced and that the steel rebar was rusting. The house's curator at the time claimed that he could spray the facade at full blast all day "and not have a drop of water hit the ground". Joel Silver, who had considered buying the house before USC took over, criticized the university's restoration as insufficient, a complaint shared by several neighbors. The house was also reportedly neglected; one neighbor claimed that the house's doors were often unlocked or even wide open.

By 1996, USC had spent another $400,000 just stabilizing the structure, in addition to $40,000 per year in operating costs. Jeffrey Chusid, the house's director, moved out after resigning in 1997. USC requested $3.6 million from the Federal Emergency Management Agency (FEMA) during the late 1990s. The agency offered a $852,000 loan, which would have paid for foundation, facade, and stair repairs, but USC initially rejected the loan due to concerns that the funding would not pay for a full renovation. The university later agreed to take the loan and spend $500,000 of its own money as well. A full renovation of the building had been postponed due to funding uncertainties. Harriet's original $200,000 bequest had long since been used up, and USC did not want to sell the building because any new owner could not take over the FEMA loan. Though the house stopped offering public tours, it continued to be occupied by various USC architecture students. Robert Timme, the USC School of Architecture's dean, offered to sell the house to anyone with the means to fix it.

==== 2000s and 2010s ====
The Freeman House repair project experienced additional difficulties and delays in the 21st century. In 2000, workers began drilling 23 holes measuring up to 28 feet (8.5 m) deep, so they could install caissons to stabilize the house. USC moved the house's furnishings, including furniture and broken tiles to storage to prepare for the project. FEMA granted USC $750,000 for emergency repairs, and the Getty Trust provided another $60,000 to study the replacement of the blocks; the rest of the project was funded by USC. The stabilization work was completed in 2002, and the roof was replaced that year. Subsequently, USC students began replacing damaged blocks with newly-cast replicas. Plain concrete blocks were temporarily installed while the original blocks were being replaced or restored. Only one of the two original aluminum molds still existed, so Los Angeles Trade–Technical College students used computer-aided design software to create a replica of the other mold. In the meantime, USC officials debated how faithfully the house should be restored, and there were proposals to remove the Schindler-designed furniture.

Initial restoration work was finished in 2005; FEMA had granted $901,000 in total, while USC had raised another $1.5 million. The house continued to leak even after the roof was replaced. After the initial work was completed, USC undertook a more substantial renovation of the building, which was planned to last a decade. Work proceeded slowly due to a lack of funding, as well as changes in USC's leadership. In the meantime, USC gave tours and used the house as a construction laboratory. A USC official said in 2010 that workers were still trying to replace several hundred blocks and that they were still trying to determine the ideal ratios of materials for each block.

At some point in mid-2012, a pair of cast iron and brass floor lamps designed by Wright, as well as a cushioned folding chair and a tea cart designed by Schindler, had been stolen from a storage facility where they were placed after the 1994 Northridge earthquake. Although an employee noticed the theft in September 2012, it was not publicly reported, the Los Angeles Police Department did not receive a report of the theft until 2019, after a concrete block from the house was sold in an unrelated event in Chicago. The news of the theft prompted concerns about whether USC was properly maintaining the Freeman House. At the time, the house was still closed to the public and had no permanent director. The Los Angeles Times described the house as having "splintered wooden beams, peeling paint and gaps in the walls", and it was hard to visit the house in any case, as the neighboring section of Glencoe Way had limited parking and was a dead-end road.

=== Weintraub purchase ===
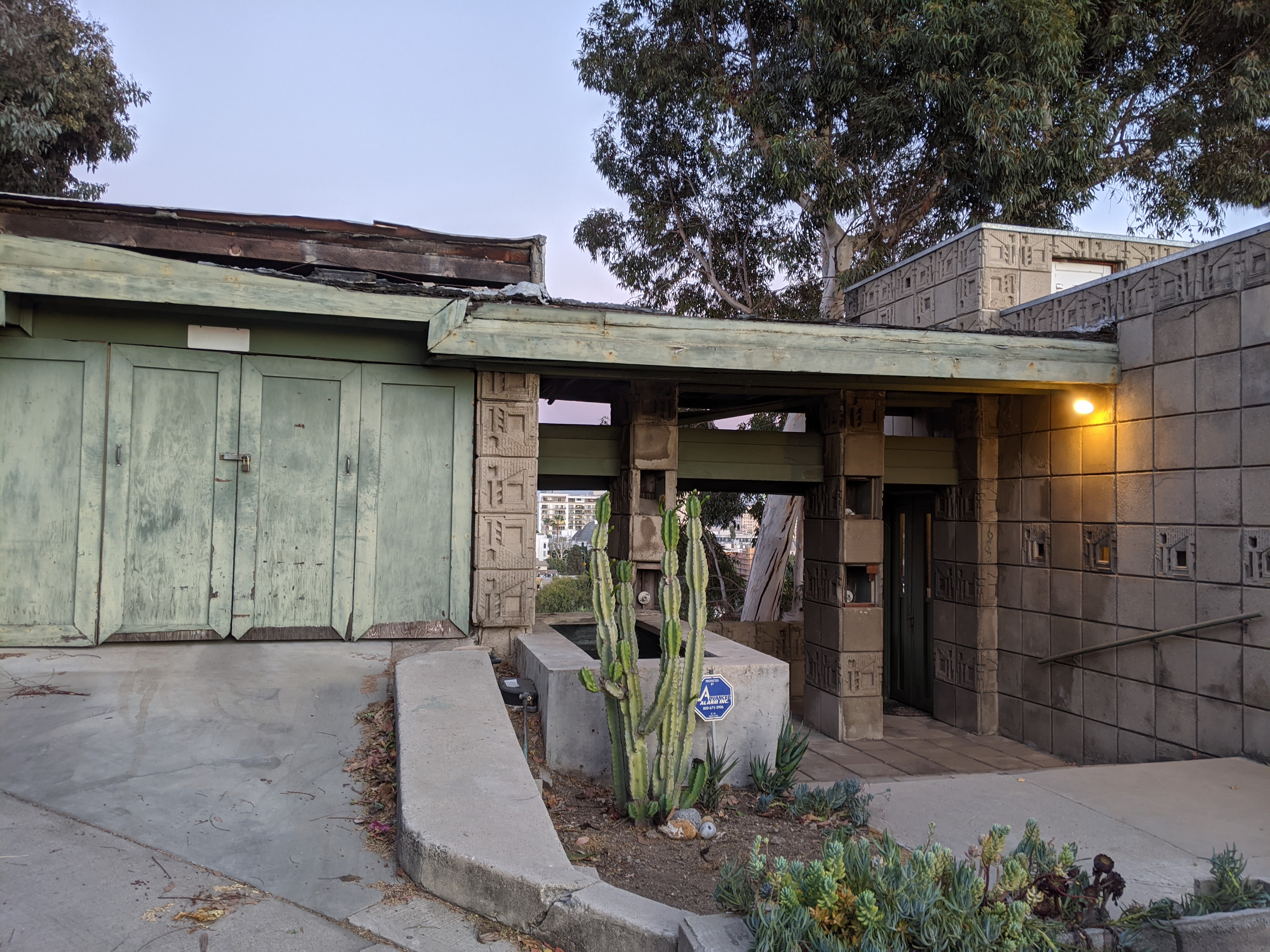
The loggia between the garage (left) and the house (right)

USC placed the house for sale in 2021 for $4.25 million. By then, the university was focusing on archival collections instead of house restorations, having given up the Gamble House two years previously. The asking price of the house was later reduced to $3.25 million. The next year, USC sold the house for $1.8 million to the real-estate developer Richard Weintraub. The low purchase price was attributed to the fact that the house still needed extensive repairs. The transaction was the first time in the house's history that it had been sold, as the only other change of ownership (when USC acquired the building) had been a donation. The terms of the sale included an easement preserving much of the existing design features, and Weintraub was also required to open the house for public tours at least four times annually.

== Impact ==
A writer for the Los Angeles Times wrote in 1947 that the Freeman House had "lost nothing in desirability with the passage of time", in spite of common concerns about modern architecture. John Pastier stated in 1974 that the Freeman House and Wright's other textile-block designs in Los Angeles "successfully demonstrate Wright's special powers of expression and innovation". Aaron Betsky wrote in 1992 that "Everywhere you go, you are made aware of the site", because Wright had arranged the interior so as to subtly guide visitors in various directions. Observers have also written about the contrast between bright and dark spaces throughout the house.

One of Wright's biographers, Brendan Gill, characterized the house as "an experiment in vertical cubage". The architectural writer Kathryn Smith described the Freeman House as among Wright's 20 most historically significant projects, calling it "the missing link between two World Heritage sites: Taliesin and Fallingwater". The historian Robert Winter, in a guidebook about Los Angeles architecture, said: "To have seen the Freeman House above the Methodist Church is to have reached Mecca!", in reference to the church directly south of the house. The writer Robert Sweeney described the design as flawed in several respects but that the architectural features "combine to produce an architecture that anticipates the future, rather than recalling the past". Another Wright historian, Robert McCarter, wrote that the Freeman House was the culmination of Wright's efforts to resolve "the spatial and constructive forms inherent" in his textile-block houses. The biographer Meryle Secrest wrote that all of Wright's textile-block houses were "monumental, aloof and irresistibly Mayan in feeling".

Unlike Wright's other houses, the Freeman House has not been depicted in many works of media, despite its proximity to Hollywood. An exhibit about Wright's Los Angeles designs, including the Freeman House, was hosted at Barnsdall Art Park in 1988. Jeffrey Chusid, the house's onetime director, wrote the book Saving Wright in 2011, detailing the house's development and history. In addition, a 3,200-page, multi-volume set of books published in 2014 documented a five-year program of studying the history and condition of the house. The house is designated as California Historical Landmark number 1011. It is also listed on the National Register of Historic Places and labeled as a Los Angeles Historic-Cultural Monument.

== See also ==
- List of Frank Lloyd Wright works
- Los Angeles Historic-Cultural Monuments in Hollywood
- List of Registered Historic Places in Los Angeles
- Hollywood Heights, Los Angeles
