= Medical Council =

Medical Council is the name of the regulatory body that grants medical licenses in many countries. Specifically, it may refer to:

- Australian Medical Council, a national standards advisory body for medical education and mental health medication and education
- General Medical Council, the regulator of the medical profession in the United Kingdom
- Medical Council of Ireland, the regulator of the medical profession in the Republic of Ireland
- Medical Council of Canada, an examining body in Canada
- Medical Council of India, a constitutional body in India set up primarily to establish uniform standards of higher qualifications in medicine
- Medical Council of Iran, the licensing and regulatory body for Iranian healthcare professionals
- Medical Council of Jamaica, a licensing body in Jamaica
- Medical Council of New Zealand
- Medical Council of Thailand, a national standards advisory body for medical education and training, and regulator of the medical profession at the same time
- Pakistan Medical & Dental Council
- Singapore Medical Council, one of the statutory boards of the Singapore Government
- Sri Lanka Medical Council

== See also ==
- Medical Research Council (disambiguation)
