= MRC =

MRC may refer to

== Government ==
- Mail recovery center, or postal dead letter office
- Medical Research Council (disambiguation), several national medical research organizations, including:
  - Medical Research Council (United Kingdom)
- Medical Reserve Corps, a US network of volunteer organizations
- Military Revolutionary Committee, in revolutionary Russia
- Mississippi River Commission, a federal U.S. organization for managing the river
- Municipalité régionale de comté (regional county municipality), Quebec, Canada
- Virginia Marine Resources Commission

== Organizations, companies, education ==
- EmArcy Records, an American record label (name derived from initials of Mercury Record Company)
- Malaysian Red Crescent Society, a humanitarian organisation
- Media Research Center, a US organization
- Media Rating Council, a US organization
- Medicare Rights Center, a US nonprofit organization
- Mekong River Commission, an inter-governmental organization to manage water resources among three countries
- Melbourne Recital Centre, an Australian music venue and organization
- Mendocino Redwood Company, an American forest products company
- Menzies Research Centre, an Australian political right of centre think tank
- Modern Records Centre, University of Warwick, British archive service
- Mount Royal College, now Mount Royal University
- MRC (company), US media company
- MRC Centre for Global Infectious Disease Analysis

== Politics ==
- Mombasa Republican Council, a Kenyan separatist organization
- Movement for the Rehabilitation of Citizens–Rurenzangemero, a Burundi political party
- Mouvement républicain et citoyen (Citizen and Republican Movement), a French political party
- Mouvement Révolutionnaire Congolais (Congolese Revolutionary Movement), a rebel group in the Democratic Republic of the Congo

== Sports ==
- Manchester Rugby Club, England
- Marista Rugby Club, Argentina
- Melbourne Racing Club, Australia
- Montreal Rowing Club, Canada
- Mosman Rowing Club, Sydney, Australia

== Science and technology ==
- .mrc, the common file extension for mIRC scripts
- Maximal-ratio combining, a method of encoding signals in telecommunications
- Memory Recall, a function key on a calculator
- Memory Reference Code, a component of Intel computer firmware
- Minimum resolvable contrast, a measurement associated with imaging devices
- Mixed raster content, a method of image compression
- Molonglo Reference Catalogue of Radio Sources, an astronomical catalogue
- MRC (file format), originally created for storing electron microscopy data
- Multiple regression/correlation, a statistical method

== Other uses ==
- Maricopa (Amtrak station), Arizona, US, code MRC
- Morocco, ITU code MRC
- Maricopa language, ISO 639 code mrc
- M. R. Chandrasekharan (born 1929), Indian literary critic
- Multi-Racing Championship, a Nintendo 64 video game

== See also ==
- Mr. C (disambiguation)
