= Mr. C (disambiguation) =

Mr. C is the moniker for British DJ, music producer and rapper Richard West.

Mr. C may also refer to:

== People ==
- Mr. C, a nickname of American singer Perry Como
- Mr. C The Slide Man, an alias of American DJ and songwriter DJ Casper

== Characters ==
- Mr. C, the nickname of Howard Cunningham, a starring character on the TV series Happy Days
- Mr. C, the nickname of Gordon Cunningham, a character on the TV soap opera Hollyoaks
- Mr. C, a character representing the letter C from the children's television series The Letter People
- Mr. C, the mascot of the Vanderbilt University Commodores
- Mr. C, one of two doppelgängers of Dale Cooper featured in Twin Peaks: The Return

== See also ==
- Mr. Cee (born 1966), American Hip Hop DJ
- MR-C (Modular Rifle - Caseless), a mockup of an assault rifle
- C (disambiguation)
- MRC (disambiguation)
