= Medical Council of Jamaica =

Jamaican licensing body for physicians

The Medical Council of Jamaica is the licensing body for doctors in Jamaica.

Doctors in Jamaica are required to take continuing medical education courses to keep their licences.

In 2004, amendments to the country's Medical Act (Jamaica) increased the number of non-doctors on the council.

The Medical Council's chairman is Dr John Hall, a consultant neurologist and former chairman of the department of medicine at the Kingston Public Hospital in Kingston, Jamaica.

The Medical Association of Jamaica, a different organisation, is the voluntary professional and advocacy body for doctors in Jamaica.
