= Textile block house =

Building method created by Frank Lloyd Wright

Isometric rendering of the Samuel Freeman House, showcasing its textile block construction

The textile block system is a unique structural building method created by Frank Lloyd Wright in the early 1920s. While the details changed over time, the basic concept involves patterned concrete blocks reinforced by steel rods, created by pouring concrete mixture into molds, thus enabling the repetition of form. The blocks are then stacked to build walls.

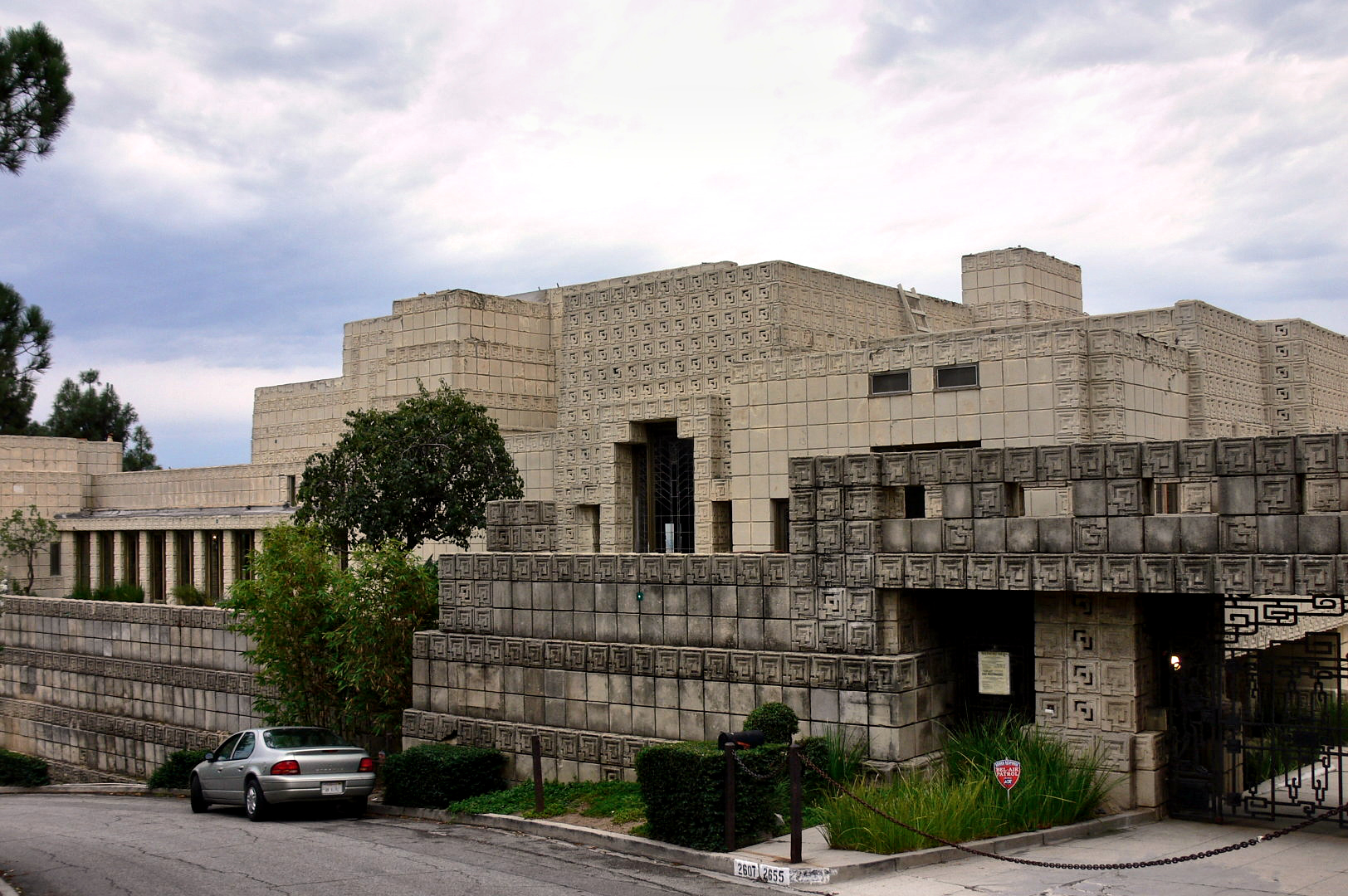
Front view of the Ennis House, for which Wright was the architect.

== List ==
Wright's textile block houses are:

- Ennis House
- Robert and Rae Levin House (check also the other Michigan - Galesburg and Parkwin/Kalamazoo - houses at List of Frank Lloyd Wright works)
- Millard House
- Samuel Freeman House
- John Storer House (Los Angeles)
- Westhope, located in Tulsa, Oklahoma
- Arizona Biltmore Hotel (considered a collaboration with Albert Chase McArthur)

== See also ==
- List of Frank Lloyd Wright works
