= Medical license =

Occupational license that permits a person to legally practice medicine

A medical license is an occupational license that permits a person to legally practice medicine. In most countries, a person must have a medical license bestowed either by a specified government-approved professional association or a government agency before they can practice medicine. Licenses are not granted automatically to all people with medical degrees. A medical school graduate must receive a license to practice medicine to legally be called a physician. The process typically requires testing by a medical board. The medical license is the documentation of authority to practice medicine within a certain locality. An active license is also required to practice medicine as an assistant physician, a physician assistant or a clinical officer in jurisdictions with authorizing legislation.

A professional may have their license revoked if they are not deemed fit to practise, due to reasons including a lack of competence, health reasons, or ethical violations. The license will limit a professional's scope of practice. Medical licensure can create cartels.

== Canada ==
Canada requires that applicants have graduated from a school registered in the World Directory of Medical Schools, and apply to sit the Medical Council of Canada Qualifying Examination. Licenses are issued by Provincial bodies. A brief history of medical licensing in Ontario and Quebec, with a list of physicians licensed prior to 1867, is available at David Crawford's website. An article from 2013 says of the road to licensing in Canada, "residency training, licensure and employment promises to remain a difficult road to navigate". This emphasizes that there are a number of barriers that doctors face when it comes to practicing, yet there is a very high demand for doctors.

== China ==
Medical practitioners in China started to be licensed for the first time when Law of the People's Republic of China on Medical Practitioners passed on June 26, 1998. The law, which came into effect May 1, 1999, requires all newly graduated medical students to sit the National Medical Licensing Examination, regulated by the National Medical Examination Center, and then register with the local regulatory body. The two-part exam includes a Clinical Skill (CS) test and a General Written (GW) test. The candidates must pass the CS test to take the GW test. Each year, the CS is held in July, followed by the GW in September. The medical practitioners on the job who had obtained a primary medical qualification (i.e., Bachelor of Medicine) prior to law are not required to sit the exam and can directly be licensed.

== Colombia ==
The Instituto Colombiano para el Fomento de la Educación Superior (ICFES) and the Ministry of Education regulate the medical schools that are licensed to offer medical degrees. After completing all the schools' requirements to obtain a medical degree, physicians must serve the "obligatory social service" (in rural areas, research, public health or special populations e.g., orphan children), which usually lasts one year. After completing the social service, a doctor obtains a "medical registration" at the governor's office (Gobernación) of the Department (province/state) where they served the obligatory term. This registration is the same as a license in other countries, and authorizes the physician to practice medicine anywhere in the national territory. However, to practice in other departments requires an inscription from that department. Unlike the US, there is no official licensing exam for medical graduates in Colombia, since this responsibility is delegated to medical schools that have permission to confer medical degrees.

== Germany ==
In Germany, licensing of doctors ("Approbation") is the responsibility of the state governments. Licensed doctors are compulsory members of "Ärztekammern" (literally: "Physician chambers"), which are medical associations organized on state level. Criteria for licensing of doctors are regulated in the Approbationsordnung für Ärzte, which is a piece of federal law. According to the licensing regulations, the physician must have successfully completed his medical studies and passed the (final) examination. He or she must not have engaged in negative behavior that would raise clear concerns about his or her suitability (e.g., practicing a criminal offense). Furthermore, the physician must meet the health requirements and have sufficient German language skills to be able to perform the profession.

Physicians who have not studied medicine in Germany, among others, must prove their language skills by means of a German B2 certificate and a successfully completed Fachsprachprüfung. In addition, doctors who have not studied in the EU, EEA or Switzerland must prove that their studies are equivalent. For this purpose, they usually have to pass a Kenntnisprüfung (test of competence).

== India ==
In India, certification requires that a medical school graduate pass the final MBBS examination and undergo a one-year internship in a hospital recognised by the National Medical Commission erstwhile Medical Council of India. Foreign medical graduates must take the Foreign Medical Graduates Examination (FMGE), conducted by the National Board of Examinations (NBE). They can practice medicine throughout the country after certifying themselves as per Indian Medical Council Act, 1956. Doctors registered with any one state medical council are automatically included in the Indian Medical Register and thereby entitled to practice medicine anywhere in India. The MCI Ethics Committee observed in a meeting held on September 2, 2004, that, "There is no necessity of registration in more than one state medical council because any doctor, who has registered with any state medical council is automatically registered in the Indian Medical Register and also by virtue of Section 27 of the IMC Act, 1956, a person, whose name is included in the IMR, can practice anywhere in India." The Registered Doctors with various State Medical Councils across India up to the year 2019 can be checked in the Medical Council of India's Indian Medical Registry official website. National Medical Commission proposes a single licence for doctors to practise across India Once a doctor is registered by the State Medical Council and allotted a Unique Identification (UID) number by the Ethics and Medical Registration Board, they will not need fresh registration or a separate licence to practise in another State or Union Territory.

== UK ==
The term "medical license" is US-centric terminology. In the UK and in other Commonwealth countries the analogous instrument is called registration; i.e., being on the register or being/getting struck off (the register). The General Medical Council is the regulatory body for doctor's licensing in the UK. Currently, there are two types of basic registration: "Provisional Registration" and "Full Registration", and two types of specialty registration: "Specialist Registration" and "GP registration". In November 2009, the GMC introduced the "licence to practise", and it is required by law that to practice medicine in the UK, all doctors must be registered and hold a license to practice. The registration information for all doctors holding a license in the UK is available online at the GMC website.

== United States ==
In the United States, medical licenses are usually granted by individual states. Only those with medical degrees from schools listed in the World Directory of Medical Schools are permitted to apply for medical licensure. Board certification is a separate process.

The federal government does not grant licenses. A physician practicing in a federal facility, federal prison, US Military, and/or an Indigenous Reservation may have a license from any state, not just the one they are residing in. The practice of "tele-medicine" has made it common for physicians to consult or interpret images and information from a distant location. Some states have special licensure for this. The licensure process for most physicians takes between three and six months, due to the extensive background checks, educational, training, and historical primary source verifications.

=== History ===
The Tenth Amendment to the Constitution became the underpinning for the entire medical licensing system. Following several years of discussion and debate, the states' ratification of this amendment as part of the Bill of Rights concluded on December 15, 1791. It explicitly avowed that powers not granted to the federal government, nor prohibited to the states by the Constitution. The Tenth Amendment remains a living codification of states rights and is routinely cited by state medical boards today to justify the authority delegated to them by their state legislatures. In 1811, Ohio passed legislation licensing physicians but repealed these laws in 1833. In 1817, Illinois legislated the medical practice, but had repealed these laws by 1826.

The American Medical Association when formed in 1847, proposed that the state legislate medicine (rather than each of the different medical schools). Horowitz argues that this suggestion was made in order to gain greater control over medical education.

In the 1870s, almost all U.S. physicians were still unlicensed. The majority of physicians had M.D. degrees earned in American medical schools. The rest were mostly either homeopaths or eclectics. Homeopaths were trained in a pseudoscientific system known as homeopathy that had been developed by Samuel Hahnemann. Eclectics physicians also attended medical schools, but their practice mixed mainstream medicine with Thomsonsianism, a system of herbalism. Each of these groups was organized into both national and state medical societies across the United States.

In 1877, the Illinois legislature passed the Illinois medical licensing law, which led to the aggressive prosecution of physicians that were perceived as illegal or unethical. Medical boards of other states (often composed of both regular and irregular physicians) followed suit. Some authors claim that these efforts allowed organized regular and irregular physicians to exclude not only fraudulent practitioners, but other groups, including midwives, clairvoyants, osteopaths, Christian Scientists, and magnetic healers.

In 1889, Dent v. West Virginia, the U.S. Supreme Court for the first time upheld a state physician licensing law. A practitioner with insufficient credentials to obtain a medical license sued West Virginia, claiming a violation of his rights under the Due Process Clause of the Fourteenth Amendment. The Supreme Court upheld the statute noting that, while each citizen had a right to follow any lawful calling, they were subject to reasonable state restrictions. Because of the nature of medical training, the large amount of knowledge required, and the life-and-death circumstances with which physicians dealt, patients needed to rely on the assurance of a license requiring physicians to meet a minimum set of standards.

In 1956, the Federation of State Medical Boards released a report entitled "A Guide to the Essentials of a Modern Medical Practice Act". The report distilled a series of recommendations that addressed five core areas: the definition of the practice of medicine; eligibility standards for licensure; licensing examinations; licensure endorsement; and the bases for probation, suspension, or revocation of a license. Since its initial publication in 1956, the Essentials of a Modern Medical Practice Act has passed through thirteen updated editions, with the most recent in 2012.

By the beginning of the 20th century most states had implemented licensing laws. During the 20th century, medical boards sought to eliminate diploma mills by expanding their requirements for medical schools. They started to dictate the length and type of education required for licensing. As early as 1910, all but 12 states excluded physicians from medical practice if their schools were not found to be in "good standing". Between 1910 and 1935, more than half of all American medical schools merged or closed, in some part due to all state medical boards gradually adopting and enforcing the Flexner Report's recommendations on having all schools connected to universities.

Today, physicians are amongst the most highly regulated professionals with detailed criteria for licensing established by medical boards in each state, however, lack of discretionary action against physician misconduct by state medical boards has been criticized in recent years for their failure to discipline physicians, despite several consumer concerns and complaints.

=== Criticism ===
According to a 1979 article in the Journal of Libertarian Studies, the enactment of U.S. state medical licensing laws in the late 1800s was for the primary purpose of reducing competition and allowing physicians to make more money. The added benefit of public safety made restrictive licensure laws more appealing to both physicians and legislators. Infrequently mentioned in the literature, is that the "public safety" that is created by reducing the number of practitioners only extends to the patients who receive medical care. Thus, the overall effect is more expensive and higher-quality medical care for fewer patients.

Beyond the more general criticisms of occupational licensing that licensing increases costs and fails to improve quality, licensing in the medical profession specifically has been criticized as failing to enforce the standard practices they are charged with enforcing. In 1986, Inspector General at the United States Department of Health and Human Services said that medical boards took "strikingly few disciplinary actions" for physician misconduct. There have been a number of cases involving patient deaths where physicians only had their licenses removed years after multiple wrongful patient deaths had happened. State medical boards have increased the number of disciplinary actions against physicians since the 1980s.

Also, it has been said that because hospitals have had more legal burden placed on them in recent decades, they have more of an incentive to require that their physicians be competent. Thus, the process whereby physicians are reviewed and licensed by the state medical board results in some duplicate evaluations. The physician is evaluated both in the licensure process and then again by the hospital for the purpose of credentialing and granting hospital privileges.

Laws in some states prohibit interstate telemedicine without a license to practice in the state where the patient is located. According to the Cato institute, this reduces access to care.

=== Patient protection ===
State medical boards cannot assure a high standard of care, they do not review physicians on a regular basis, nor do they evaluate clinicians at the point of care. It is provider liability that results in oversight that protects consumers, and even that is imperfect. Before they employ or associate with individual physicians, via credentialing and privileging, providers confirm the training, knowledge and skills needed to take on relevant tasks. They review any sanctions and malpractice claims. There are cases where physician liability has been stripped by federal regulations, with adverse impacts, as on an Indian Reservation. Medical professional liability insurance companies deny problems physicians malpractice insurance or limit their practice.

== See also ==
- Medical Council
- Clinical officer – Gazetted officer and mid-level health care provider
