= Medical Association of Jamaica =

Jamaican medical organization

The Medical Association of Jamaica evolved from the British Medical Association Jamaica Branch which was constituted as the first overseas branch of the British Medical Association in 1877. It has over 2000 members, including students.

The Association celebrated its Golden Jubilee as an independent organisation in June 2015.
