= Medical Research Council =

Medical Research Council may refer to:

- Medical Research Council (Canada), forerunner of the Canadian Institutes of Health Research
- Medical Research Council (Ireland), forerunner of the Health Research Board
- Medical Research Council (United Kingdom), responsible for coordinating and funding medical research in the United Kingdom.
- National Health and Medical Research Council, Australia's peak funding body for medical research
- South African Medical Research Council, a state medical research organization in South Africa

== See also ==
- Medical Council
