= Charles Lockwood (author) =

American writer and business consultant

- Born: August 31, 1948 Washington, D.C.
- Died: March 28, 2012 Topanga, California
- Occupation: Author

Website
- bricksandbrownstone.com

Charles Lockwood (August 31, 1948 – March 28, 2012) was an American writer and consultant on green business strategies. Born in Washington, D.C., Lockwood received a Bachelor's degree from the Woodrow Wilson School of Public and International Affairs at Princeton University, in 1970.

== Career ==
As a historian and journalist from 1970 to 1985, he has written articles for The New York Times, Society of Architectural Historians, Smithsonian, and other publications, ranging from architecture and real estate to urban history. During these 15 years, he wrote six books on U.S. architecture and cities. In 1973, he received a Guggenheim Fellowship.

Lockwood became a real estate consultant in 1985. He provided consulting services to architectural firms, real estate companies, and professional services firms. During this period until 2003, he continued to publish articles on architecture and real estate, for major publications including The New York Times and The Wall Street Journal. He co-authored (with Christopher B. Leinberger) two cover stories for the Atlantic Monthly: "How Business is Reshaping America" - which identified the emergence of “urban villages”, also known as “edge cities"—mixed-use suburban developments, and "Los Angeles Comes of Age" in 1988, which he discussed Los Angeles’ emergence as a major world city.

Starting in 2003, Lockwood advised clients on corporate sustainability issues, and was a regular keynote speaker. His article “Building the Green Way” was published in the June 2006 Harvard Business Review.

== Selected works ==
- Charles Lockwood. (2003). The Green Quotient: Insights from Leading Experts on Sustainability. Washington, D.C.: Urban Land Institute. ISBN 978-0-87420-121-5. This book consists of Lockwood's conversations with U.S. and international thinkers about sustainability for the business world and the built environment. Some are experts like three-time Pulitzer-winner Thomas L. Friedman.
- Charles Lockwood (1978). Suddenly San Francisco: The Early Years of an Instant City. San Francisco Examiner Division of the Hearst Corp. ISBN 0-89395-004-1.

- Charles Lockwood. Color plates by Madeleine Isom. (2003). Bricks and Brownstone: The New York Row House, 1783-1929 (2nd ed.). New York: Rizzoli. ISBN 0-8478-2522-1. An architectural and social history. First published by McGraw-Hill in 1972.
- "Building Green Takes Root". The Wall Street Journal Green Special Section. October 29, 2007.
- "The Blue-Collar Green-Building Boom". Harvard Business Review. May 2008.
- "Building the Green Way". Harvard Business Review. June 2006.
