= A. D. German Warehouse =

Warehouse in Richland Center, Wisconsin

- U.S. National Register of Historic Places
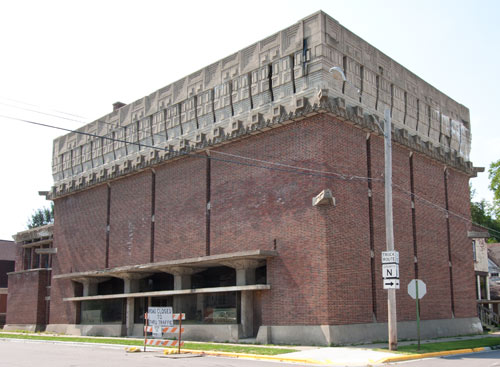

- Location within Wisconsin Location within the United States
- Location: Richland Center, Wisconsin
- Coordinates: 43°20′0″N 90°23′4″W
- Built: 1921
- Architect: Frank Lloyd Wright
- Architectural style: Mayan Revival
- NRHP reference No.: 74000122
- Added to NRHP: December 31, 1974

The A. D. German Warehouse is a Frank Lloyd Wright–designed Mayan Revival warehouse that was constructed in Richland Center, Wisconsin in 1921. Wright was born in Richland Center in 1867. The building is on the National Register of Historic Places.

== History ==
Wright designed the warehouse in lieu of a required bill payment to Albert Delvino German. Designed for "storing and selling wholesale goods", the space was to include a "teahouse restaurant, retail shops, and an art gallery." Construction on the building began in 1917 with completion in 1921. Facing one of the main streets in Richland Center, the building is mostly concrete, veneered in brick with a Mayan-inspired concrete frieze "derived from masks of the rain-god Chac".

The building exceeded its original construction estimate and later housed a gift shop, tearoom, art gallery and the Frank Lloyd Wright Museum under then-owner Harvey Glazner. Glazner, who died in March 2011, had kept the lower floor of the building as the shop and Frank Lloyd Wright Museum, but the building was not consistently open to the public.

In 2013, Glenn Schnadt bought the building. In November 2015, the A.D. German Warehouse Conservancy (ADGWC) hired Isthmus Architecture, Inc., preservation specialists from Madison, Wisconsin. A condition assessment was performed and preservation plan was created for the building in 2017.

Tours of the building are available May–October by appointment through the ADGWC.

== Gallery ==
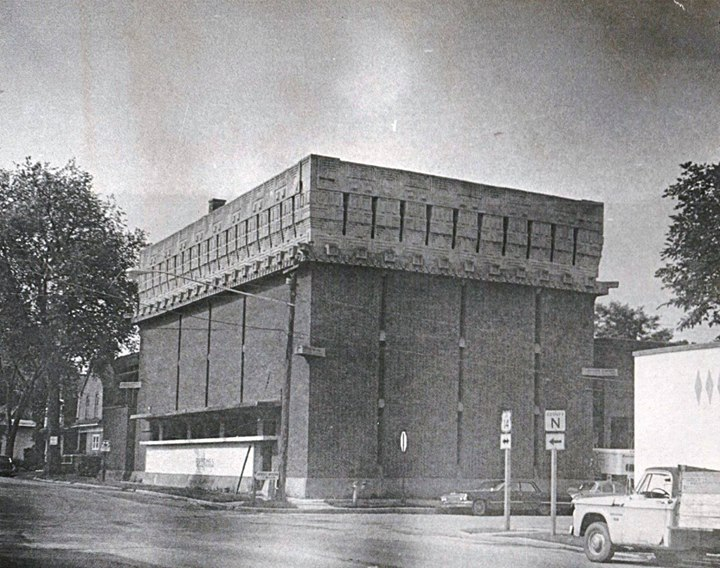
A.D. German Warehouse circa 1975-1976

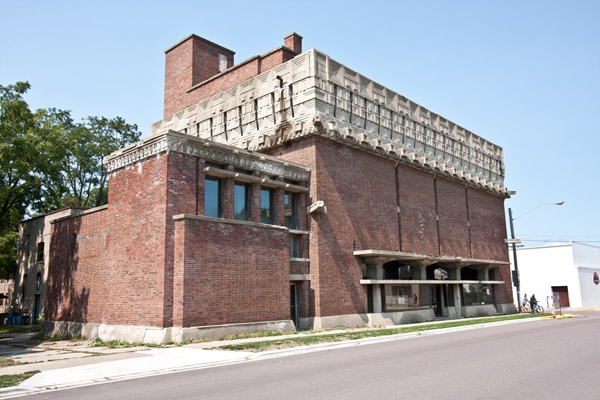
View from SE

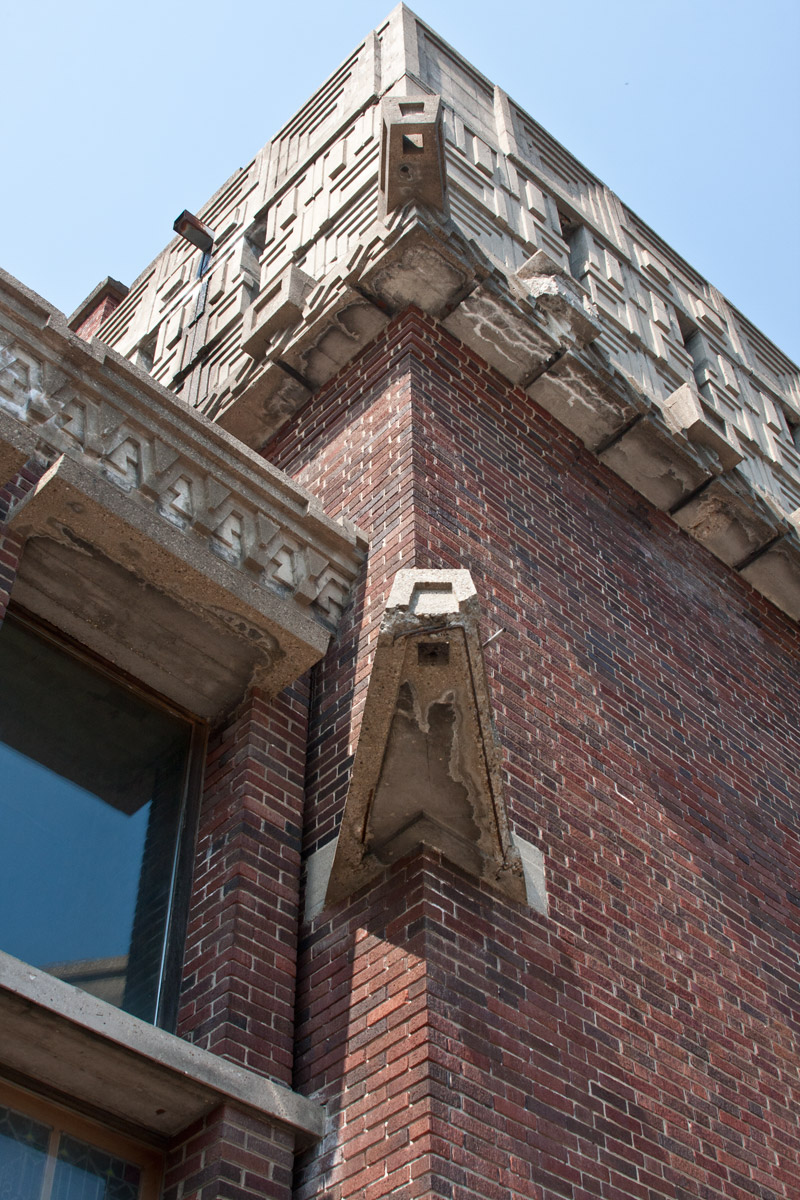
Architectural appointments

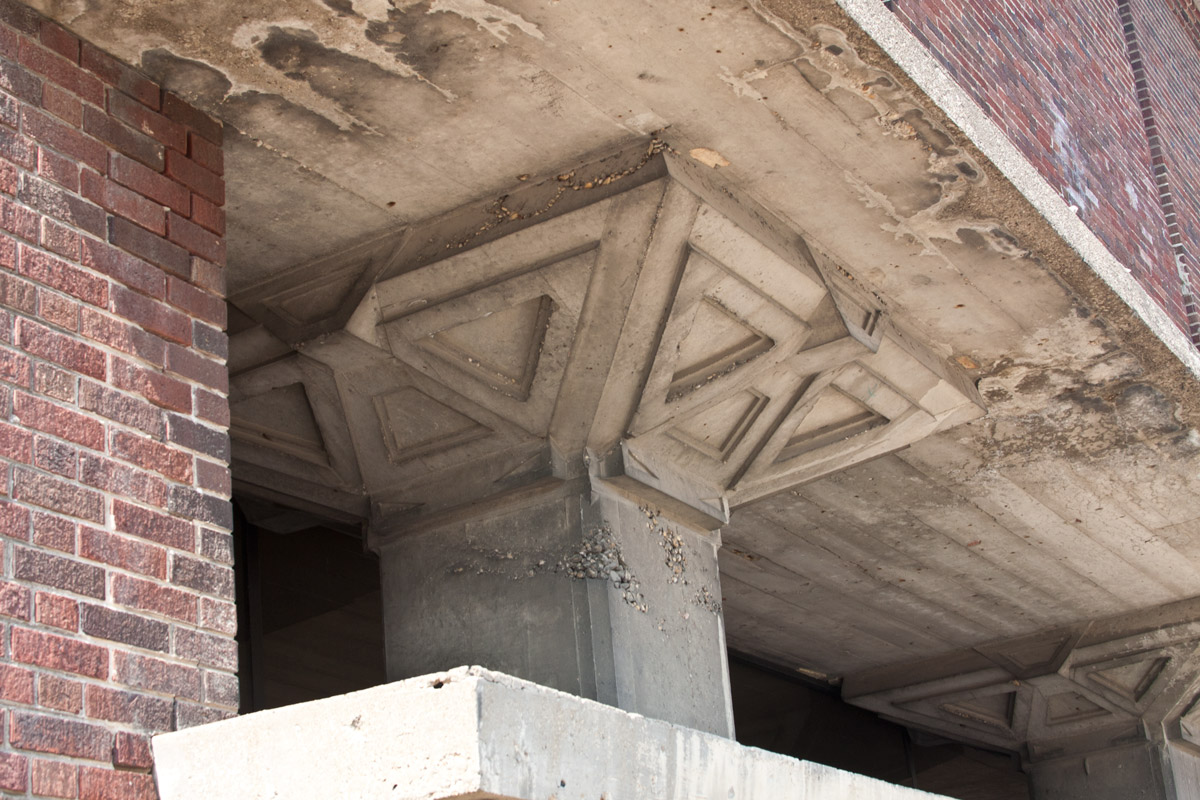
Column detail

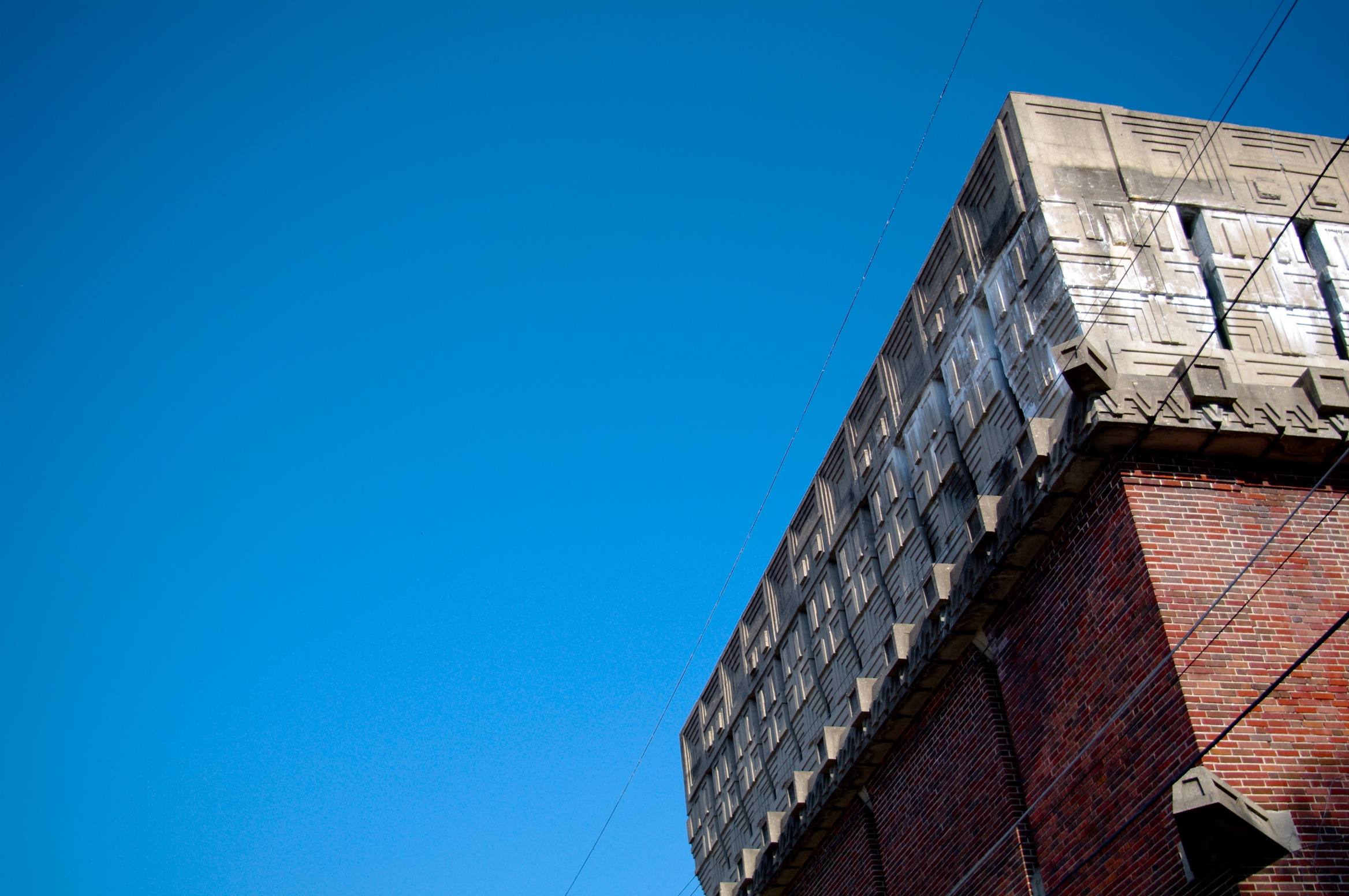
Roof Detail

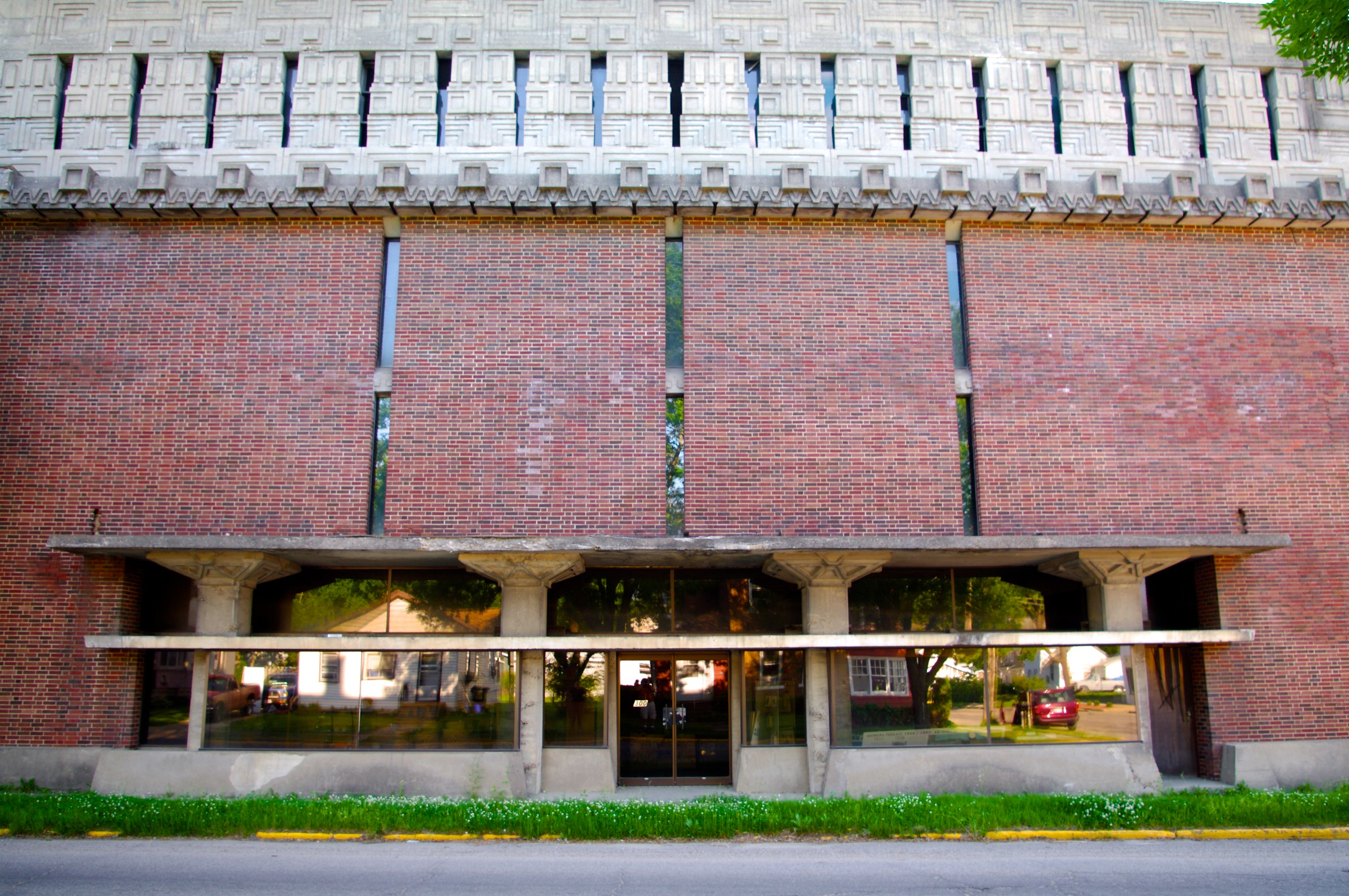
Front

== See also ==
- List of Frank Lloyd Wright works
- National Register of Historic Places listings in Richland County, Wisconsin
