= Louise C. Bentz House =

Historic house in Pasadena, California

- U.S. National Register of Historic Places
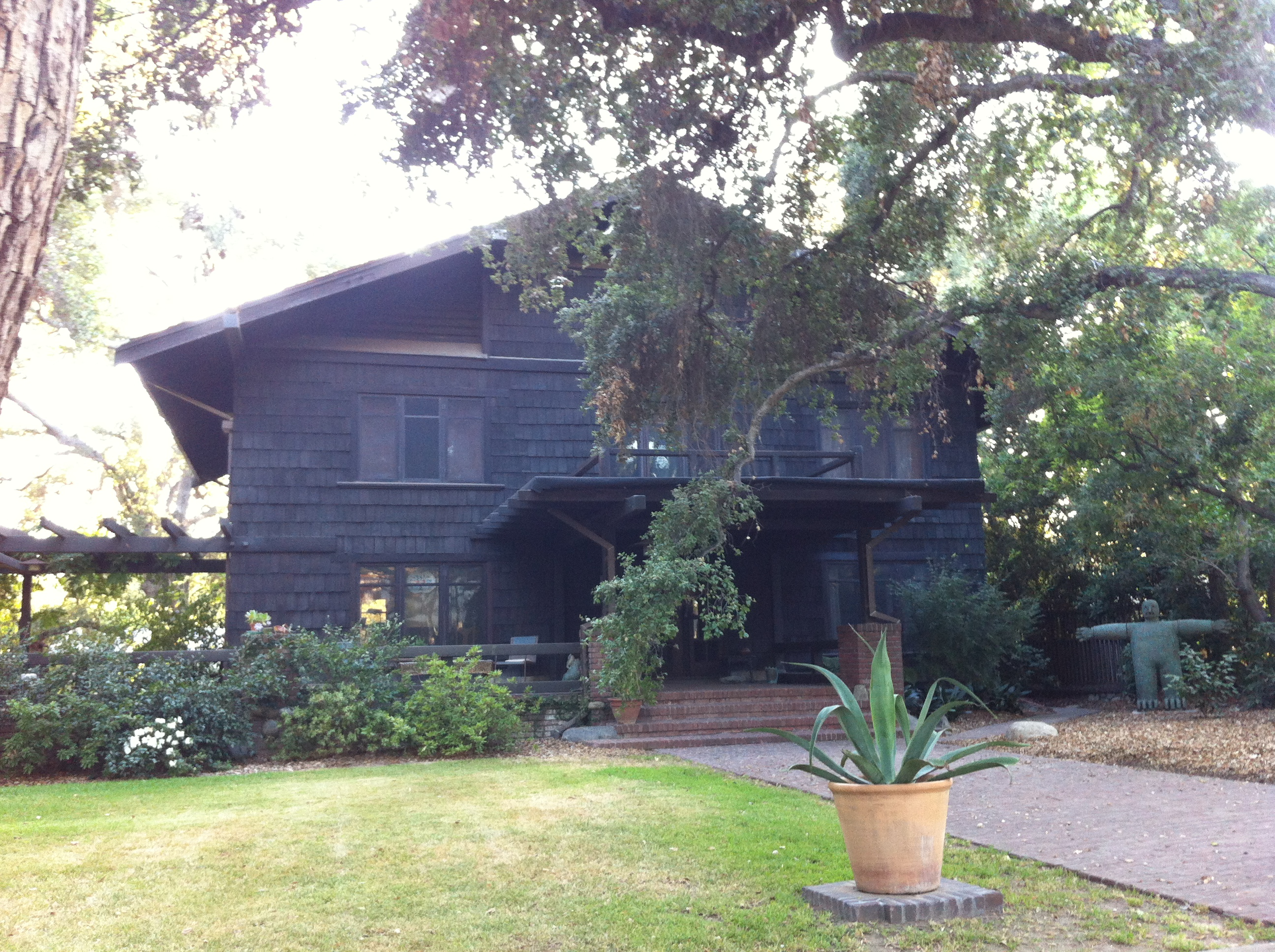

- Location within the Los Angeles metropolitan area Location within California Location within the United States
- Location: 657 Prospect Blvd., Pasadena, California
- Coordinates: 34°9′21″N 118°9′38″W
- Area: 0.4 acres (0.16 ha)
- Built: 1906
- Architect: Greene, Charles; Greene, Henry
- Architectural style: Bungalow
- NRHP reference No.: 77000299
- Added to NRHP: December 2, 1977

The Louise C. Bentz House is a historic house located at 657 Prospect Boulevard in Pasadena, California. Built in 1906, the bungalow was designed by prominent Pasadena architects Charles and Henry Greene. While the house has a typical bungalow design, its design also exhibits chalet influences in its overhangs and pitched roof and Japanese influences in the edges of the roof and overall horizontal emphasis. The house is the best remaining example of the houses the Greene brothers designed for middle-class Pasadena residents, most of which have been demolished or significantly altered. In addition, the house was the first built in the Prospect Park Tract, a neighborhood of historic homes designed by prominent architects. John Bentz, a significant Pasadena businessman and developer, commissioned the house.

The house was added to the National Register of Historic Places on December 2, 1977.

== See also ==
- National Register of Historic Places listings in Pasadena, California
