= Hanami (disambiguation) =

Hanami is the Japanese traditional custom of enjoying the transient beauty of flowers.

Hanami may also refer to:

== People with the given name ==
- Hanami Saito (齋藤 はなみ; born 2004), Japanese field hockey player
- Hanami Sekine (関根 花観; born 1996), Japanese female long-distance runner
- Hanami (surname)

== Film and television ==
- Hanami (film) is a drama film, directed by Denise Fernandes

== Music ==
- "Hanami" (song)

== Places ==
- Hanami (convention) is an annual anime convention in Koblenz
- Hanami River is a river in Yachiyo and Chiba
- Hanami Station was a railway station located in Noto

== Other uses ==
- Hanami Planum, a plateau on the dwarf planet Ceres
- Hanami, A minor antagonist in anime and manga series Jujutsu Kaisen

== See also ==
- Hanamichi
