= Edmund Teske =

American photographer (1911–1996)

- Born: March 7, 1911; Chicago, Illinois
- Died: November 22, 1996 (aged 85); Los Angeles, California
- Known for: Photography

Edmund Rudolph Teske (March 7, 1911 – November 22, 1996) was a 20th-century American photographer who combined a career of taking portraits of artists, musicians and entertainers with a prolific output of experimental photography. His use of techniques like: combined prints, montages and solarizations led to "often romantic and mysterious images". Although he exhibited extensively and was well known within artistic photography circles during his lifetime, his work was not widely known by the public. He has been called "one of the forgotten greats of American photography."

== Biography ==
Teske was born in Chicago, the eldest of three children born to Rudolph and Olga Teske. His parents were from Poland. When he was 8 years old his family moved to Wisconsin Rapids, Wisconsin, where they took up farming. During this period Teske developed his first artistic interests by experimenting with painting and poetry.

In 1921 his family moved back to Chicago, and Teske began to study music, primarily the piano and saxophone. Two years later his grammar school teacher, Mabel Morehouse, introduced him to photography and let him develop his own photos in the school darkroom. For the next decade he spent most of his free time practicing both the piano and photography, and by 1932 he was accomplished enough in the piano that he became the protégé of concert pianist Ida Lustgarten. At the same time his photographic skills had advanced to the point that he was given his first one-man exhibition at the Blackstone Theatre in Chicago.

The following year he began to pursue photography as a career and worked full-time at a Chicago studio called Photography Inc. In 1936 he traveled to New York to meet with Alfred Stieglitz, who encouraged and inspired him. That same year he met Frank Lloyd Wright at his Taliesin studio in Wisconsin. At Wright's invitation Teske created a photographic workshop within Taliesin to artistically document Wright's many architectural projects and to explore new relationships between architecture and photography. During Teske's many visits to Taliesin, Wright and other artists and musicians who stayed there helped Teske form his ideas about the role of artists in society and the importance of imparting social messages in his work.

The professional relationship with Wright greatly enhanced Teske's reputation, and over the next five years Teske met and sometimes worked with some of the greatest photographers of the time, including Ansel Adams, Paul Strand, László Moholy-Nagy and Berenice Abbott. He taught briefly with Moholy-Nagy at the New Bauhaus in Chicago, and in 1939 he worked as an assistant in Abbott's studio in New York. During this period he also started work on a sequence of photographs he called Portrait of My City, in which he documented scenes of Chicago with a particular focus on the social issues of the time. He also was introduced to the photographs of Man Ray, which inspired him to create his own images containing positive and negative elements.

When World War II broke out, Teske was drafted for military duty, but he failed his medical exam for "asocial tendencies, psychoneurosis and emotional instability." These were thought to have been medical code words to indicate his growing sexual interests in other men. As an alternative to military service Teske was appointed by the War Department to work as an assistant photographer for the U.S. Army Corps of Engineers at the Rock Island Arsenal in Illinois, where he printed aerial maps for military use. During this time he photographed two of his male co-workers nude while expressing his inner challenges in his journal:

Strive to accept the facts of life with courage and serenity to develop talent, as an outlet for emotion, and to find happiness in the world of the mind and spirit. In the days when Greece and Rome ruled the world in arts and letters and philosophy, love of man for man reached openly its pinnacle of beauty. Civilization today, moving forward, must eventually recognize these true facts of love and sex variations.

In early 1943 Teske was able to leave his position at Rock Island, and compelled by the thought of a new way of life and the rising romantic allure of Hollywood, he decided to move to Los Angeles. He stopped briefly at Wright's Taliesin West in Arizona to photograph the architect's vision there, finally arriving in Los Angeles in April. He started working in the photographic still department at Paramount Pictures, and he quickly inserted himself into the growing artistic and bohemian movement in the city. By coincidence he met Aline Barnsdall, a wealthy client of Wright, and she invited him to live in part of a large and then unfinished project called Olive Hill that Wright had begun for Barnsdall but had never finished due to differences of opinion about the design and the cost. She intended him to be caretaker for the property, but with her indulgence he soon assumed a much larger role. Teske started hosting informal parties and artistic gatherings in the rambling spaces of his new home. He grew a beard and "took on the trappings of a bohemian lifestyle.". Because of the expansive surroundings of Olive Hill and Teske's newly uninhibited lifestyle, his parties became a magnet for the creative minds of Hollywood and Los Angeles, including Man Ray, Anaïs Nin, George Cukor, Frances Dee, Joel McCrea, Tony Smith and John Whitney.

During this time Teske met Christopher Isherwood, who introduced him to the Hindu philosophy of Vedanta. Teske soon embraced the philosophy, in part because its teachings provided a grounding for how he already viewed life and in part because Isherwood and his friends were already part of the growing gay community in the city. Teske was fascinated with the Vedanta ideas that all aspects of life and nature are connected and that time exists only as it relates to other moments in a large universe.

He began to experiment with the concept that a regular photographic image could not define a moment in life, and that only multiple images portrayed together could convey what he called "universal essences." Throughout the rest of his life he continued to produce composite prints made by sandwiching two or more negatives together. Many of these images are now his signature photographs. During this time he also experimented with a variety of other photographic techniques, including solarization and collages.

In 1949 Teske left Olive Hill and moved to a small studio in Laurel Canyon, Los Angeles. He launched into a series of creative photographic experiments in which he both manipulated and combined multiple images to create "new pictorial realities". In one of these series, which he called "Shiva-Shakti", he printed an image of a nude male relaxing on his back with his penis fully exposed and, in separate photographs, overlaid this image with others that included landscapes, rooms, human faces, or completely abstract subjects. Although Teske had photographed nude men throughout his life, this series, with the repeated image of the reclining man, reintroduced "the sensuality of male imagery in his work" in the context of his exploration of Vedantic philosophy.

As Teske continued to contemplate the complex teachings of Vedanta, his delved further into using his photography to translate his feelings into imagery. Throughout the 1950s he experimented with new chemical and manipulative techniques, culminating in 1958 when he perfected a combination of photographic print toning and solarization. Edward Steichen coined the term "duotone solarization" to describe this new technique.

In 1959 the Museum of Modern Art purchased nine of his prints, further escalating his fame within the photographic world. The 1960s and '70s were the busiest time in his career. During this period he was given at least eighteen one-man exhibitions and took part in more than two dozen other group exhibitions. He met and sometimes taught with many of the important photographers of the time, including Aaron Siskind, Harry Callahan, Wynn Bullock, Jack Welpott, and Judy Dater. During this period he also befriended Jim Morrison, lead singer of The Doors, and took a series of informal portraits of Morrison and his girlfriend Pamela Courson.

During the last twenty years of his life Teske both worked and lived in his studio in East Hollywood, where he regularly taught workshops and mentored both younger and older photographers who sought his knowledge about art and philosophy. When he was asked by a reporter if he had any advice to give to new photographers, Teske replied, "Yes. Meditate!"

Around 1990 Teske embarked on assembling a comprehensive autobiographical collection of his work. Within a short time he had created a six-volume maquette he called ‘’Emanations," which he hoped would not only show his work as he wanted it to be seen but also tell the story of his life. He never found a publisher for the work.

The 1994 Northridge earthquake severely damaged Teske's studio, and he was forced to move out. He was living by himself in downtown Los Angeles when he died in his bed on November 22, 1996.

In his obituary in the Los Angeles Times, photographic historian Weston Naef wrote that Teske will "enter the history books as the grand master of a style of picture that is taken for granted now that computers have created ways to cut and paste images seamlessly."

Teske was given a posthumous retrospective at the J. Paul Getty Museum in 2004.
