= Clement Hanami =

Japanese-American artist

Clement Hanami is a Japanese-American artist. He grew up in the predominantly Latino California suburb of East Los Angeles, just outside of downtown. His mother was a hibakusha, or atomic bomb survivor. His father was a World War II incarceree.

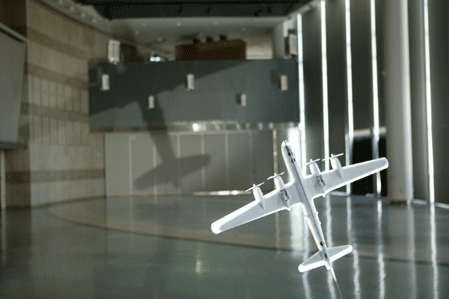
Clement Hanami's Fatman/LittleBoy.

He received his M.F.A. from the University of California Los Angeles in Studio Art with a specialization in New Genres. At UCLA, his mentor was Paul McCarthy and he worked alongside artists like Jason Rhoades, Robert Billings, Steve Hurd, and Martin Kersels. His work has been exhibited in California and New York and has been seen at The Geffen Contemporary at the Museum of Contemporary Art, Craft and Folk Art Museum, Los Angeles Municipal Art Gallery, Armory Center for the Arts, John Anson Ford Amphitheatre, California Museum of Photography, Long Beach Museum of Art, AFI National Video Festival, Santa Monica Museum of Art, KCET Independent Eye, Westwind Magazine, and Show-Mag Gallery.

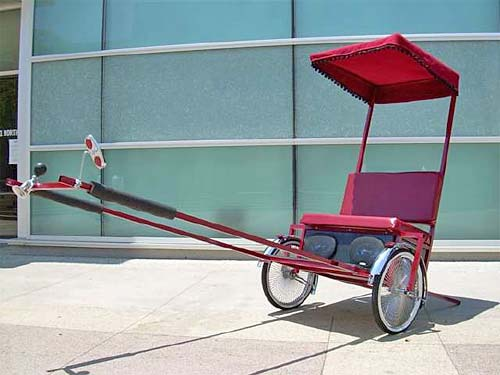
Clement Hanami's low rider rickshaw, "Rice Rocket."

Hanami is currently the Vice President of Exhibitions and Art Director at the Japanese American National Museum and primarily responsible for the design, installation, fabrication and maintenance of the museum's major exhibits. He co-managed the collaborative Arts partnership project Finding Family Stories and co-designed the exhibit Common Ground: The Heart of Community with ADOBE LA. He also served as Program Director for the National Center for the Preservation of Democracy. His most recent projects include curating the exhibitions "Instructions to All Persons: Reflections on Executive Order 9066" and "Transpacific Borderlands: The Art of Japanese Diaspora in Lima, Los Angeles, Mexico City, and São Paulo". He taught New Genres at the Los Angeles County High School for the Arts for 20 years. He was a Cultural Affairs Commissioner for the City of Culver City from 2004 to 2010. He received a Getty Visual Arts Fellowship in 2000 and a COLA Artist Award in 2007 given by the Department of Cultural Affairs, City of Los Angeles.

In 2006 he participated in "Tigers and Jaguars: L.A.'s Asian-Latino Art Phenomenon" at the Craft and Folk Art Museum, Los Angeles.

In 2010 he completed "Through the Looking Glass" or "Traveling at the Speed of Light (Rail)" as part of the Metro Goldline's East Side Extension. This artwork is located at the East LA Civic Center station in East Los Angeles. In 2013 he participated in a virtual exhibition entitled Art Intersections, a Smithsonian Asian-Latino pop-up museum by the Smithsonian Asian Pacific American Center. In 2015 he participated in an art project at the Museum of Man at Balboa Park in San Diego. Using an object from the museums vast collection, he created the large scale installation "The Allegory of Moby Dick" or "The Oceanic Feeling of Whiteness" that was displayed in the museum's main hall.

On May 28 and 29 of 2016, his Rice Rocket was part of the ground breaking Smithsonian Asian Pacific American Center exhibition "Crosslines: A Culture Lab on Intersectionality" at the Arts and Industries Building in Washington D.C. In 2017 he completed the artwork "Moving Day", a time-based art installation that projected digital versions of the WWII Exclusion Orders that authorized the incarceration of Japanese Americans onto JANM's Historic Building.
