= Los Angeles Municipal Art Gallery =

American museum in Barnsdall Art Park

Coordinates: 34.100425°N 118.293851°W

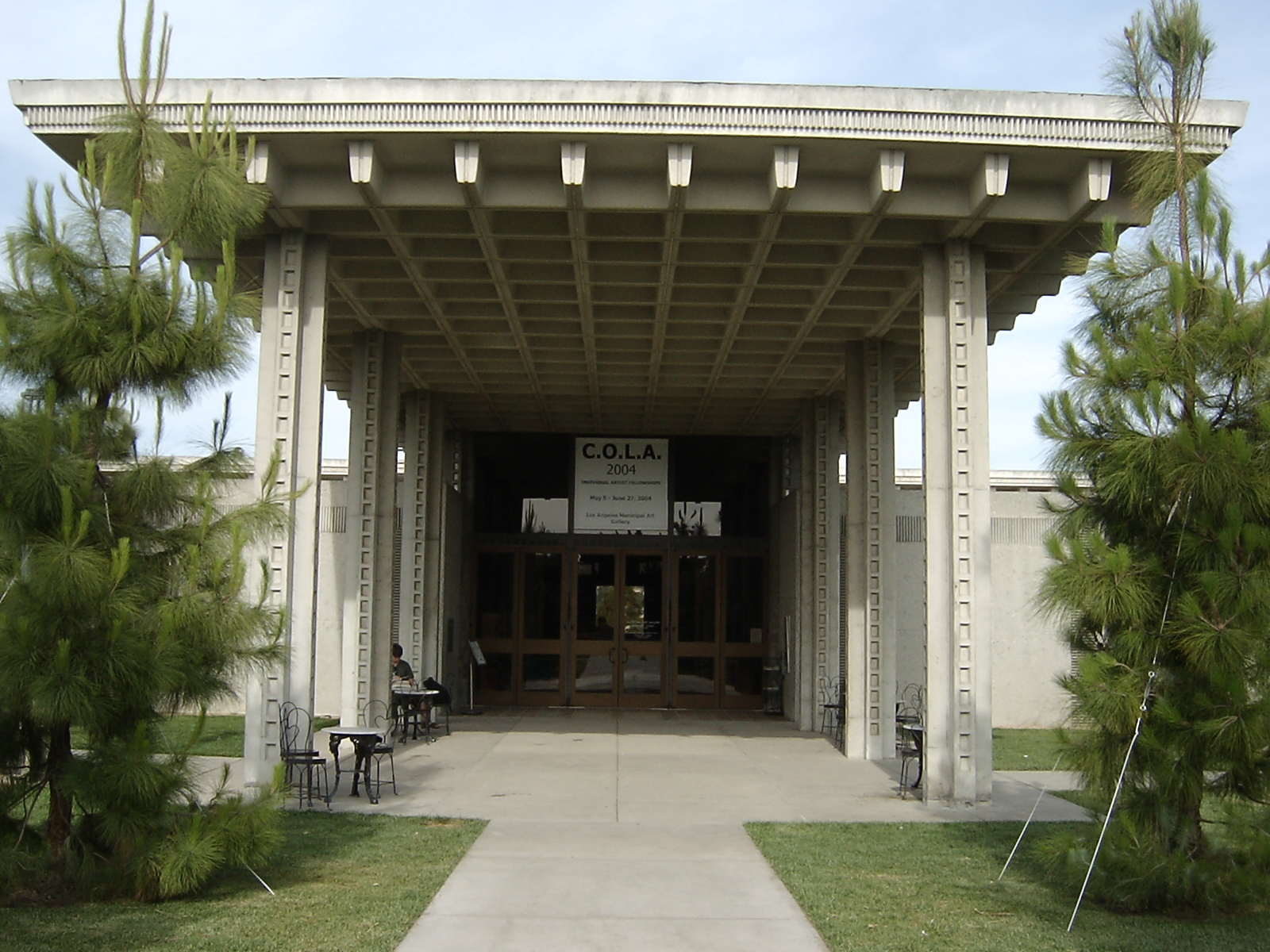
Entrance to the Los Angeles Municipal Art Gallery, in Barnsdall Art Park.

The Los Angeles Municipal Art Gallery is located in the Barnsdall Art Park in Los Angeles, California. It focuses on the arts and artists of Southern California. The gallery was first established in 1954.

== Main building ==
The Los Angeles Municipal Art Gallery (LAMAG) is a 10,000-square-foot (930 m^{2}) venue that offers exhibition space for large, thematic group exhibitions that are representative of the current endeavors of area artists, and major retrospective exhibitions of work by individuals who have made an extraordinary contribution and impact on art in Los Angeles. The Junior Arts Center Gallery is a 2,000-square-foot (190 m^{2}) venue that offers a more intimate space for one person exhibitions by mid-career artists who have produced a significant body of high-quality work, as well as smaller thematic group shows. At times the two spaces are linked by a single, large-scale exhibition occupying both galleries.

LAMAG is dedicated to the presentation, interpretation, documentation, promotion, and enrichment of the arts and artists of the culturally diverse Southern California. As the city's primary exhibition venue, the gallery is devoted to the exhibiting emerging, mid-career, and senior artists from the area, in group and individual presentation formats. The curatorial focus includes painting, sculpture, photography, architecture, video, installation, design, and related disciplines that reflect the architectural fabric of Los Angeles.

The ongoing mission is to provide college level studio arts which are taught by artist/instructors who are professional artists. The Senior Living Arts program provides arts experience for adults with special needs, in retirement center, schools and special facilities. The center has developed a sense of community and has a student body from the ages of 18 well into their 80s.

== Programming ==
=== Exhibitions program ===
The exhibitions program at Barnsdall Park produces approximately nine exhibitions of contemporary art each year at the Municipal Art Gallery. The mission of the program is to promote, interpret and present to the general public, the contemporary art of artists from culturally diverse Southern California. The curatorial focus includes painting, sculpture, photography, architecture, design, video, electronic, performance and installation works. Exhibits at Barnsdall Park serve over 45,000 visitors annually.

Exhibitions at the gallery are developed and produced by the curatorial staff, who often work with guest curators to insure a diversified curatorial perspective. The curators work with advisory input from the gallery's Artist Advisory Committee and the Los Angeles Municipal Art Gallery Associates Program Committee. These committees each meet six times a year with the curatorial staff to discuss issues, evaluate current exhibitions, and preview the development of future exhibitions. While the Gallery Associates raises funds to support the Exhibition and Education Programs at the gallery, the Associates Program Committee also seeks to develop and produce ancillary programs such as films, lectures and symposia. Gallery hours are Wednesday through Friday from 11:00 a.m. to 4:00 p.m. (closed during installation and for all official City holidays). A wheelchair for visitor use within the facility is available. Please ask the gallery attendant at the entrance for assistance. Sign Language Interpreters are available with at least two weeks advance notice.

=== Teacher programs ===
The Teacher Resource Center is a collection of art education materials available to the public throughout the year. Teachers are welcome to visit the center, conduct research, and borrow from resources that include: a selection of art education and art history books and packets, a slide library containing hundreds of images from historical as well as contemporary art periods, and a collection of mounted small poster prints for use in a range of classroom activities.

=== Public and family programming ===
Conversations With The Artists is a way to learn more about the art on exhibition through informal talks with the artists themselves. The Children's Film Series is a film and art workshop offered in the late fall and spring.

Self-guided tours for families of art in Barnsdall Park. The Barnsdall Art Park Family Tour is an interactive walking tour that gives family members an opportunity to see the architecture and public works of art in the Park. A specially prepared activity booklet is made available to the public free of charge containing information about the works of art, interesting discussion topics for all ages about each work, and art activities based on the artwork.

== Slide registry ==
The City of Los Angeles Department of Cultural Affairs maintained a Slide Registry which includes slides and artist information of over 1300 artists in California. The Registry was an important resource for curators, art consultants, gallery owners, film studios, developers, and libraries In addition to slide and artist files, information on each artist is also contained in a computer database. There used to be a $20 fee for artists who wish to be registered, but the advent of the digital age and the trend of artists maintaining their own personal websites to display work has led to the decision to shut down the registry in recent years.

The education program was designed to help familiarize the public with the rich diversity of contemporary art, particularly the achievements of living Southern California artists that form the core of the Municipal Art Gallery's exhibitions. The Education Department of the Municipal Art Gallery seeks to familiarize the public with the rich diversity of contemporary art, particularly the achievements of living Southern California artists which form the core of the gallery's exhibitions through innovative and participatory programs. The educational programs of Hollyhock House aim to increase public awareness of the history of the house, the architecture of Frank Lloyd Wright, and the ideas and contributions of Aline Barnsdall; to encourage an understanding of the need to preserve historic sites, and to promote an appreciation of Los Angeles history.

Through informal study and discussion, gallery visitors of all ages and backgrounds may better understand and enjoy a challenging range of art in a broad variety of media and styles. With facilitation by the gallery educator, each exhibition becomes an opportunity for the public to explore new perceptions, gather information, and develop fresh insights into the contemporary art world as well as the world around them.

== Tours ==
The Education division offers tours of LAMAG exhibitions to groups of all ages, from kindergarten to seniors. Tours are led by gallery educators trained in participatory tour techniques that encourage viewers to analyze and refine their appreciation of contemporary art. For student tours, the educators use interactive inquiry methods, role-play, theater techniques and guided art projects to promote enjoyment and understanding.

=== Outreach programs ===
The school outreach program introduces aspects of exhibitions to groups before the date of the class visit to the Municipal Art Gallery. Outreach educators travel to classrooms, show slides of selected artworks, and conduct hands-on projects to further prepare students for their gallery visit.

== Internships ==
In the college and graduate school Internship Program, majors in art, art history or education are trained as gallery educators. They teach in the gallery for a two-hour period on selected mornings, attend weekly training meetings, and keep journals to document their progress. Through direct experience, interns can learn about contemporary art as well as how to engage young people and adults in dialogues on various art issues. College and Graduate School Internships are available throughout the academic year, offering academic credit.

=== Multicultural Internships ===
Multicultural internships are offered by the Education division. They have been designed to prepare students from underserved groups for future employment in the arts through apprenticeships in the Education division. The interns not only gain valuable professional experience but are able to conduct tours.

In the Multicultural Internship program, individuals from universities, colleges, and community arts organizations who have an interest in art and education are trained as gallery educators. Interns receive museum training, attend education classes, and experience an introduction to various aspects of curatorial work for exhibitions.
