= Hanami (surname) =

Hanami is a surname. Notable people with the surname include:

- Clement Hanami, Japanese-American artist
- Ren Hanami, American actress, writer, director and singer
