= Hanami (convention) =

Anime convention in Koblenz, Germany

The Hanami is an annual anime convention in Koblenz based on the Japanese Hanami. It is organized by the Animexx.

Since 2024, it has been held in the Rhein-Mosel-Halle in Koblenz.

Hanami 2020 (scheduled for May 9-10) has been canceled due to the COVID-19 pandemic. Instead, an online event took place from April 13 to 14.
