= Aline Barnsdall =

American oil heiress (1882–1946)

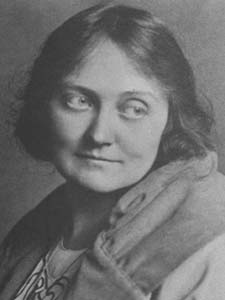
- Portrait of Barnsdall, circa 1916
- Born: Louise Aline Barnsdall; April 1, 1882; Bradford, Pennsylvania
- Died: December 18, 1946 (aged 64); Los Angeles, California

Louise Aline Barnsdall (April 1, 1882 – December 18, 1946) was an American oil heiress, best known as Frank Lloyd Wright's client for the Hollyhock House in Los Angeles, now the centerpiece of the city's Barnsdall Art Park.

== Biography ==
Born in Bradford, Pennsylvania, Barnsdall was the daughter of oilman Theodore Newton Barnsdall. T.N. Barnsdall and his father, Aline's grandfather, had been early participants in the Pennsylvanian oil rush of the late 1850s. From humble beginnings the family amassed a fortune estimated at $15,000,000, with large land holdings in Oklahoma and California.

As a young woman Barnsdall toured Europe with her father, developing an interest in feminism and radical causes. By 1913 she was producing experimental theater in Chicago. She is mentioned in Emma Goldman's autobiography Living My Life as a close friend who wrote out a $5000 check to ease Goldman's deportation to Russia.

In February 1917, her father died, leaving her half of the assets of the Barnsdall Oil Company. By some accounts she received $3 million. On August 19, 1917, she became an unmarried mother by design, a scandalous choice for the time. Her daughter was born in Seattle, took her mother's surname, and was known as "Sugartop". Also in 1917 she produced a season of Los Angeles Little Theater, engaging a young Norman Bel Geddes as set designer.

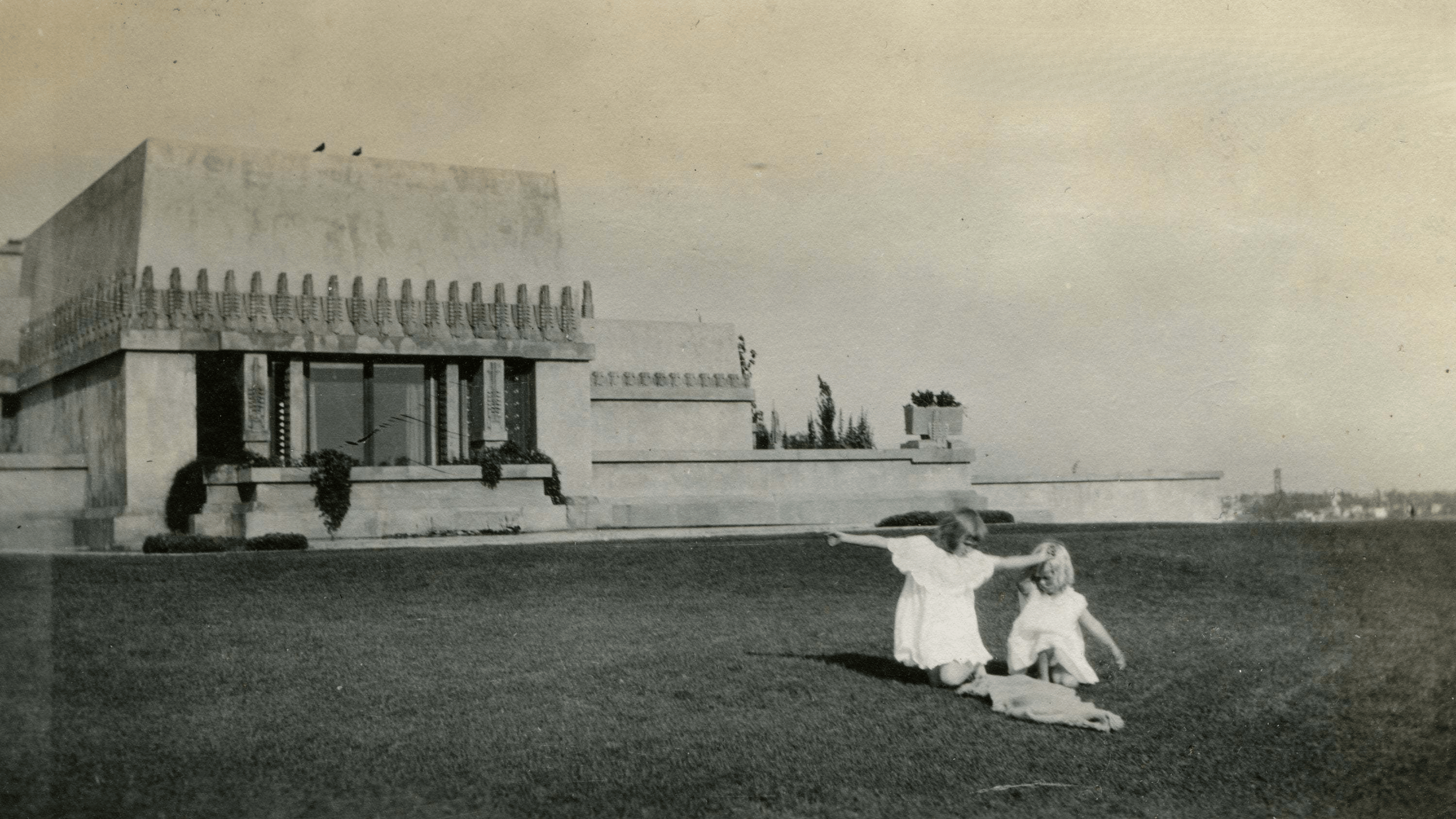
Betty Barnsdall in front of the Hollyhock House, c. 1922

She hired Frank Lloyd Wright to design a home for her and a vaguely defined "progressive theatrical community". This commission ultimately became the landmark Hollyhock House. Barnsdall bought the local 35-acre (140,000 m^{2}) Olive Hill property in 1919. Construction began in 1919 continuing until she fired Wright in 1921. Almost immediately, she began plans to give it away. Extensive correspondence between Barnsdall and Wright in these years shows a close, sympathetic relationship. Finally, though, she grew very unhappy with the house's impracticalities and staggering cost overruns.

Another longstanding feature of Olive Hill was Barnsdall's news-billboards meant to educate Angeleans about the Thomas Mooney case, the candidacy of Upton Sinclair for Governor of California, and her other causes. She was a guiding force and important financial contributor for the Hollywood Bowl, and a patron of architects Richard Neutra, Rudolph Schindler, and photographer Edmund Teske among others. Through the 1930s and 1940s, she continued to live on Olive Hill. She died in 1946.
