= Josef Dobrowsky =

Austrian painter (1889–1964)

Josef Dobrowsky (22 September 1889 - 9 January 1964) was an Austrian painter and member of the Zinkerbacher Artist Colony that lived and worked together at Lake Wolfgang until its dissolution after Austria was annexed by Germany, known as the Anschluss, in 1938.

== Early life ==
Josef Dobrowsky was born in Carlsbad, Bohemia, part of the Austrian Empire at the time under the Hapsburg monarchy. His father was a jeweler.

As a teenager Dobrowsky attended the Vienna School of Applied Arts, Franz Hohenberger's painting school until 1906 when he began studying at the Academy of Fine Arts in Vienna where he learned under Christian Griepenkerl and Rudolf Bacher. There he became friends with Ernst Huber. From 1914 to 1918 his studies were interrupted by the First World War and his military service. He returned to school after the war and graduated in 1919.

In 1915, Dobrowsky married Theresia Mayer (1889–1972). They had two sons together, Karl and Josef.

== Career ==
Following the war he worked as a freelance artist and became a member of the Vienna Secession and later the Prague Secession. His work was focused mostly on landscapes and portraits, but also some genre scenes.

Dobrowsky's early work is influenced by older contemporary Austrian painters like Gustav Klimt, Albin Egger-Lienz and Ferdinand Hodler. Starting in 1920 he began an intense study of the Old Masters of the Netherlands His later work is heavily influenced by them, especially Pieter Brueghel the Elder.

Beginning in 1927 Dobrowsky joined Ferdinand Kitt in summers to Lake Wolfgang and the small, adjacent town of Zinkerbach. Other notable artists who attended included Sergius Pauser, Franz von Zülow, Lisel Salzer, Ernst Huber, Georg Erhlich, Bettina Bauer-Ehrlich, Georg Merkel and Louise Merkel-Romee . The group became known as the Zinkerbach Artist Colony. They met and discussed and created art over the course of several summers between the mid 1920's and 1937. After Austria joined the German reich in 1937, known as the Anschluss, many of the artists were forced to flee because of their Jewish identity or their political leanings.

In 1936 Dobrowsky received the Great Austrian State Prize for Fine Art. He would win it again in 1962.

Dobrowsky stayed in Vienna throughout the war, continued painting and exhibiting although his art was taken down at times for degeneracy, such as in 1937 from the Great German Art Museum and in 1943 from the Vienna Portraits from Art and Science Circles in the Künstlerhaus. Dobrowsky joined the Künstlerhaus due to the Vienna Secession being forced to dissolve in 1939. The Vienna Secession was revived after the war in 1946 and he again became a member.

After the war Dobrowski was named a professor of painting at the Vienna Academy. Alfred Hrdlicka, Josef Mikl and Wolfgang Hollegha all studied under him.

Josef Dobrowsky died in Tullnerbach on January 9, 1964.
