= Elke Krystufek =

Austrian conceptual artist

Elke Silvia Krystufek
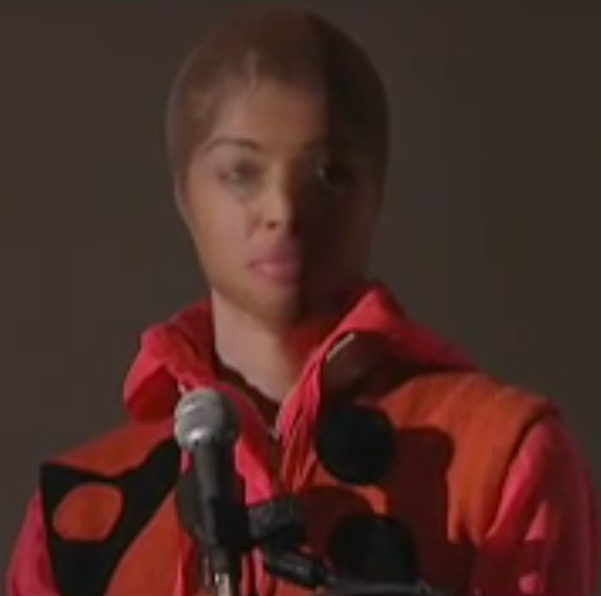
- At the Brooklyn Museum in 2007
- Born: 1970 (age 55–56); Austria
- Known for: Conceptual art

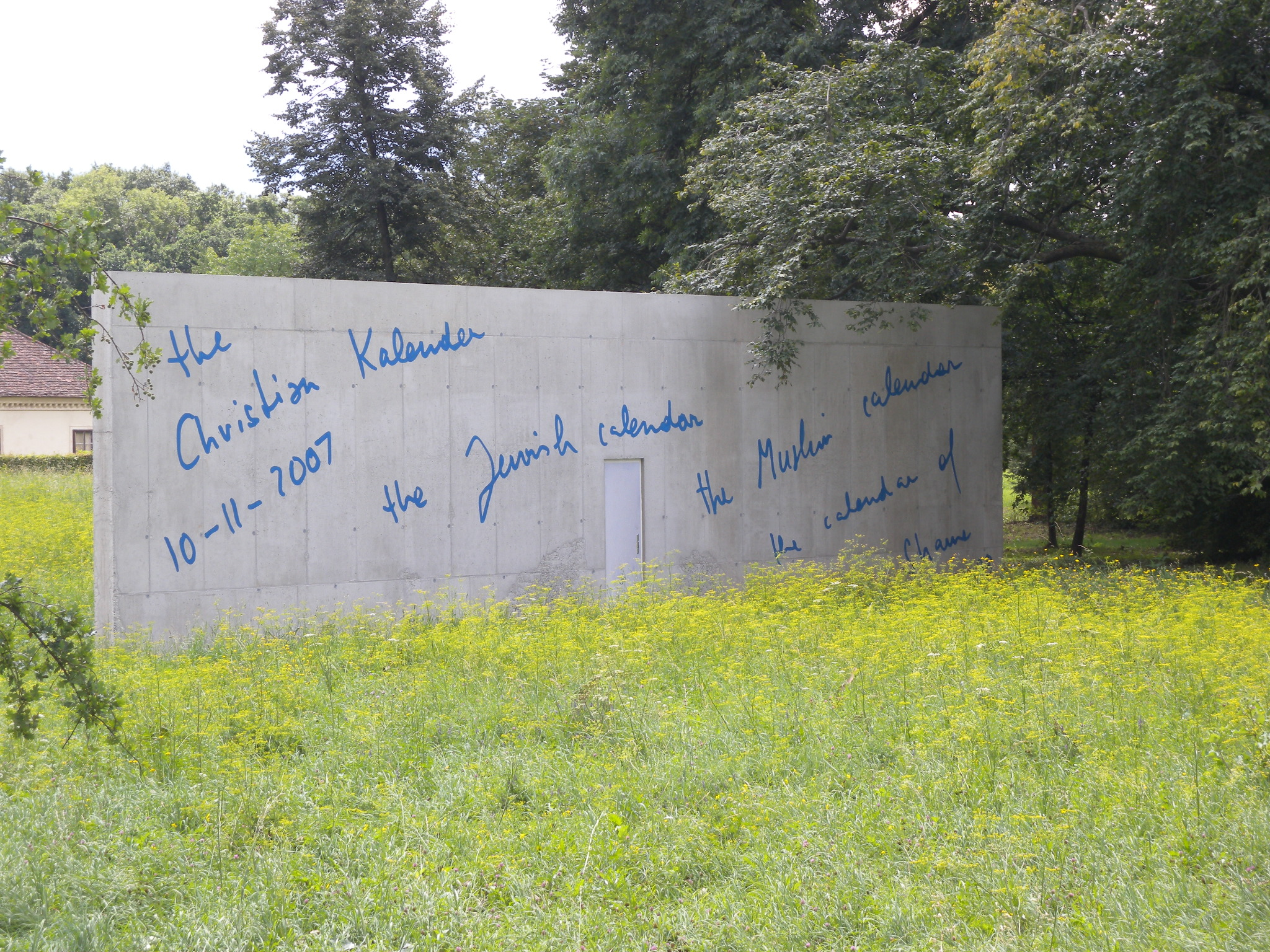
elke krystufek: Wall of Silence, Schlosspark Grafenegg

Elke Silvia Krystufek (born 1970) is an Austrian conceptual artist who lives and works in Berlin, Germany, and Vienna, Austria. She works in a variety of media including painting, sculpture, video and performance art.

== Life ==
Krystufek studied at the Academy of Fine Arts Vienna in the early 1990s. Her work is informed by a history of Austrian artists – from Egon Schiele to the Vienna Actionists and Valie Export – who have explicitly explored sexuality in art.

== Work ==
For her collection of images in the form of postcard-size photographs, titled “I am your mirror”, she took inspiration from the documentary work of photographer Nan Goldin and the “Atlas” by the German Painter Gerhard Richter. With the exhibition “Liquid Logic”, then direction of Peter Noever gave Krystufek access to all storages of the Museum of Applied Arts in Vienna and the MAK. She drew comparisons between a thematically arranged selection of objects from the museum collections that are rarely shown or on display.

In 2009, she represented Austria at the 53rd Biennale of Venice in the Austrian Pavilion along with Dorit Margreiter, Franziska and Lois Weinberger. In this show she dealt with the art-historical phenomenon of a nude male model painted by a heterosexual woman and the last film by Friedrich Wilhelm Murnau Tabu. Since her solo exhibition at Susanne Vielmetter Los Angeles Projects, the gallery gives access to part of the Elke Krystufek Archive on the subject of immigration. On 13 April 2011 her first theater play Hub premiered at the Garage X, Theater at Petersplatz in Vienna. On 27 May her first public outdoor sculpture titled The Wall of Silence in the Schlosspark Grafenegg was destroyed on desire of Tassilo Metternich-Sándor.
