= MAK Center for Art and Architecture =

Art museum in West Hollywood, California

Coordinates: 34°05′11″N 118°22′20″W

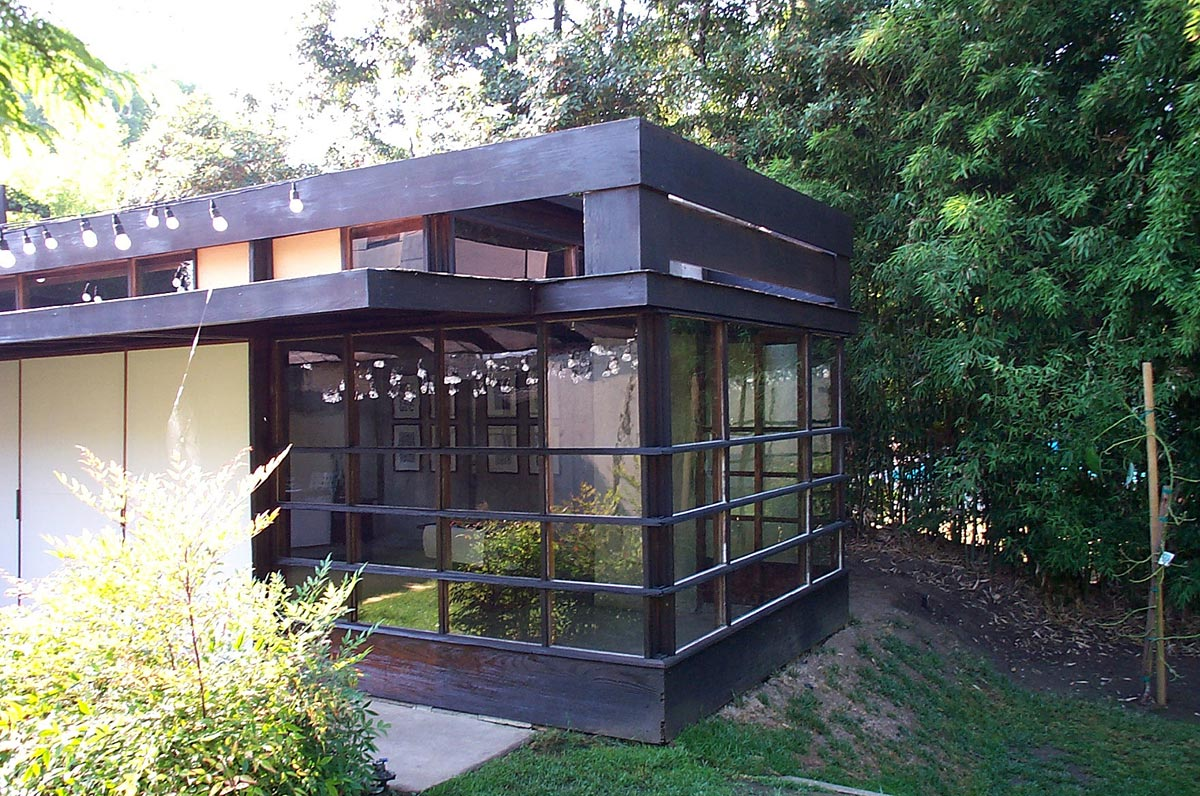
- The Schindler House, in which the museum is located
- Established: August 10, 1994
- Location: West Hollywood, California
- Type: Art and architectural center
- Website: https://www.makcenter.org/

The MAK Center for Art and Architecture is an art museum and cultural center headquartered in the Schindler House in West Hollywood, California, United States. It is affiliated with the Museum of Applied Arts, Vienna (MAK). The Center is situated in three architectural landmarks, designed by Austrian-American architect R.M. Schindler. The center operates a residency program, an exhibition space at the Mackey Apartments, and a study center at the Fitzpatrick-Leland House.

== History ==
The MAK Center for Art and Architecture was founded in 1994 by Peter Noever, Director of the MAK / Museum of Applied Arts, Vienna. On August 10, 1994, the Friends of the Schindler House formally entered into an agreement with the Austrian Museum of Applied Arts in Vienna to create the non-profit MAK Center for Art and Architecture.

== Sites ==
The MAK Center operates three works of architecture by Rudolph M. Schindler:

- The landmark Schindler House in West Hollywood.
- The Mackey Apartments in Mid-City Los Angeles.
- The Fitzpatrick-Leland House in the Hollywood Hills.

The Schindler House (1922) serves as the headquarters of the MAK Center for Art and Architecture, founded in 1994 as an independent satellite of the MAK-Austrian Museum of Applied Arts, Vienna, in cooperation with the Federal Chancellery of Austria/Art Division and the Friends of the Schindler House (FoSH).

The Mackey Apartments (1939) provide residential facilities for the MAK Center’s residency programs. The building was purchased by the Austrian government in 1995 and made available for the activities of the MAK Center. Funded by the Austrian Federal Ministry of Economic Affairs and Labor, restoration works began in 1995 by the Central Office of Architecture, and continued with architects Space International in 2001 and 2004.

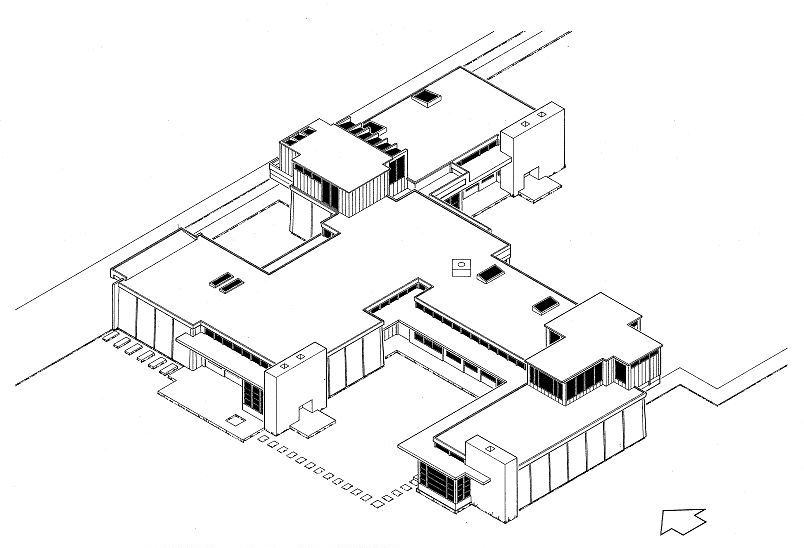
Schindler House Isometry

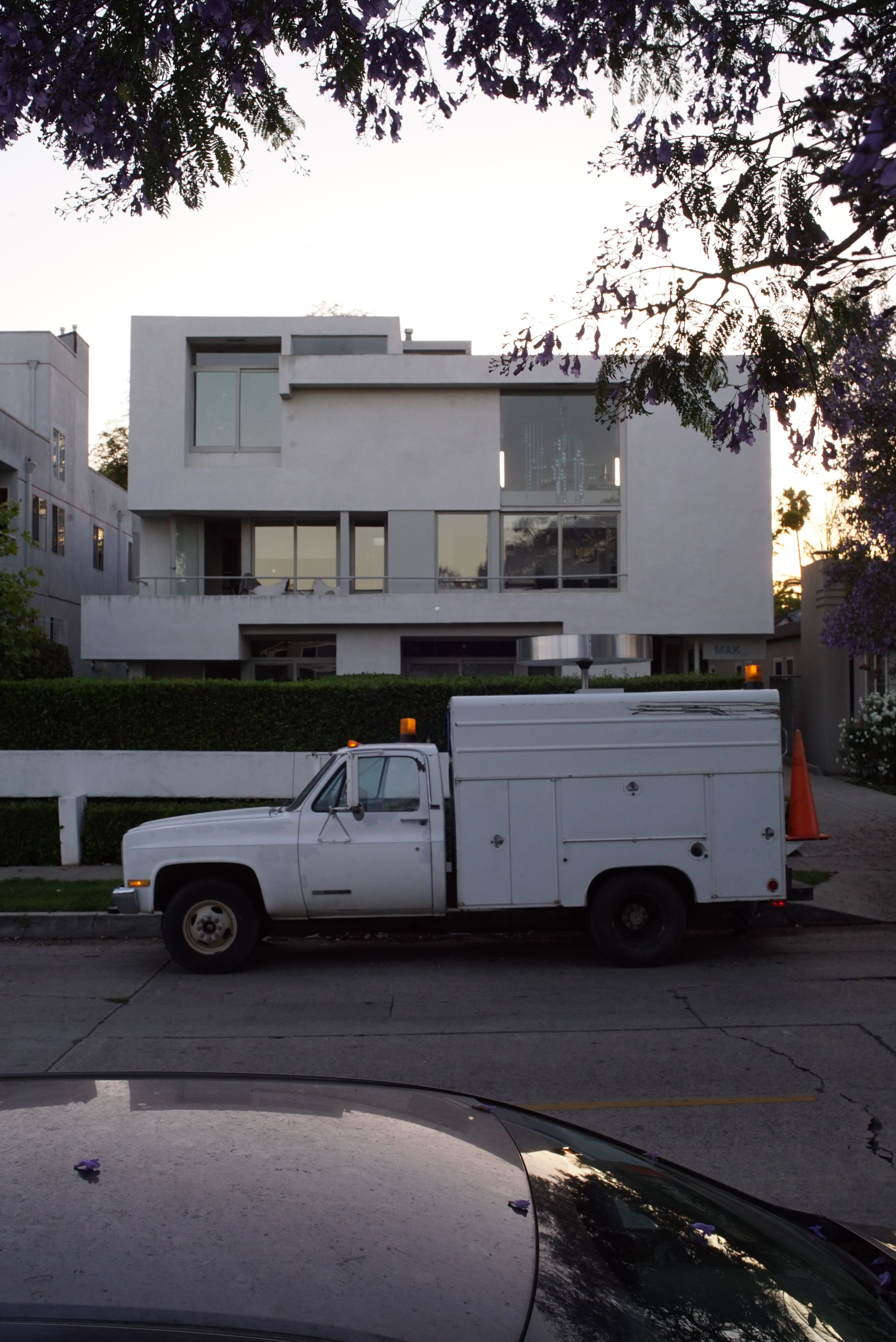
Mackey Apartment House. Originally Constructed in 1939.

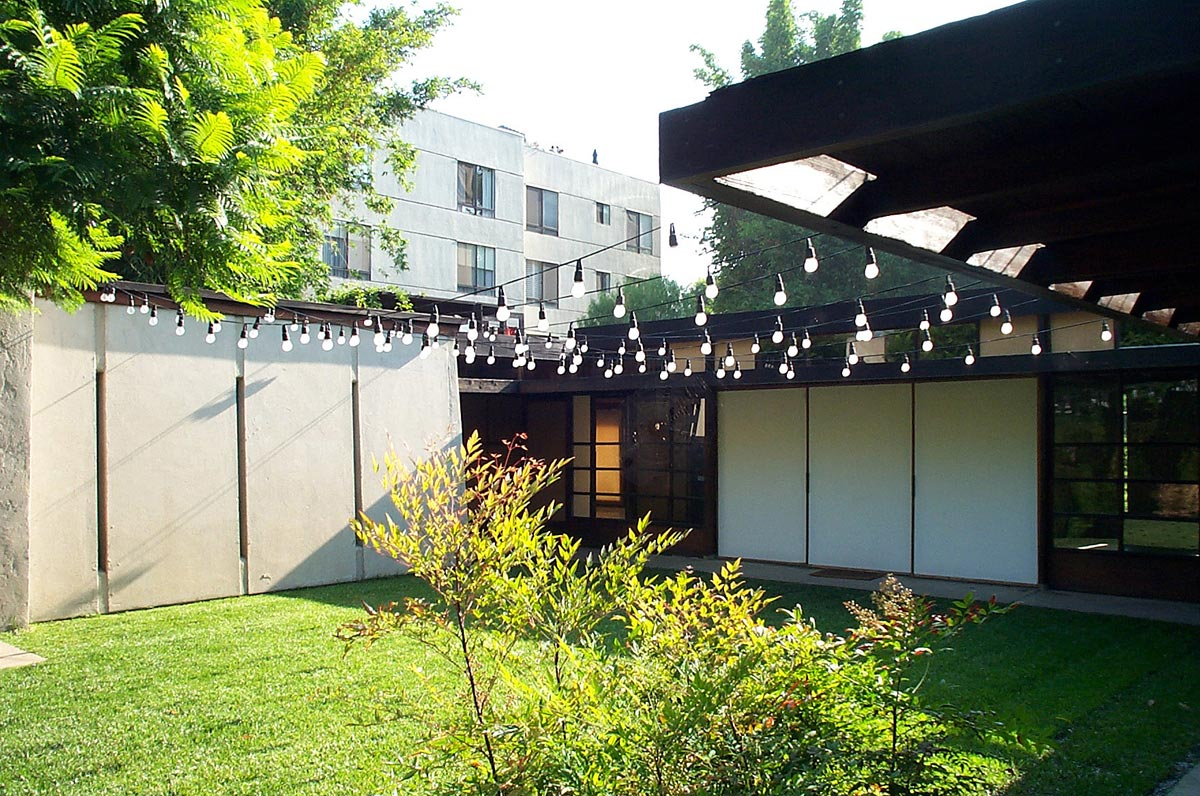
Schindler House. Originally Constructed in 1922.

== Exhibitions and programs ==
Major exhibitions in the Center’s history include

- Schindler Houses: 100 Years in the Making (2022), an exhibition celebrating the first century of the modernist house.
- AMEND (2020), an exhibition and series of four performances by multi-disciplinary artist Chris Emile that explores Black male identity through cinema, sculpture and sound.
- Soft Schindler (2019) showed the 'incompleteness' of binary ideas in architecture, sculpture, and design.
- How to Read El Pato Pascual: Disney's Latin America and Latin America's Disney (2017), curated by Jesse Lerner and Rubén Ortiz Torres, presented as part of Getty's Pacific Standard Time: LA/LA and considering questions of cultural appropriation and exchange through Disney characters.
- Routine Pleasures (2016), curated by Michael Ned Holte, promoted the idea of the “termite tendency” in art production via the work of sixteen Los Angeles-based producers.
- A Vast Furniture by visual and performance artist Carmen Argote. changed the terms in which to consider the Schindler House's location and history.
- Tony Greene: Room of Advances (2014) sustained a three-month public dialogue about art and activism in the LGBTQ community.
- Everything Loose Will Land (2013), curated by UCLA scholar Sylvia Lavin, explored the cross-pollination that took place between architects and artists in the region in the 1970s.

Additional past exhibitions include:

- Anarchitecture: Works by Gordon Matta-Clark (1997).
- Martin Kippenberger: The Last Stop West—METRO–Net Projects (1998).
- Architecture and Revolution: The Cuban National Art Schools (1999).
- Richard Prince: Up State (2000).
- Frederick J. Kiesler: Endless Space (2000–01).
- Gerald Zugmann, Blue Universe: Architectural Manifestos by COOP HIMMELB(L)AU (2002).
- Skip Arnold, 835 North Kings Road (2003).
- Contemporary Architects Face Schindler Today (2003).
- Yves Klein: Air Architecture (2004).
- Amir Zaki: Spring Through Winter (2005).
- Gunther Domenig: Structures that Fit My Nature (2005).
- Issac Julien: True North (2005).
- Symmetry (2006).
- Repeat: Brandon Lattu (2006).
- The Gen(H)ome Project (2006).
- Arnulf Rainer: Hypergraphics (2007).
- Victor Burgin: The Little House (2007).

=== Residency program ===
The MAK Center operates the international MAK Artists and Architects-in-Residence Program at the Mackey Apartments. A six-month residency is offered twice annually to two artists and two architects per cycle. Residents live and work at the Mackey Apartments and present projects in exhibitions at the end of their term in March and September. The program has been running since October 1995.

The MAK Center has hosted 200 individual residents of Los Angeles’ arts, artists and architects from Austria, Argentina, Brazil, India, Mexico, Peru, Russia, South Africa, South Korea, Taiwan, Thailand and Turkey, amongst others. The Center initiated a twice-yearly exhibition series, Garage Exchange, in 2012, which invites alumni residents to collaborate with Los Angeles artists and architects of their choosing.

== Leadership ==
In 2002, architect and curator Kimberli Meyer was named director. In 2016, Meyer announced her departure from MAK Center to helm the Cal State Long Beach Art Museum. From 2016–2020, Priscilla Fraser, then Project Architect at LACMA, joined the MAK Center. In 2021, Jia Yi Gu, former director at Materials & Applications, was appointed the museum's new director.
