= Lisel Salzer =

American painter (1906–2005)

Lisel Salzer (August 26, 1906 – December 6, 2005) was an Austrian-born painter of Jewish heritage who fled the Nazis during World War II and resettled in America, where she continued her art career until her death.

== Early life ==
Lisel Salzer was born in Austria. Her father was a German-speaking citizen of the Austria-Hungarian Empire, and her mother was born in Turkey. Both of her parents and Lisel were Jewish. Lisel was the only child of a well-to-do family. Her artistic talents were noticed early, and she attended the Vienna Art Academy. After she graduated in 1929 at the age of 23, her parents sent her to Paris for three months to continue her studies before she opened her own studio in Vienna not far from her parents' house. Her works were accepted into top-rated exhibitions and were shown at the Vienna Secession. Her paintings were also exhibited and sold at the Würthle Gallery, alongside the work of contemporary stars Gustav Klimt and Egon Schiele.

The Salzer family spent summers near Salzburg, by the Wolfgangsee, and there Salzer would meet and join the artist community of the Zinkenbach artist colony which included many famous Austrian artists of the time period, including Georg Ehrlich, Alfred Gerstenbrand, Ernst Huber, Ferdinand Kitt and others. In 1939, Salzer and other Jewish artists fled Austria under the threat of Nazi persecution. Lisel Salzer arrived in New York. Her parents died at the Theresiendstadt concentration camp in Czechoslovakia.

== New York career ==
In New York, Lisel Salzer continued her artistic career in the luxury shops at Bonwit Teller, painting oil and pastel portraits of the children of high-society women who frequented the store. She also painted watercolor landscapes, including many of Central Park.

When she arrived in New York she joined her boyfriend, Dr. Frederick Grossman, an Austrian physician and cellist who had fled before her and was waiting for her. They moved in to an apartment together in Manhattan and married in 1942.

In 1945, Salzer visited the Metropolitan Museum of Art and saw an exhibit of Limoges enamel, especially finding inspiration in the Grisaille technique. The technique was several hundred years old but had experienced a revival in the 1930s. Unable to find a practicing artist in the style, she and her husband researched the techniques with the aid of some manuals they found, and they eventually bought a kiln. The grisaille technique required a white enamel that was not commercially available, and so Salzer and Grossman returned to the manuals to find recipes that helped them make their own white glass which was ground into powder for use in painting. Enamel became her medium of choice, and in 1946 two portraits she painted using the technique were accepted into the Syracuse Ceramic National exhibition. She went on to participate in the exhibit nine more times, in 1947, 1948, 1950, 1951, 1952, 1954, 1956, 1958 and 1960. Her work was also regularly featured at the Wichita Art Museum, and in 1959 two portraits were exhibited at the Museum of Contemporary Crafts.

In 1950 Salzer and Grossman moved to Seattle, where she continued her work. Grossman died in 1957.

== Seattle career ==
Salzer continued to paint portraiture and with enamel, and her work was frequently shown at the Otto Seligman Gallery and the Frye Art Museum. She worked with, and painted, prominent Seattle artists James Washington Jr., George Tsutakawa, and Alfred Arreguin. Until her death she continued her work, even as she started to go blind in one eye, frequently drawing cartoons and illustrating cards in letters for friends and family.

Salzer was "very involved" with the Democratic Party, according to writer and friend Barbara Sleeper, who helped Salzer write her biography.

== Rediscovery ==
In 2002, Austrian art historian Christina Steinmetzer was researching the Zinkenbach group when she discovered that Lisel Salzer was still alive and working in Seattle. Salzer was the last of the group to survive. Steinmetzer referred to the group as a 'lost generation' because they were forced to flee the country, most of them never to return. Steinmetzer led a group of art historians in founding a museum in honor of the group, collecting stories and pieces to showcase their lives. With the discovery that Salzer was still alive, the museum held a special exhibit in her honor in 2002; Salzer was 96 years old. In 2003 the Austrian government honored her with its Cross of Merit in Gold, for her lifetime devotion to the arts.

Salzer died on December 6, 2005, at home in the Mount Baker neighborhood in Seattle.
