= Stephan Doesinger =

Austrian architect, designer and author

- Born: 1968 (age 57–58); Austria
- Education: University of Art and Design Linz; Architectural Association School of Architecture
- Occupations: Architect, designer, author
- Known for: Virtual architecture, Ars Electronica, Second Life architecture competition

Stephan Doesinger (born 1968) is an Austrian architect, designer and author based in Munich.

== Education ==
Doesinger studied painting and industrial design at the University of Art and Design Linz, graduating from the masterclass in metal design with a Magister Artium in 1993.. He subsequently completed a postgraduate diploma at the Architectural Association School of Architecture in London in 1994.

From 1996 to 1997, he was a resident scholar at the MAK Center for Art and Architecture in Los Angeles.

== Career ==
Following his studies, Doesinger worked in the studios of Alessandro Mendini in Milan and Ron Arad in London. In 1995, he designed the Prix Ars Electronica exhibition at the Ars Electronica Center in Linz. He subsequently served as art and creative director for several magazines, including Penthouse, Hideaways, Country Style, High Life and Yachting & Style.

In 2007, Doesinger initiated the 1st Annual Architecture and Design Competition in Second Life, an international competition seeking architectural designs within the virtual world. The competition was presented at the Ars Electronica Festival in Linz in September 2007, with the jury and prize ceremony held at the Zollverein UNESCO World Heritage Site in Essen. The project was also referenced in academic research on digital culture and media art.

In 2015, Doesinger founded Styliamo, a digital product customization platform based in Munich. The platform received the "Best Concept" award from Bayern Design at the Munich Creative Business Week.

Doesinger has held teaching positions at the Architectural Association School of Architecture in London, the University of Applied Arts Vienna and the Karlsruhe University of Arts and Design.

== Selected works ==
- Space Between People – How the Virtual Changes Physical Architecture. Prestel Publishing.
- Der veröffentlichte Raum. Merve Verlag.
- Learning from Sim City. Revolver Publishing.
- Elements of Time and Space. Ellipsis, London, 1998.

Doesinger has published essays in the Neue Zürcher Zeitung and Der Standard.
