= Museum of Applied Arts, Vienna =

Museum in Vienna, Austria

MAK – Austrian Museum of Applied Arts
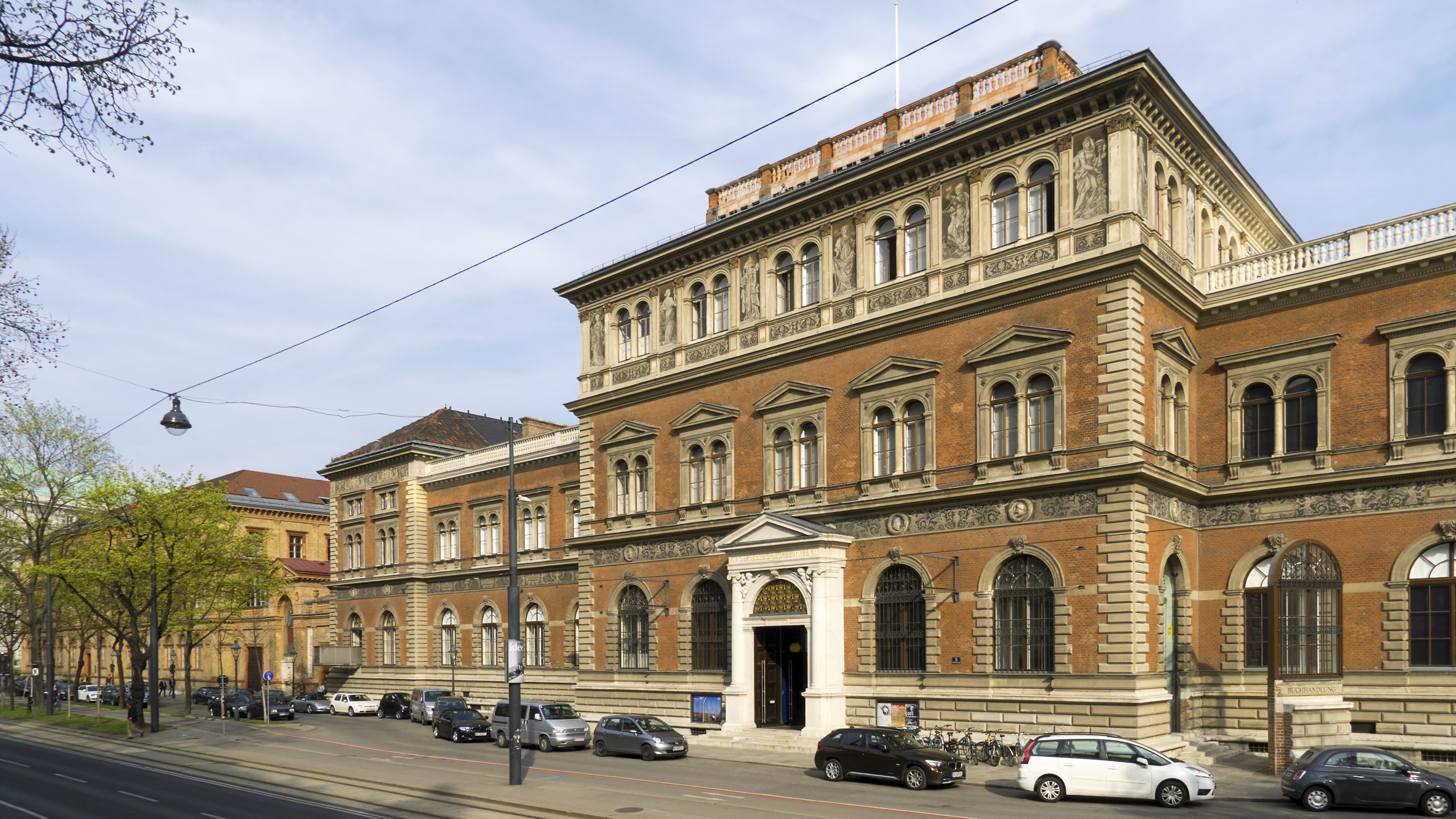
- Museum of Applied Arts in Vienna, Austria
- Former name: k. k. Österreichisches Museum für Kunst und Industrie
- Established: 1864
- Location: Stubenring 5, Vienna
- Coordinates: 48°12′28″N 16°22′53″E
- Type: Design Museum
- Director: Lilli Hollein
- Architect: Heinrich von Ferstel
- Public transit access: S-Bahn: S1, S2, S3, S7; City Airport Train; Landstraße (Vienna U-Bahn)
- Website: www.mak.at

The MAK – Museum of Applied Arts (German: Museum für angewandte Kunst) is an arts and crafts museum located at Stubenring 5 in Vienna's 1st district Innere Stadt. Besides its traditional orientation towards arts and crafts and design, the museum especially focuses on architecture and contemporary art. The museum has been at its current location since 1871. Since 2004 the building is illuminated in the evenings by the permanent outdoor installation "MAKlite" of American artist James Turrell. In 2015 the MAK became the first museum to use bitcoin to acquire art, when it purchased the screensaver "Event listeners" of van den Dorpel. With over 300,000 objects displayed online, the MAK presents the largest online collection within the Austrian Federal Museums. The audio guide to this museum is provided as a web-based app.

== History ==
On 7 March 1863, the Imperial Royal Austrian Museum of Art and Industry – today's MAK—was founded by Emperor Franz Joseph I. Rudolf von Eitelberger, the first Professor of art history at the University of Vienna, was appointed director. Following the example of London's South Kensington Museum (today's Victoria and Albert Museum) which was founded in 1852, the museum aims at serving as an exemplary collection for artists, industrialists, and the public and as an institution for education and training of designers and craftspeople. The museum opened on 12 May 1864, at first provisionally in rooms of the Ballhaus building next to the Vienna Hofburg, which were adapted for the purpose of the museum by architect Heinrich von Ferstel.

With the establishment of the k.k. Wiener Kunstgewerbeschule (Vienna School of Arts and Crafts) in 1867, theoretical and practical training was united. At first, the school was housed in the former gun factory at Währinger Straße 11–13/Schwarzspanierstraße 17 (nowadays the Anatomical Institute of the Medical University of Vienna which was newly constructed in 1886). Only after the construction of an extension next to the Imperial Royal Austrian Museum of Art and Industry, did the school move to Stubenring 3 in 1877.

1897, Arthur von Scala, until then director of the Royal Middle Eastern Museum (later Royal Austrian Trade Museum), takes over as director of the Museum of Art and Industry, bringing Otto Wagner, Felician von Myrbach, Koloman Moser, Josef Hoffmann and Alfred Roller on board to work at the museum and at the School of Arts and Crafts. Due to conflicts between Scala and the Arts and Crafts Association (founded in 1884), who sees his influence on the museum beginning to wane, Archduke Rainer resigns 1898 as the museum's protector. New statutes were drawn up. Two years later, around 1900, the museum and the School of Arts and Crafts each received their own separate administration, although their final separation did not take place until 1909: The museum was placed under the aegis of the Ministry of Culture and Education, the school stayed at the Royal Ministry of Cultus and Education. In 1907, the Museum of Art and Industry took over most of the collection of the Royal Austrian Trade Museum.

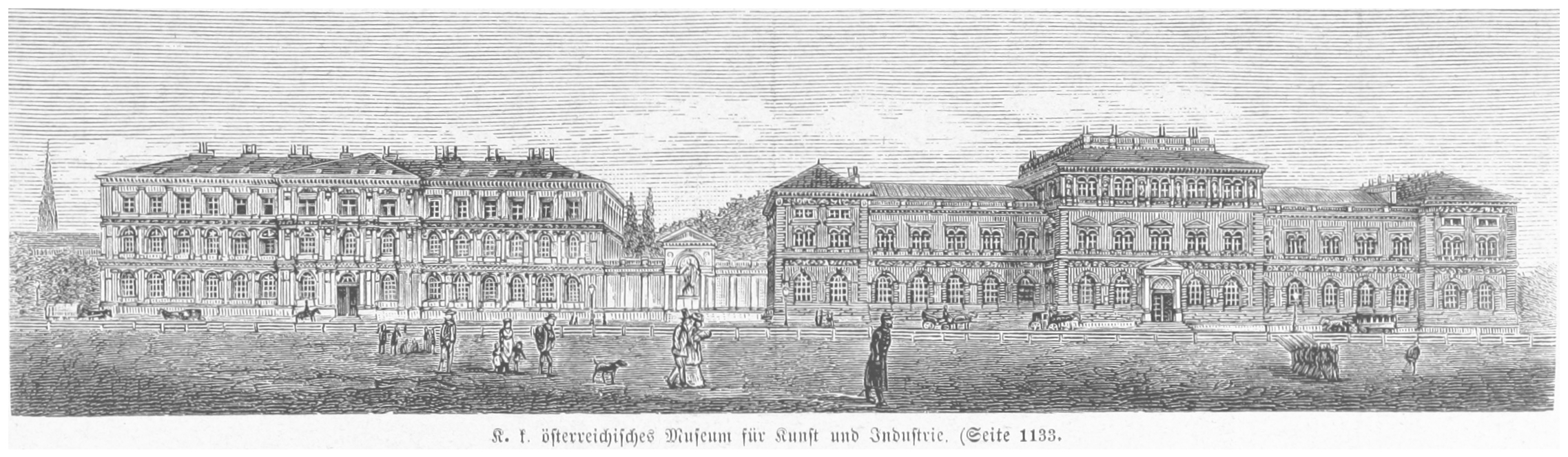
The MAK around 1880

From 1865 to 1897, the Museum of Art and Industry also published the magazine Mittheilungen des k. k. Österreichischen Museums für Kunst und Industrie (Transactions of the Imperial Royal Austrian Museum of Art and Industry). From 1898 to 1921, however, the Museum Journal was published with the new name Kunst und Kunsthandwerk and soon gained international reputation. The museum began publishing the periodical alte und moderne kunst (old and modern art).

After the establishment of the First Republic, the holdings previously in the possession of the Habsburgs—e.g. oriental carpets—were handed over to the Museum. In 1936 and 1940, the Museum on Stubenring gave part of its sculpture collection to the Kunsthistorisches Museum [Museum of Art History]. In exchange, it received the arts and crafts section of the collections of Albert Figdor and of the Kunsthistorisches Museum. Following Austria's annexation by Nazi Germany, the museum was renamed "Staatliches Kunstgewerbemuseum in Wien" (State Arts and Crafts Museum in Vienna). Between 1939 and 1945, Austria's museums take over several confiscated private collections. The collection of the "State Arts and Crafts Museum" also expanded in this way. Since 1998, numerous works of art have been restituted to their owners as a result of provenance research.

In 1947, the "Staatliches Kunstgewerbemuseum in Wien" (State Arts and Crafts Museum) was renamed "Österreichisches Museum für angewandte Kunst" (Austrian Museum of Applied Arts). In 1949, the museum reopened following the repair of war-related damage. In 1965, the Geymüllerschlössel in Vienna's 18th district was affiliated to the museum and became a new branch. At the same time as the building, the MAK also acquired Dr. Franz Sobek's important clock collection (160 Old-Viennese clocks from the time between 1750 and the second half of the 19th century) as well as furniture from the years 1800 to 1840. In the late 1980s, parts of the wall paintings were returned to their original state in the course of the renovation of the façade. The subsequent rearrangement of the furniture and the extraordinary clock collection in the rooms of the Geymüllerschlössel have provided visitors with an authentic insight into the diversity of Biedermeier interior decorating until today.

The combat Flak Tower (G-Tower) in the Arenbergpark—one of the six flak towers erected in Vienna during World War II—became an additional branch of the museum in 1994 and since 1995 has served as the MAK Contemporary Art Depot (MAK Tower), which hosts major parts of the Contemporary Art Collection of the museum. Currently, the MAK Tower is closed to the public due to a lack of official approval.

After a MAK exhibition about Josef Hoffmann in 1992 in his house of birth in Brtnice/Pirnitz (Czech Republic), contact with the Moravian Gallery in Brno(Czech Republic) has been intensified. Finally, since 2006 both institutions have managed Hoffmann's birthplace as a joint branch—the Josef Hoffmann Museum. The museum presents its collection in a permanent exhibition and, at the same time, temporary exhibitions about Josef Hoffmann and his contemporaries.

In 1994, MAK CEO and artistic director Peter Noever founded the branch MAK Center for Art and Architecture in Los Angeles, USA. The center is located in three important buildings of the Viennese architect Rudolph M. Schindler in Los Angeles (Rudolph Schindler House, Pearl M. Mackey Apartment House, Fitzpatrick-Leland House). The focus is on new trends and interdisciplinary developments in the fields of fine arts and architecture which are expedited through scholarships and projects and are expanded through temporary exhibitions.

One important sphere of influence of the MAK is its presentation in public space. The museum actively supports contemporary artists, whose works are mostly presented in an exhibition in the MAK building and later as works of art in Vienna's urban space in order to mediate at the interface between art and public space. International artists such as James Turrell (MAKlite, Permanent installation on the façade of the MAK since 2004, Stubenring 5, 1010 Vienna), Michael Kienzer (Stylit, 2005, Stubenring/Weiskirchnerstraße, 1010 Vienna), Franz West (4 Larvae (Lemur Heads) 2001, Stubenbrücke, 1010 Vienna), Donald Judd (Stage Set, 1996, Stadtpark, 1030 Vienna) and Philip Johnson (Wiener Trio, 1998, Franz-Josefs-Kai/Schottenring, opposite Ringturm, 1010 Vienna) have been represented.

In 2000, Austria's federal museums were removed from state administration; the museum became a "public-law academic institution".

In 2015, the MAK initiated the Vienna Biennale, the first Biennale to combine art, design and architecture. It lasted from 11 June to 4 October 2015 and was initiated by the MAK in partnership with the University of Applied Arts Vienna, Kunsthalle Wien, the Architekturzentrum Wien, and the Vienna Business Agency, creative center departure, and organized with support from the AIT Austrian Institute of Technology as a non-university research partner. The second Vienna Biennale took place from 21 June to 1 October 2017. The third Vienna Biennale took place from 29 May until 6 October 2019, the fourth from 28 May until 3 October 2021.

=== 27 August 2026 robbery ===
On 27 August 2026, during a jewelry exhibition, two unmasked men used hammers to steal the 673-diamond platinum necklace of former Egyptian Queen Nazli in a smash-and-grab heist. The necklace was stolen during the daytime by two men who purchased tickets to the museum. It has not been recovered. No one was hurt during the robbery, but several witnesses were present on the scene.

Austrian police have clear footage of the suspects, who walked out into the daytime streets directly after taking the necklace. Austrian authorities have added the necklace to a database of stolen artworks, according to Interpol.

Made by French jewlery house Van Cleef & Arpels in 1939, Sotheby’s auctioned the necklace for 3,600,000 – 4,600,000 USD in 2015. The collarette was commissioned by the Egyptian royal family for the marriage of Princess Fawzia of Egypt and the Crown Prince of Iran, Mohammad Reza Pahlavi. The 200 carat necklace is part of a larger set consisting of a tiara and pair of earrings. Queen Nazli wore the 673 diamond necklace at the event. Preliminary drawings for the collarette can be found on the Van Cleef & Arpels website.

The collarette is part of a larger exhibition titled GLANZSTÜCKE Van Cleef & Arpels High Jewelry × Masterpieces from the MAK Collection. The exhibition is on display from the 10th of June 2026 to the 27th of September 2026, and highlights the intersection of over 200 objects from MAK’s famous collection, including medieval textiles, with over 300 pieces of jewelry from the Van Cleef & Arpels patrimonial Collection. The exhibition focuses on the intersection of shared vision, passion, and inspiration across the collections, as well as their shared materials and unexpected parallels in figure, color, and recurring themes.

=== Directors ===
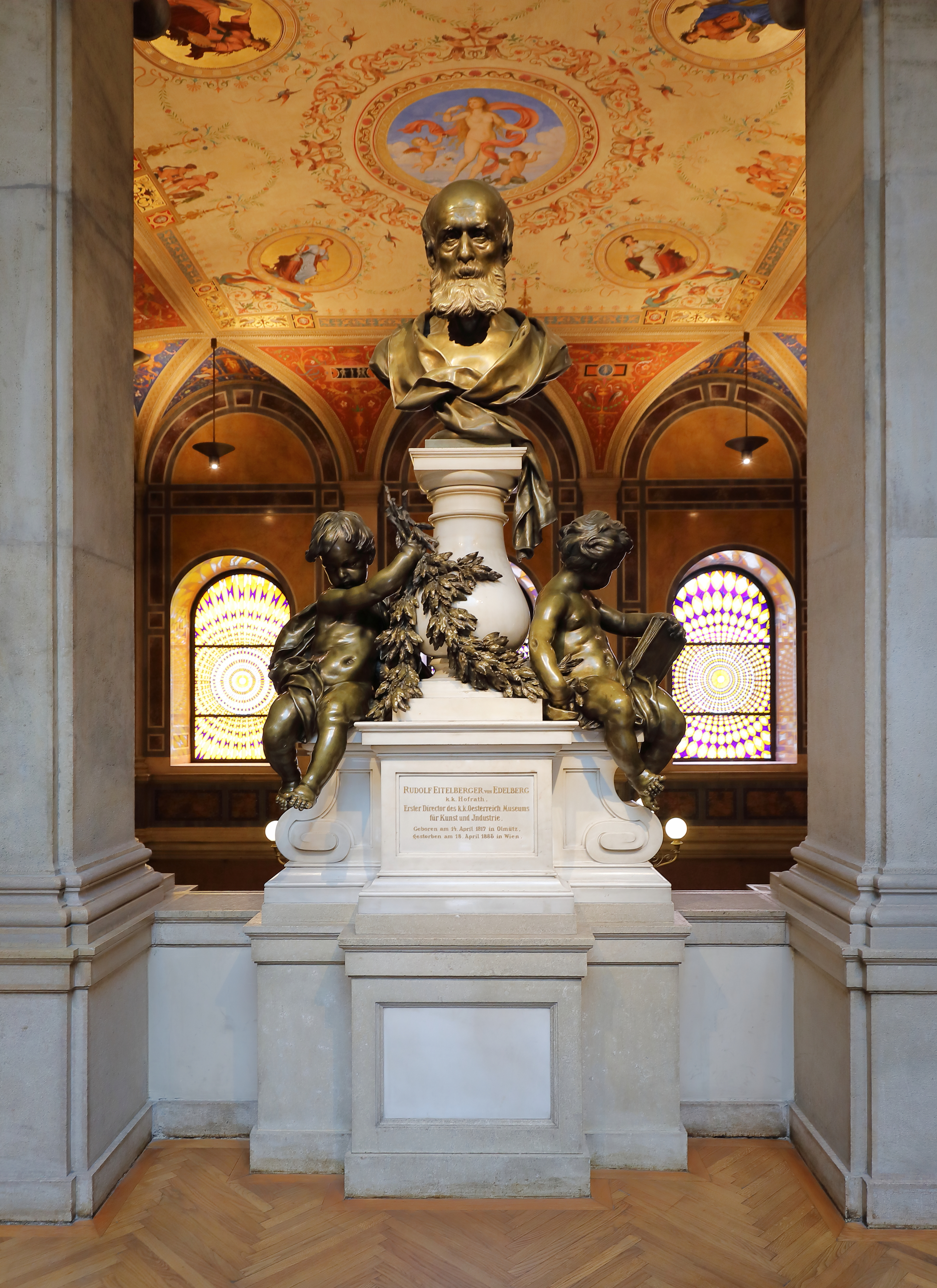
Eitelberger memorial in the MAK

- Rudolf Eitelberger (1863–1885)
- Jacob von Falke (1885–1895)
- Bruno Bucher (1895–1897)
- Arthur von Scala (1897–1909)
- Eduard Leisching (1909–1925)
- Hermann Trenkwald (1925–1927)
- August Schestag (1927–1932)
- Richard Ernst (1932–1950)
- Ignaz Schlosser (1950–1958)
- Viktor Griessmaier (1958–1968)
- Wilhelm Mrazek (1968–1978)
- Gerhard Egger (1978–1981)
- Herbert Fux (1981–1984)
- Ludwig Neustifter (Interim director, 1984–1986)
- Peter Noever (1986–2011)
- Martina Kandeler-Fritsch (Interim director, February to August 2011)
- Christoph Thun-Hohenstein (September 2011 to August 2021)
- Lilli Hollein (since September 2021)

In 2016, Christoph Thun-Hohenstein was appointed Director or rather General Director and artistic director of the MAK for another 5 years. At the same time, Teresa Mitterlehner-Marchesani—in the course of the introduction of joint management of the Austrian Federal Museums—was appointed managing director. In 2021 Lilli Hollein was appointed General Director and Artistic Director – she is the first female director in the MAK's history.

== Building ==
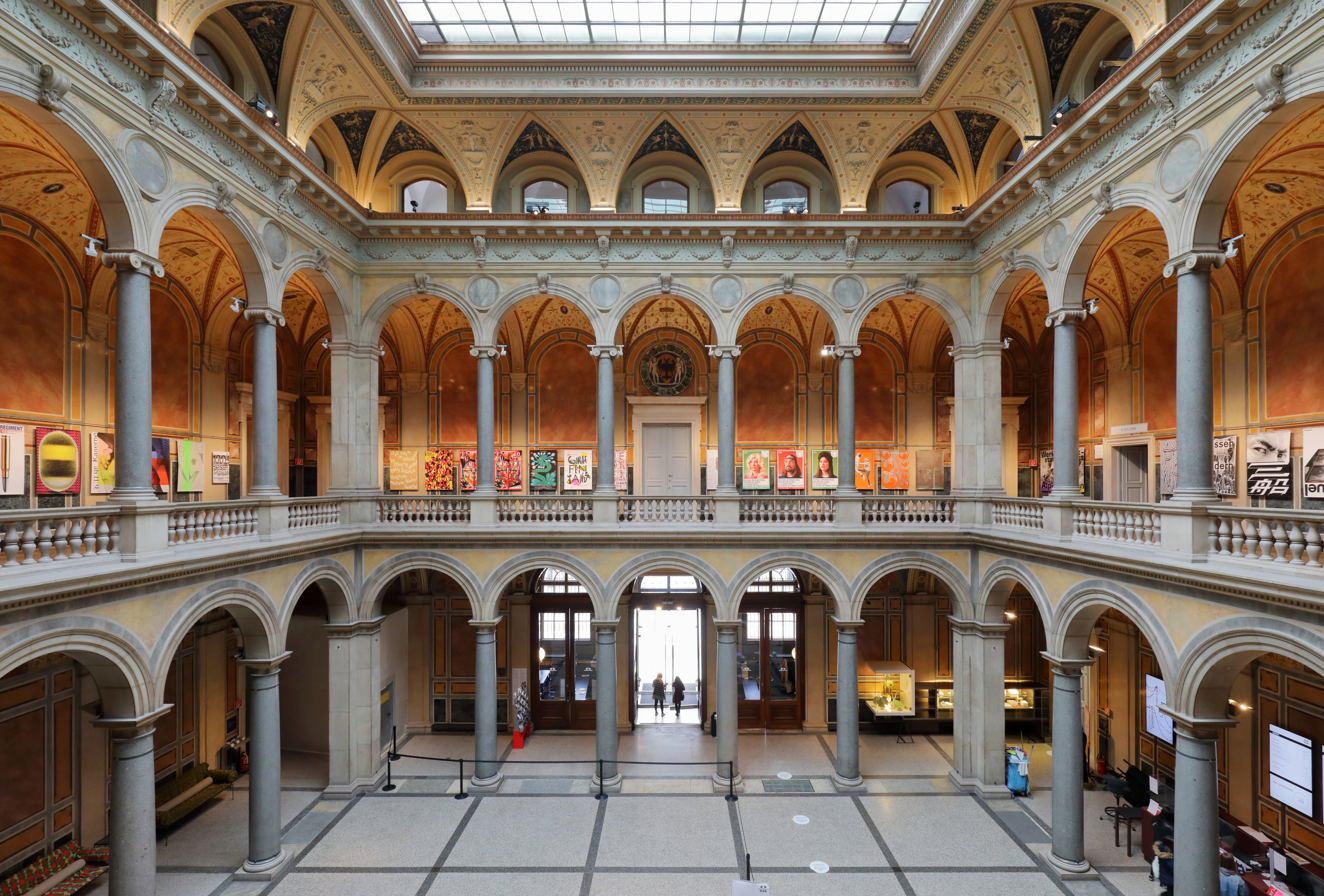
Inner courtyard of the museum

From 1869, a new museum complex for the Imperial Royal Museum of Art and Industry was built at Stubenring 5 in the style of the Neo-Renaissance, according to plans by Heinrich von Ferstel. The painter Ferdinand Laufberger made a frieze in sgraffito and the fresco paintings on the mirror vault of the staircase. On 15 November 1871, the museum opened to the public within a big opening. It was the first museum building on the Vienna Ring Road. Laufberger's cartoons were lost, and so around 1893 the mural painting of the figures on the outer façade were recreated by students of Karl Karger of the School of Applied Arts. In 1875 the Austrian Museum was joined by an adjacent new building for the School of Applied Arts at Stubenring 3, whose plans were also drawn up by Heinrich von Ferstel. It was opened in 1877.

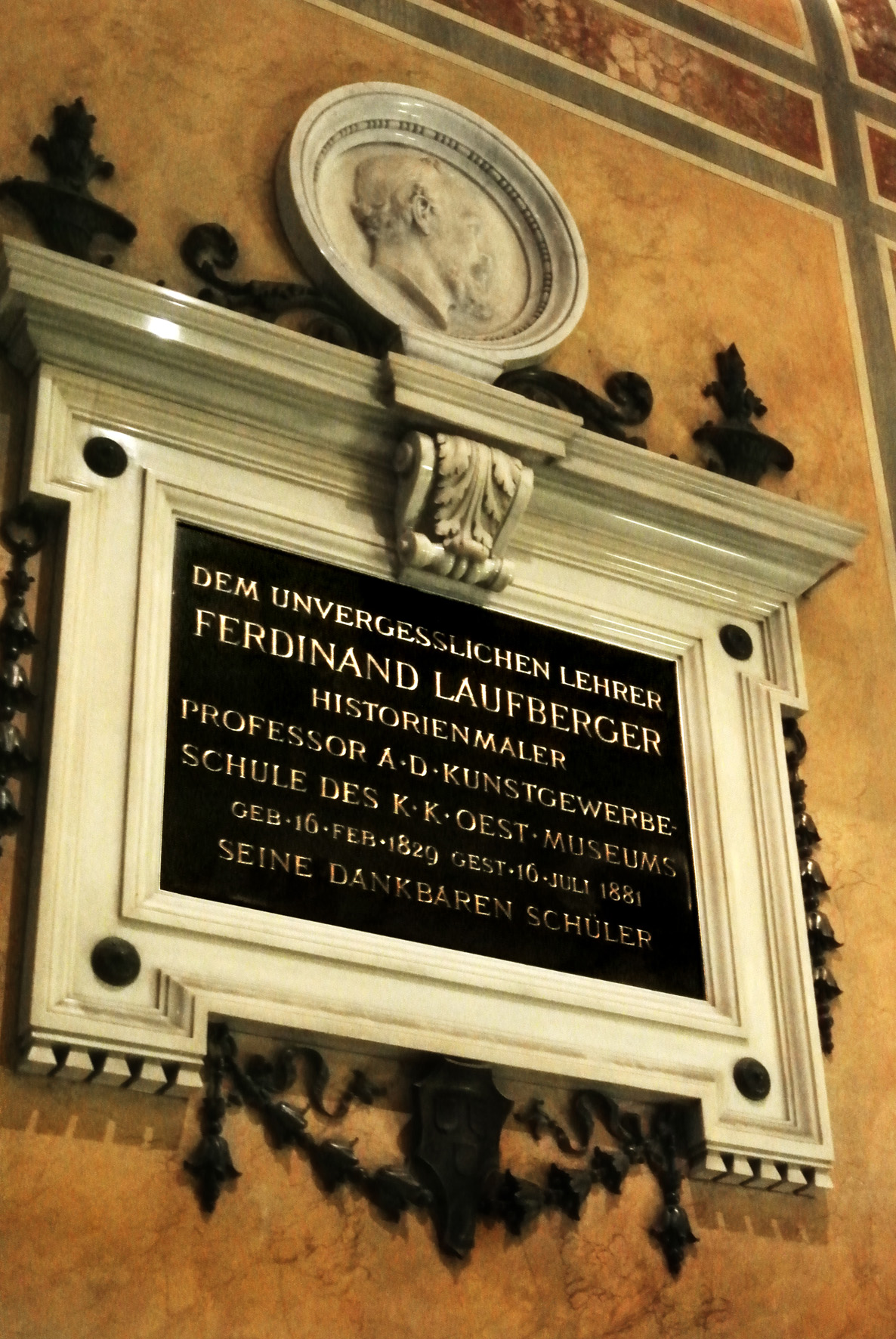
For the unforgettable teacher Ferdinand Laufberger

In 1906, Ludwig Baumann designed an extension building for the museum located at Weiskirchnerstraße 3, it was completed in 1908. After World War II repair of war-related damage to the museum building lasted until 1949.

In 1989, a complete renovation of the museum's old buildings and construction of both a two-story underground depot and a connecting wing by with a generous storage facility and additional exhibition space began. After this renovation, the museum opened in 1993. Its showrooms were designed by artists such as Barbara Bloom, Eichinger or Knechtl, Günther Förg, Gangart, Franz Graf, Jenny Holzer, Donald Judd, Peter Noever, Manfred Wakolbinger and Heimo Zobernig. In 2014, a repositioning of the Permanent Collection Carpets with an artistic intervention by Füsun Onur and a repositioning of the Permanent Collection Asia, whose artistic design was entrusted to Tadashi Kawamata in 2014 and 2016, took place.

The building in the Weiskirchnerstraße is reserved for temporary exhibitions, while the rooms at Stubenring host the permanent collections and the MAK DESIGN LAB.

=== MAK Permanent Collection ===
In accordance with its historical justification, the MAK Permanent collection is divided into different sections according to its functional purpose.

- Vienna 1900 Design / Arts and Crafts 1890–1938
- Carpets
- Asia. China – Japan – Korea
- Renaissance Baroque Rococo
- Baroque, Rococo, Classicism
- Empire Style Biedermeier
- Historicism Art Nouveau

Highlights of the collection are the holdings of the Wiener Werkstätte, chairs by Thonet and Kohn, furniture by Danhauser, Gustav Klimt's sketches for the mosaic frieze of the Stoclet Palace, Du Paquier's Porcelain Cabinet chamber from Dubsky Palace, a collection of Bohemian and Venetian glass, Flemish and Italian lace, silver, porcelain and carpets as well as Chinese porcelain, Japanese colored woodcuts (Ukiyo-e) and Japanese printing stencils (Katagami).

=== MAK Design Lab ===
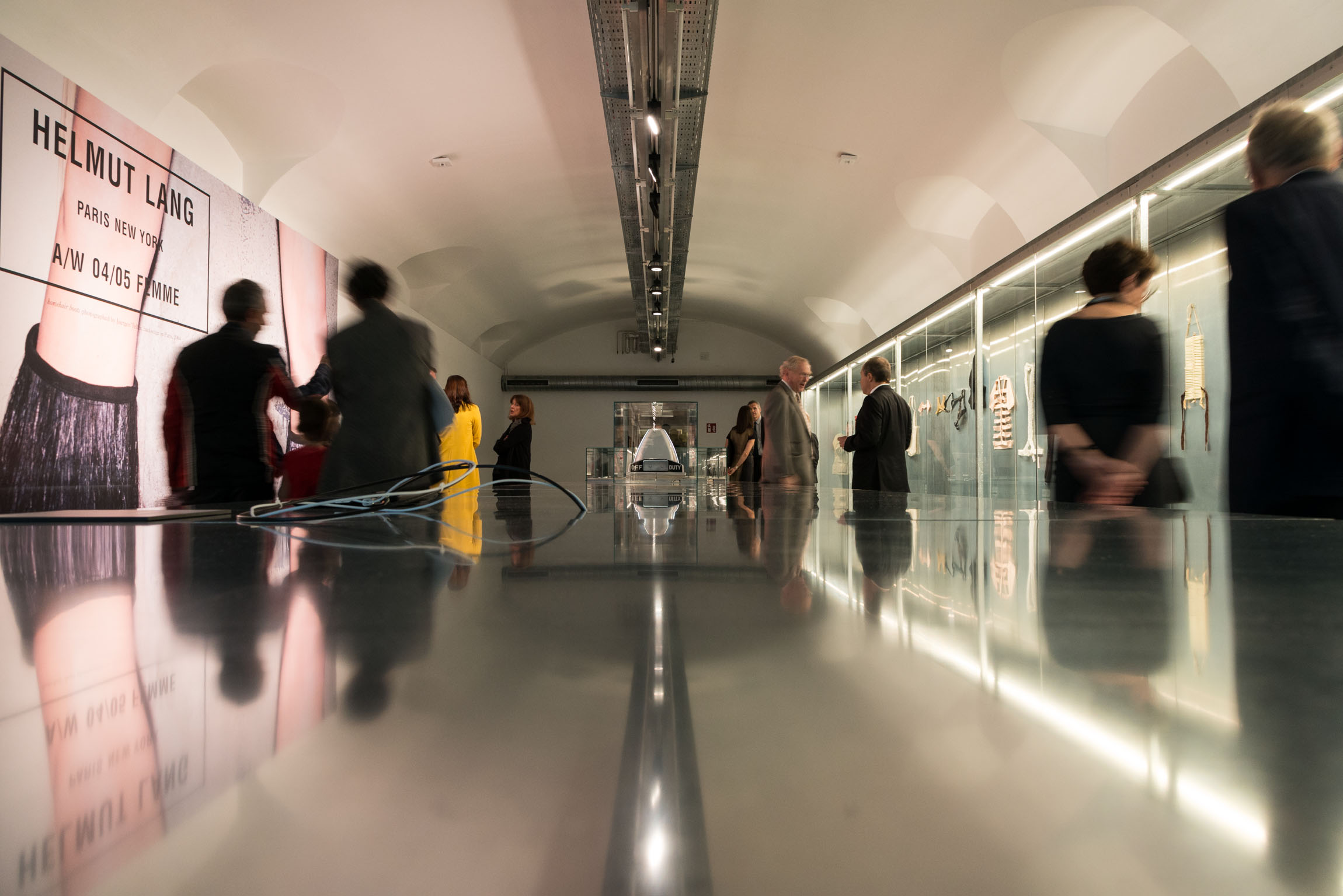
Visitors in the MAK Design Lab

On the occasion of its 150th anniversary, the MAK positioned itself more clearly than ever before as a museum for arts and the everyday world. Until 2014, the MAK Study Collection presented part of its extensive holdings in a material-specific technological order. In the course of this repositioning of the former study collection, MAK cooperated with the Austrian design team EOOS and the IDRV – Institute of Design Research Vienna in order to make cross-links between 21st century art and earlier epochs directly tangible.

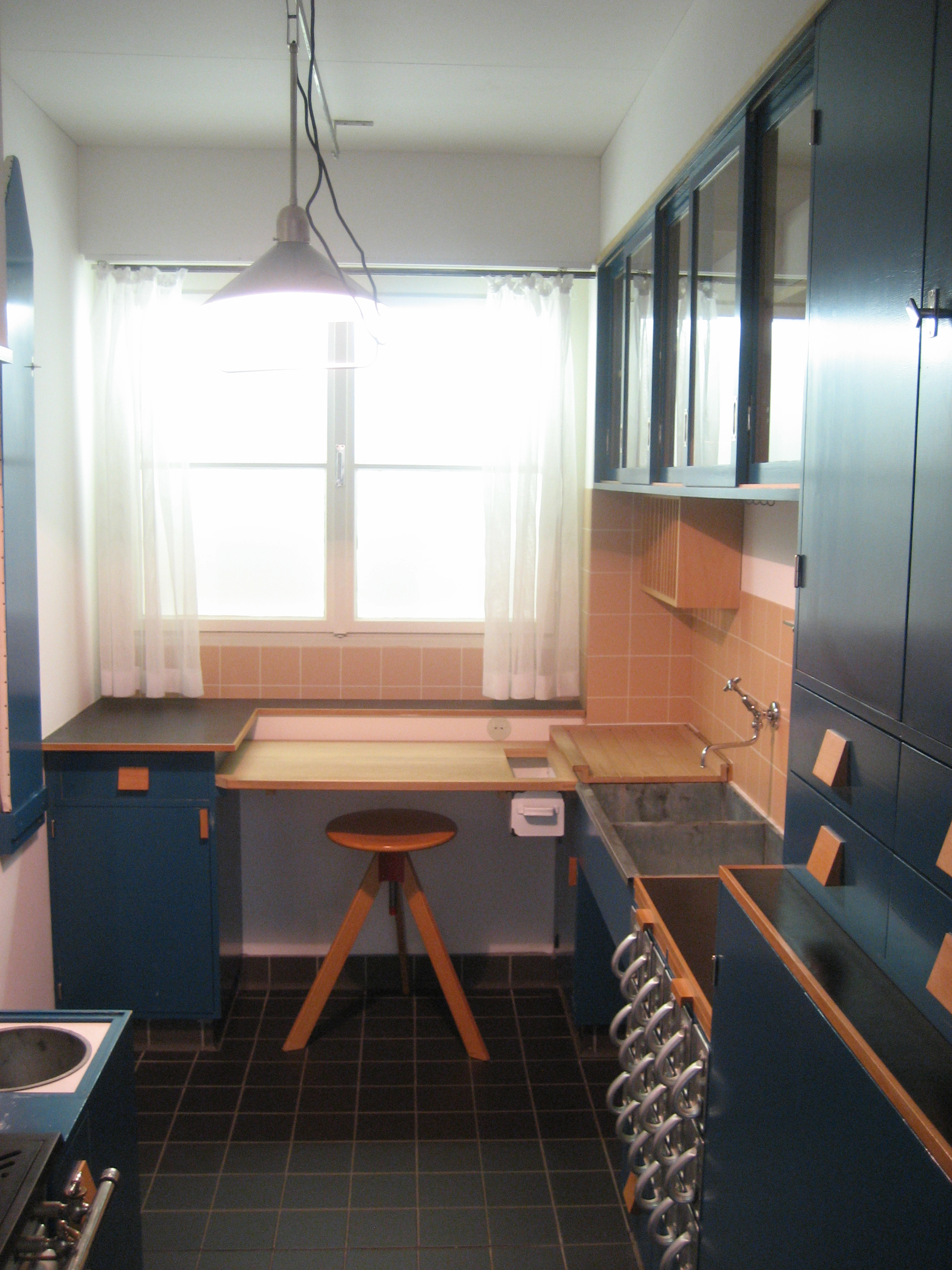
Frankfurt kitchen by Margarete Schütte-Lihotzky in the MAK-study collection

Since its transformation into the MAK Design Lab, almost 2,000 exhibits – divided into themed islands – have created a newly conceived showcase in the entire basement of the museum for lifelike references between historical arts and crafts and contemporary design. Interactive thematic areas form an illustrative course on areas such as cooking (including a replica of Margarete Schütte-Lihotzky's Frankfurt kitchen), eating and drinking, sitting, artistic, industrial and alternative production, transporting, communicating and ornament, and the Helmut Lang Archive, which shows the artistic highlights with selected designs.

The newly created passageways and modular units lead to a connecting spatial experience and allow rapid adaptation to changing requirements. The MAK Forum forms a flexibly usable space, which is used as a meeting place as well as an experimental area for exhibitions and mediation formats.

In the MAK Works on Paper Room temporary exhibitions take place—mostly from the holdings of the Library and the Works on Paper Collection—with a richness of topics presenting posters, architecture projects, style imitations, and Japanese woodblock prints, for example.

The MAK Library and Works on Paper Collection conveys information about all areas of applied art. The literature encompasses the time from the 16th century up to the present with some manuscripts, incunabulas, and printed works ranging from the 15th century until today. The Works on Paper Collection comprises ornamental engravings, posters, photos, hand drawings, watercolors, and plans as well as hand drawings from the archives of the Wiener Werkstätte.

The MAK Contemporary Art Collection serves as a presentation room for contemporary projects by international artists, i. a. engaging with topics from the fin de siècle period.

== Digital Museum ==
The MAK has a wide range of digital offerings. Data on the collection or the in-house publications are released for research and formats such as the MAK-Digistories or the MAK-Blog provide information on a wide variety of topics. The audio guide is provided free of charge in the form of a web-based app.

=== MAK Collection Online ===
With its MAK Collection Online the MAK makes large parts of its collection accessible to the public:

- Japanese colored woodcuts / Ukiyo-e
- East Asian Art
- Late antiquity textiles
- Posters
- Ornamental prints
- Wiener Werkstätte – Drawings
- Joseph Binder—Graphic Design
- English fabrics and wallpapers around 1900 (Arts and Crafts Movement)

With over 300.000 objects, the MAK shows the largest online collection within the Austrian Federal Museums.

=== Publications ===
Over 50.000 pages of the MAK's journals are available online.

=== Google Arts & Culture ===
Since May 2017, the MAK with its collection highlights can also be visited virtually on Google Arts & Culture: Gigapixel images of Gustav Klimt's design drawings for the execution of a frieze in the dining room of the Stoclet Palace in Brussels (1910–1911) can be seen as well as parts of the heroic epic Hamzanama, which is one of the major works of painting in the Islamic world.

=== 3D-Tours ===
Both the museum's main building as well as the Geymüllerschlössl can be discovered with 3D-tours. Furthermore, some exhibitions like Sheila Hicks were virtually available in 3D during the COVID-19 pandemic.

=== Multimedia and Games ===
In addition to video and audio formats, the MAK presented its first online games, "Mix MAK" and "World Wide Wonderland".

== Awards ==
- 1996: "Museum of the Year Award" from the Council of Europe, Strasbourg

== Exhibitions ==
- 2010: Firing Cells. About Having A Moment – curated by Gregor Eichinger
- 2010: Otto Neurath. Gypsy Urbanism
- 2010: Josef Dabernig. Excursus on Fitness
- 2010: Artists in focus: #8 Hans Weigand. Vortex
- 2010: Fat / Sam Jacob. Duplicate Array: Buildings / Places / Objects
- 2010: Ming. Interlude
- 2010: Ina Seidl. Jewelry
- 2010: Flowers for Kim Il Sung. Art and Architecture from the Democratic People's Republic of Korea
- 2010: Minimal. Art and Furniture from the MAK Collection
- 2010: Apokalypse / Keinen Keks heute. Otto Mühl
- 2010: Project Vienna. How to React to a City
- 2010: Josef Dabernig. 1 sculpture 2 versions
- 2010: Artists in focus #9 Plamen Dejanoff. Heads & Tails
- 2010: Design Criminals. Or a New Joy into the World curated by Sam Jacob
- 2010: Mihály Biró. Pathos in Red
- 2010: David Zink Yi. Manganese Make My Colors Blue
- 2010: Crossover. Two Collections – Private and Public
- 2010: Leather, Fabric and Zipper. Bags and Purses from the MAK Collection
- 2010: Contemporary. Jewelry from Austria. The "Eligius" Austrian Jewelry Design Award, 2010
- 2010: 100 Best Posters 09. Germany Austria Switzerland
- 2010: Andrea Branzi. The Weak Metropolis: for a "New Charter of Athens"
- 2010: Eva Schlegel. In Between
- 2011: Bruno. Bruno Kreisky as portrayed by Konrad Rufus Müller
- 2011: The Great Viennese Café: A Laboratory. Phase I
- 2011: APPLY! Taste Art
- 2011: Artists in focus #10 Erwin Wurm. Schöner Wohnen
- 2011: SPAN (Matias del Campo & Sandra Manninger). Formations
- 2011: Kurt Ryslavy. Collector, Wine Merchant, Sunday Painter. A Conceptual-Sculptural Intervention
- 2011: The Emperor's New Colors. 19th-Century Chinese Art from the MAK Collection
- 2011: The Second Skin. Objects for Packing and Preserving
- 2011: Industrial Furniture. Prototypes of the Modern Era
- 2011: Rudolf Steiner – Alchemy of the Everyday
- 2011: Artists in focus #11 Walter Pichler. Sculptures Models Drawings
- 2011: Michael Wallraff. looking up.vertical public space
- 2011: The Great Viennese Café: A Laboratory. Phase II & Experimental Design
- 2011: Artists' Books on Tour. Artist Competition and Mobile Museum
- 2011: Gôm Sú'. Ceramics from Viêt Nam, a 2000-Year History
- 2011: 2 x 100 Best Posters at the MAK
- 2011: Envisioning Buildings: Reflecting Architecture in Contemporary Art Photography
- 2012: Patrick Rampelotto. Adventures in Foam
- 2012: The Magic of Diversity. The MAK as Applied Space of the Future
- 2012: Gustav Klimt. Cartoons for the Mosaic Frieze at Stoclet House
- 2012: sound:frame festival 2012. Exhibition "substructions"
- 2012: ...Furniture of All Kinds. Design drawings from the Danhauser Furniture Factory
- 2012: Stiefel & Company Architects. Faux Terrains
- 2012: Made 4 You. Design for Change
- 2012: Things. plain & simple
- 2012: Kurt Spurey. Sedimente. Chawan. 4 Colors 4 Forms
- 2012: Benjamin Hirte. the classic mob ballet
- 2012: taliaYsebastian. The Committee of Sleep
- 2012: Masterpieces
- 2012: Contemporary Necklaces
- 2012: Others curated by Pae White
- 2012: Vienna 1900. Viennese Arts and Crafts, 1890–1938
- 2012: 100 Best Posters 11. Germany Austria Switzerland
- 2012: WerkStadt Vienna. Design Engaging the City
- 2012: Kathi Hofer. craftivism
- 2013: Nippon Chinbotsu. Japan Sinks. A Manga
- 2013: Signs Taken in Wonder. Searching for Contemporary Istanbul
- 2013: Marco Dessí. Still Life
- 2013: A Shot of Rhythm and Color. English Textile Design of the late 19th Century
- 2013: JEX – Jewelry Exhibition. Jewelry by Petra Zimmermann
- 2013: Loos. Our Contemporary
- 2013: Kerstin von Gabain. City of Broken Furniture
- 2013: Verena Dengler.
- 2013: Lisa Truttmann. My Stage is your Domain
- 2013: Sonic Fabric feat. BLESS N°45 Soundperfume engineered by Popkalab
- 2013: 100 Best Posters 12. Germany Austria Switzerland
- 2013: Pae White. Orllegro
- 2013: Scientific Skin feat. Bare Conductive in collaboration with Fabio Antinori + Alicja Pytlewska
- 2013: Franz von Zülow. Paper
- 2014: sound:frame 2014. If this is the Answer, what is the Question?
- 2014: soma architecture. Immanent Elasticity
- 2014: After-Images.150 Years of the MAK – Exhibitions in Pictures
- 2014: Exemplary.150 Years of the MAK – from Arts and Crafts to Design
- 2014: Hollein.
- 2014: Hanna Krüger [Die Sammlung] a collective structure
- 2014: South meets North: Local Innovation. Global Conversation
- 2014: Tomorrow is...
- 2014: Valentin Ruhry. Grand Central
- 2014: 100 Beste Posters 13. Germany Austria Switzerland.
- 2014: Schwadron Brothers: new places und traces
- 2014: I Santillana.
- 2014: photo::vienna. Retrospective 2014
- 2014: Ways to Modernism. Josef Hoffmann, Adolf Loos, and Their Impact
- 2015: Jewellery 1970–2015. Bollmann Collection. Fritz Maierhofer – Retrospective
- 2015: Eoos. Design between Archaic and High Tech
- 2015: Alfredo Barsuglia. Cabinet
- 2015: Amie Siegel. Provenance
- 2015: Future Light. Escaping Transparency
- 2015: Uneven Growth. Tactical Urbanisms for Expanding Megacities
- 2015: 2051. Smart Life in the City
- 2015: The Art of Working – Agency in Digital Modernity
- 2015: Mapping Bucharest. Art, Memory, and Revolution 1916–2016
- 2015: 24/7. the human condition
- 2015: Christoph Niemann. Drawing the Line
- 2015: photo::vienna. Retrospective 2015
- 2015: Villa Tugendhat
- 2015: Stefan Sagmeister: The Happy Show
- 2015: 100 Best Posters 14. Germany Austria Switzerland
- 2015: Josef Frank. Against Design.
- 2016: Fashion Utopias. Haute Couture in the Graphic Arts
- 2016: Kay Walkowiak. Forms in Time.
- 2016: Josiah McElehny. The Ornament Museum
- 2016: Robert La Roche. Personal View
- 2016: Friedrich Kiesler. Life Visions
- 2016: Eligius Award 2016. Jewelry in Austria
- 2016: 100 Beste Posters 15. Germany Austria Switzerland
- 2016: City Factory. Social Furniture Collection by Eoos
- 2016: photo::vienna. Retrospective 2016
- 2016: Shunga. Erotic Art from Japan
- 2016: Patrycja Domanska. Stimuli
- 2016: The Goldscheider Company. Viennese Ceramics 1885–1938
- 2016: handiCRAFT. Traditional Skills in the Digital Age
- 2017: The Glass of the Architects. Vienna 1900–1937
- 2017: Glasses from the Empire and Biedermeier Period
- 2017: Book Covers of the Wiener Werkstätte
- 2017: 650 Years of Gold- and Silversmiths. The Competitions
- 2017: Library for Social Design
- 2017: Hello, Robot. Design between Human and Machine. An exhibition of the MAK, the Vitra Design Museum, and the Design Museum Gent
- 2017: CityFactory: New Work. New Design
- 2017: What Do We Want? Dimensions of a New Digital Humanism
- 2017: LeveL. the fragile balance of utopia
- 2017: ich weiß nicht. Growing Relations between Things.
- 2017: Artificial Tears. Singularity & Humanness—A Speculation
- 2017: Design for Agency.
- 2017: photo::vienna. Retrospective 2017
- 2017: 100 Best Posters 16. Germany Austria Switzerland
- 2017: Thomas Bayrle. If It's Too Long—Make It Longer
- 2017: Aesthetics of Change:150 Years of the University of Applied Arts Vienna
- 2018: Klimt's Magic Garden. A Virtual Reality Experience by Frederick Baker
- 2018: Gustav Peichl. 15 Buildings for His 90th
- 2018: 300 YEARS OF THE VIENNA PORCELAIN MANUFACTORY
- 2018: POST-OTTO WAGNER: From the Postal Savings Bank to Post-Modernism
- 2018: 100 BEST POSTERS 17. Germany Austria Switzerland
- 2018: SAGMEISTER & WALSH: Beauty

== MAK Branches ==
The MAK Branches cover several continents and countries:

- Vienna: MAK Branch Geymüllerschlössel MAK Tower Contemporary Art Depot at the Arenbergpark (currently closed) MAK Art in Public Space
- Czech Republic: Josef Hoffmann-Museum, Brtnice/Pirnitz (since the beginning of 2006, a joint branch of the Moravian Gallery in Brno and MAK Vienna)
- USA: MAK Center for Art and Architecture, Los Angeles (Rudolph Schindler House, Pearl M. Mackey Apartment House, Fitzpatrick-Leland House).

== Nearby buildings ==
- Stadtpark, Vienna
- Urania
- Café Prückel
- Wien Mitte railway station
- Austrian Postal Savings Bank
- Hotel Intercontinental Vienna
- Konzerthaus, Vienna
- Kursalon Hübner
- Stephansplatz, Vienna
