= Geymüllerschlössel =

Coordinates: 48°14′38″N 16°18′26″E

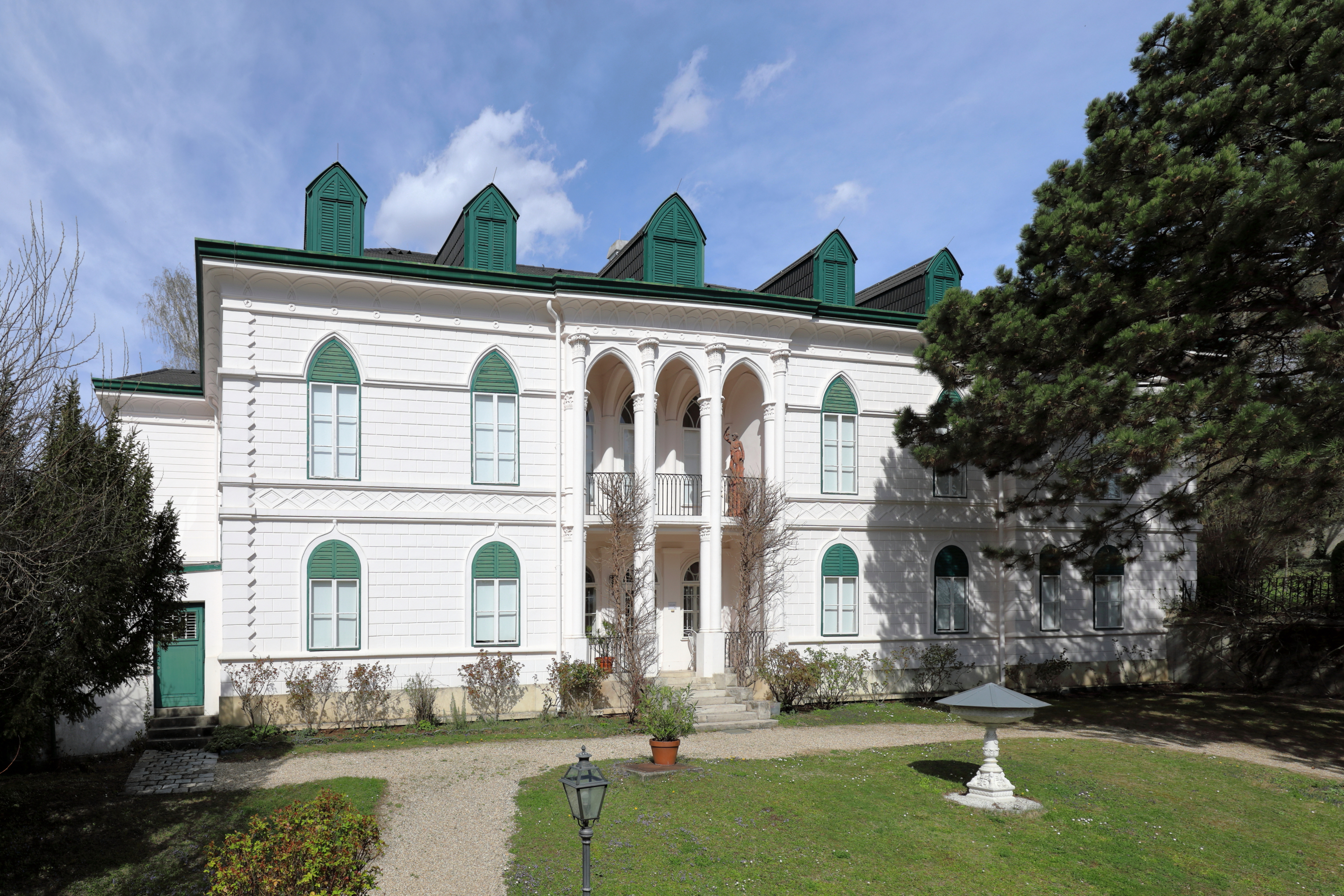
The Geymüllerschlössel in Vienna, houses today the Biedermeier collection of the Museum of Applied Arts

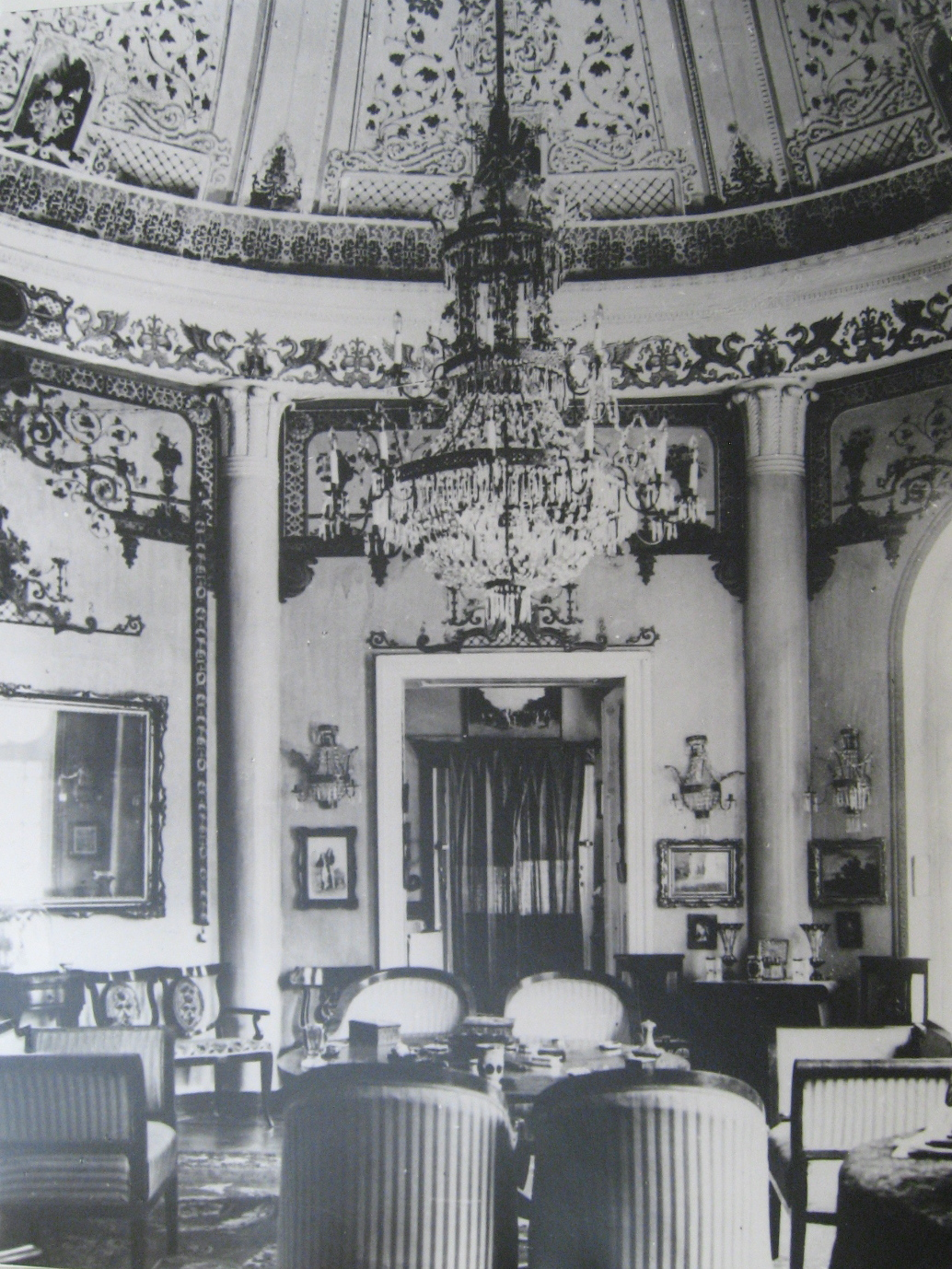
Salon of the Geymüllerschlössel, taken in the 1930s

The Geymüllerschlössel is a small palace situated in Pötzleinsdorf, a neighborhood in Vienna's suburban outskirts. It is a branch of the Museum of Applied Arts and Contemporary Art, displaying a diverse collection of furniture and decorative art from the Biedermeier period as well as Franz Sobek's clock collection.

== History ==
The mansion was built in 1808 as a summer residence for the Viennese merchant and banker Johann Jakob Geymüller (1760–1834) who was the brother of Johann Heinrich Geymüller, the landlord and owner of Schloss Pötzleinsdorf. Geymüllerschlössel is furnished with original furniture from the first half of the 19th century. Its architectural style features the blend of Gothic, Indian and Arab elements typical especially of pleasure palaces at the time.

The estate was passed between a number of different owners before coming into the possession of the Museum of Applied Arts and Contemporary Art (MAK) in the 1960s. Isidor Mautner, a textile industrialist, bought the palace in 1888 and mortgaged it to the Austrian National bank in the late 1920s. After the annexation of Austria to Nazi-controlled Germany, Mautner's Jewish heir. were forced to flee the country in 1938, resulting in the mortgage on the estate being transferred to Germany's Reichsbank. It was returned to the Austrian National bank after World War II had ended and was later bought by the Republic of Austria in 1948. In the following years, the villa's renovation was overseen by Franz Sobek, who had provided the funds for the purchase of the palace.

It was eventually incorporated into the MAK as a museum branch in 1965, when Sobek was bought out of his rights to the property. Taking into possession the Geymüllerschlössel, the MAK also took over Franz Sobek's collection of Viennese clocks from the 18th and 19th century as well as furniture from the first half of the 19th century.

== Exhibitions ==
Over the past years, the Geymüllerschlössel hosted a number of exhibitions focusing on contemporary design interventions and comparisons, including Time & Again by designer Michael Antassiades, The Stranger Within by Studio Formafantasma, Robert Stadler's Back in 5 min and Biedermeier reanimated by Clegg & Guttman.
