= Matias del Campo =

Chilean-born Austrian architect and designer

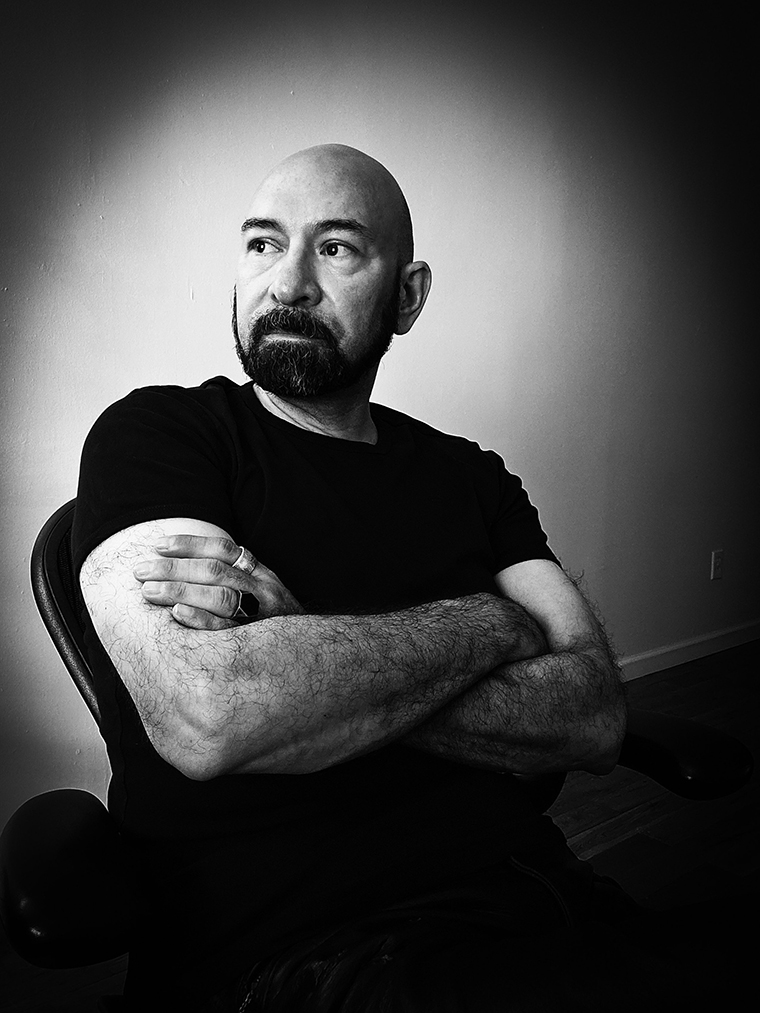
- Matias del Campo in 2024
- Born: Matias del Campo; Chile
- Education: University of Applied Arts Vienna; The Royal Melbourne Institute of Technology
- Occupation: Architect
- Practice: SPAN
- Website: https://span-arch.org/

Matias del Campo is a Chilean-born Austrian architect, designer, and theorist, and the co-founder of the architectural practice SPAN. He is at the forefront of integrating architecture with artificial intelligence, and his research and publications have paved the way for this emerging field.

== Education and early career ==
Matias del Campo graduated from the University of Applied Arts Vienna in 2003, earning a Master of Architecture with distinction. In 2018, he received his Ph.D. from the Royal Melbourne Institute of Technology.

His design philosophy reflects his exploration of contemporary tendencies, representing a synthesis of “materialization protocols in nature, cutting-edge technologies and philosophical inquiry which together form a comprehensive design ecology”.

During his tenure at the Hans Hollein studio at the University of Applied Arts Vienna, he was first introduced to Computational Design, being one of the students chosen by Hollein to learn programming in UNIX and to test 3D modeling packages.

== SPAN ==
In 2003, alongside architect Sandra Manninger, he founded the architectural practice SPAN, a firm with offices in Vienna and Shanghai, and one of the first offices in Vienna to focus on computational design.

Initially, the practice gained recognition in Vienna for its radically advanced projects, receiving support from the Architecture Centre Vienna, which showcased their work and commissioned the firm for exhibition designs and for the remodeling of the center's headquarters, and awarded them an Austrian Experimental Architecture Award. The studio views architecture as a process.

SPAN began gaining international recognition in 2010, when the architects won the competition for the Austrian Pavilion at the Shanghai World Expo, as well as for the new Brancusi Museum in Paris, France. In 2011, Museum of Applied Arts in Vienna invited SPAN to hold a solo exhibition in its gallery. Other architectural practices invited to the exhibition series include Greg Lynn, Asymptote, FOA, and Lebbeus Woods.

Now an internationally recognized practice, SPAN's work has been featured at the 2012 Venice Architecture Biennale, ArchiLab 2013 at the FRAC Centre, Orléans, France, the 2008 and 2010 Architecture Biennales in Beijing, and in the 2011 solo exhibition ‘Formations’ at the Museum of Applied Arts in Vienna. In 2017, SPAN's work was highlighted in a solo exhibition at the Fab Union Gallery in Shanghai, China.

Most recently, SPAN's work was featured in /imagine: A Journey into The New Virtual, an exhibition at the MAK Museum of Applied Arts. Their installation The Doghouse, is a large scale model created from 2D images generated with Midjourney. Within the model, Sony AIBO7 robots interact with the space, while simultaneously using computer vision to livestream the experience beyond the museum.

The practice is known for actively engaging in building design while simultaneously developing the theoretical and discursive foundations for innovatice approaches. All projects are conceptualized as vehicles for exploration.

== Teaching and academic roles ==
Matias del Campo currently teaches as an associate professor of Architecture at the New York Institute of Technology.

Until 2024, he was an associate professor of architecture at the Taubman College of Architecture and Urban Planning at the University of Michigan, where he also served as Affiliated Faculty with Michigan Robotics.

He has also lectured at the University of Pennsylvania, Penn Design Philadelphia, and served as a guest professor at the Dessau Institute of Architecture in Germany.

At ACADIA he served as Development Office within the Board of Directors (2019–2023) and as Conference Chair (2016 and 2020).

He has lectured worldwide, at institutions such as IAAC, in January 2017, RMIT Australia in 2015, The University of Tokyo in July 2015, La Sapienza in Rome in February 2015, University of Applied Arts Vienna, UCLA, University Innsbruck in 2012 and Hyperbody Studio TU Delft in the Netherlands in 2008.

== Publications ==
Del Campo has authored several books exploring the intersection of artificial intelligence and architecture. His work includes more than 50 articles cited in his Google Scholar profile, ranging from peer-reviewed papers to published books.

His latest book, Diffusions in Architecture: Artificial Intelligence and Image Generators (2024), examines the role of generative AI tools such as DALL·E 2, Stable Diffusion, and Midjourney in reshaping the architectural approaches to design.

In Artificial Intelligence in Architecture (Architectural Design) (2024), he curates a critical discussion on AI-driven design methodologies, questioning authorship and agency in an era where synthetic imagination plays an increasing role.

In Neural Architecture (2022), he investigates the relationship between artificial intelligence and architectural design, addressing its material and symbolic implications.

Sublime Bodies, Architectural Problems in the Postdigital Age (2017) explored postdigital design philosophies and computational aesthetics, published by Tongji University Press, Shanghai, and is featured both in Chinese and English.

Matias del Campo served as guest editor for Next Generation Building, published by TU Delft, in March 2016. He also served as Guest-Editor for the November 2016, May 2022 and May 2024 issues of the AD Journal in London, UK.

Additionally, he has contributed to numerous publications in the field of Computational Design, such as Marjan Colletti's Digital Poetics (Ashgate 2013) or Mark Burry's Scripting Culture: Architectural Design and Programming (Wiley 2011).

== Research and awards ==
Del Campo is at the forefront of artificial intelligence research applied to architecture.

In AI, Architecture, accessibility, and data justice—ACADIA special issue, Del Campo and collaborators explore the evolution of architecture in the AI era through a series of nine articles, discussing the questions, problems and opportunities that AI brings to the field.

In his 2022 peer-reviewed journal article "Deep House – Datasets, Estrangement, and the Problem of the New" he aims to “discusse the application of artificial intelligence (AI) in the design of the Deep House project (Fig. 1), an attempt to use estrangement as a method to emancipate a house from a canonical approach to the progressive design of a one-family house project.”

In 2015, Matias del Campo received the Accelerate@CERN Award, granted by Accelerate Austria supported by the Department of Arts of the Federal Chancellery of Austria, a one-month artist residency at CERN. The program is aimed at artists spending time within a scientific laboratory for the first time. Together with Sandra Manninger, the architects spent May 2016 at CERN, their research being true to that of SPAN philosophy, aiming to “go beyond beautiful data to discover something that could be defined voluptuous data. This coagulation of numbers, algorithms, procedures and programs uses the forces of thriving nature and, passing through the calculation of a multi-core processor, knits them with human desire.”

In 2024, Del Campo received the ACADIA Innovative Research Award of Excellence.

In 2023 he was awarded the University of Michigan Provost Teaching Innovation Award.
