= The Pit (Breitenbrunn am Neusiedlersee, Austria) =

Coordinates: 47°57′06″N 16°43′35″E

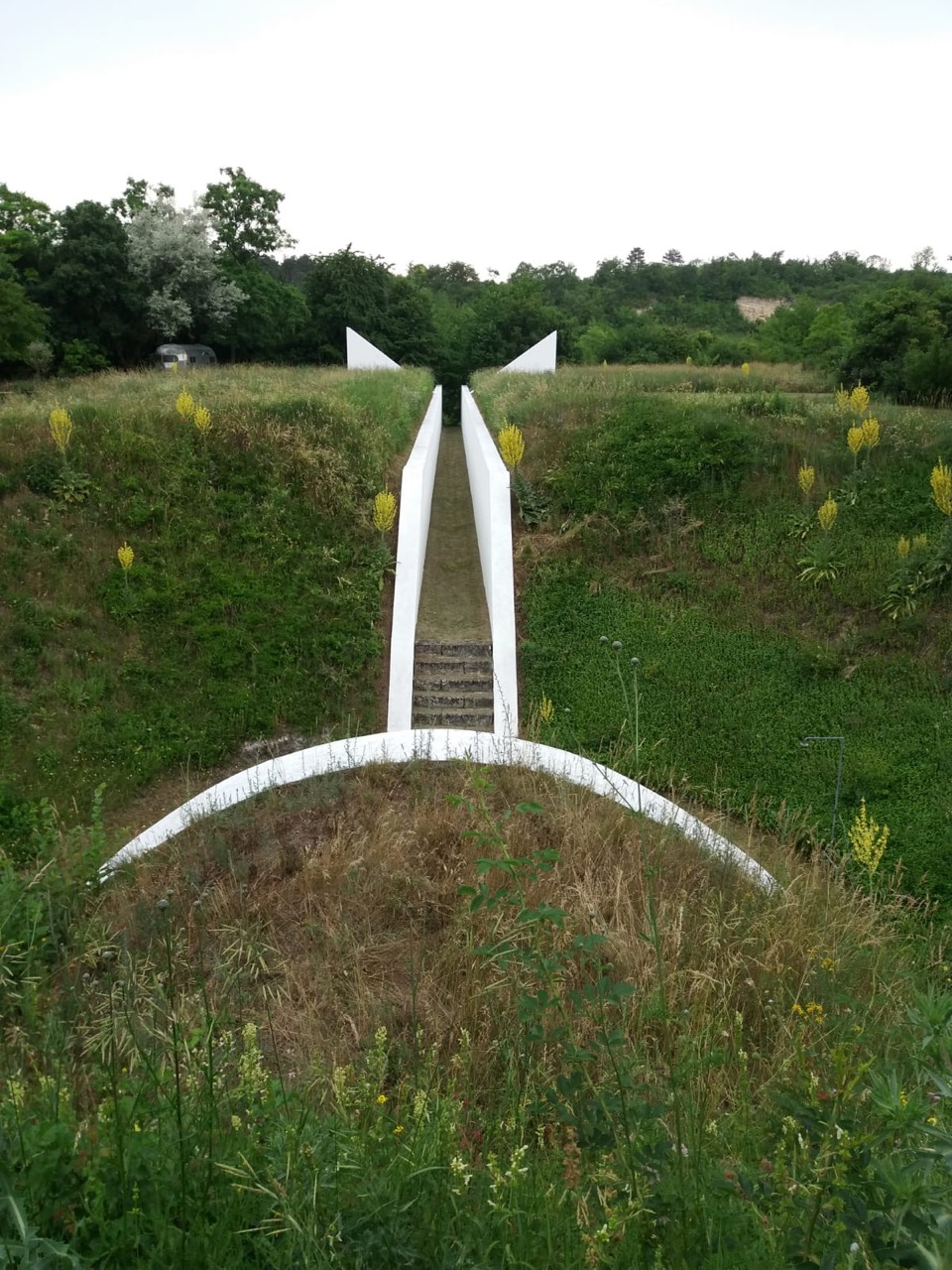
traditional winecellar in Burgenland, "The Pit", "Steinbruchgang mit Flügeltreppen", Peter Noever's land art project in Breitenbrunn on Lake Neusiedl, Austria

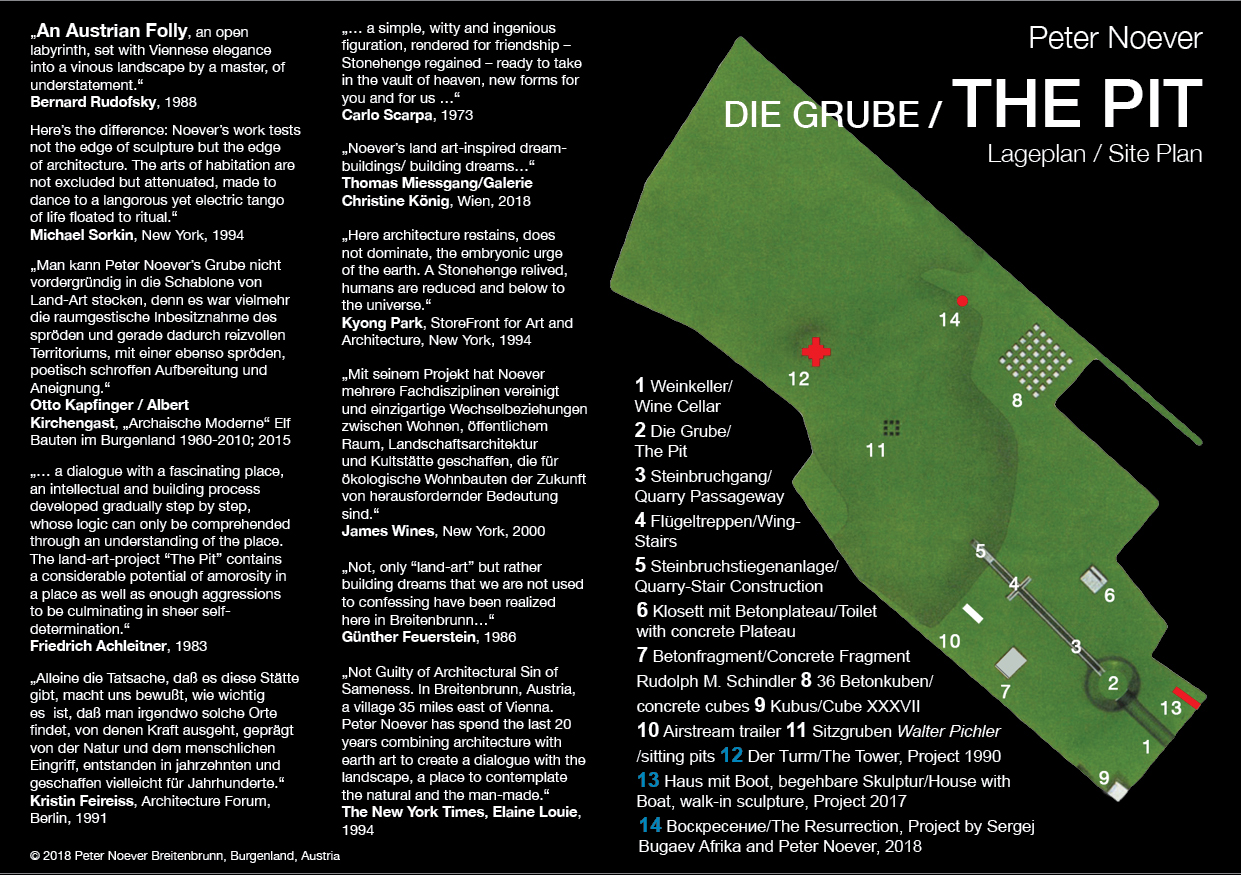
"The Pit", site map and statements, Peter Noever's land art project in Breitenbrunn on Lake Neusiedl, Austria

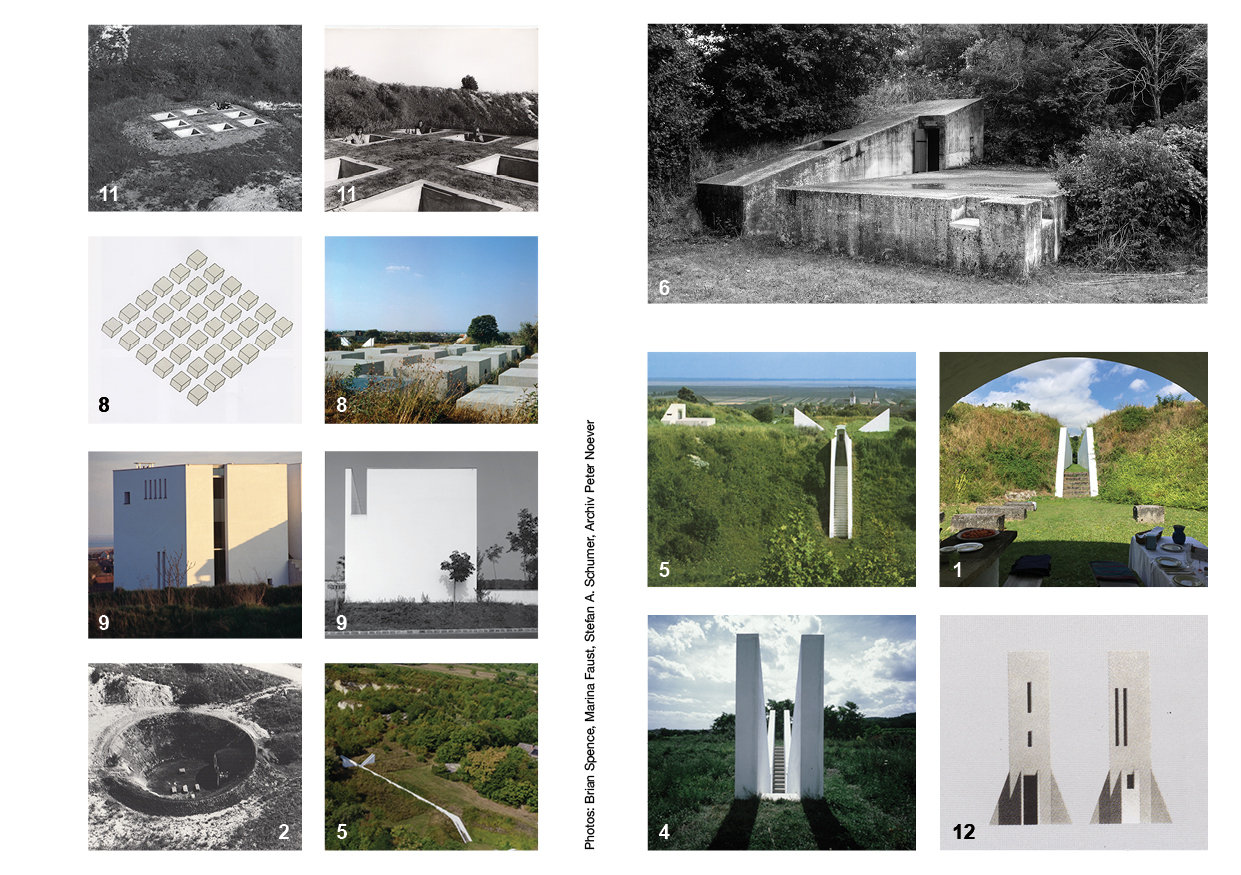
"The Pit", overview of various projects, Peter Noever's land art project in Breitenbrunn on Lake Neusiedl, Austria

The Pit (Breitenbrunn am Neusiedlersee, Austria) is a land art project by Peter Noever in Breitenbrunn which has existed since the early 1970s and in 2019 was placed under monument protection by the Austrian Federal Office BDA. "The Pit" is located at a site of a 200+ year old, sandstone-built wine cellar. It contains an open air double toilet that has been described as the "Most elegant outdoor toilet of all time" by a critic of architecture. The work also contains 36 cubes made from concrete with Vistus trees grow in the open centers of the cubes.

== Literature ==
- Albert Kirchengast, Norbert Lehner: Archaische Moderne – Elf Bauten im Burgenland 1960–2010 Vienna 2010, ISBN 978-3-906027-70-8
- James Wines, "De-Architecture", Rizzoli International Publications, Inc., New York, 1987, ISBN 0-8478-0861-0.
- Fritz Damerius, "Breitenbrunn", Autorenverlag Gerbergruben, 7100 Neusiedl, 2003, ISBN 3-902119-03-9.
- James Wines, "Grüne Architektur", edited by Philip Jodidio, Taschen Verlag, Köln, London, Paris, New York, ISBN 3-8228-0811-3.
- "Topos" 11, European Landscape Magazine, Verlag Callwey, Munich, June 1995, ISSN 0942-752X. ISBN 3-7667-1188-1.
- "Parnass", Kunstmagazin 03 / 2005, Parnass Verlag, Vienna
- "Interni", La Rivist dell’Arredamento, 462 / Luglio, 1996, Mondadori Pubblicitá, Milan
- "Wohn! Design", Internationales Magazin für Architektur und Design, July / August 2001, Trend Medien Verlag, Stuttgart
- "Archetype", Architecture Magazine, Startling Papers Publishing Partnership; San Francisco CA, Volime I, Summer 1979 Number II
- Peter Noever, "Die Grube, The Pit", exhibition catalog, published by Aedes. Galerie und Architekturforum, Berlin, 1991, ISBN 3-901127-01-1
- Peter Noever, "Upstairs Down", The Pit. The Tower. The Terrace Plateau, Exhibition Catalog, Published by Shirin Neshat and Kyong Park
- StoreFront for Art and Architecture, New York, 1994, ISBN 3-901127-04-6
