= Josef Mikl =

Austrian artist (1929–2008)

- Born: 8 August 1929; Vienna, Austria
- Died: 29 March 2008 (aged 78)
- Known for: Painter, Sculptor, Architecture
- Movement: Informalist

Josef Mikl (August 8, 1929 – March 29, 2008) was an Austrian abstract painter of the Informal style.

== Biography ==
Born in Vienna, he received his first training at the Graphische Lehr- und Versuchsanstalt, studying at the prominent Viennese academy from 1949 to 1956 under Josef Dobrovský. Collaborating with Friedensreich Hundertwasser at the Vienna Art Club, Mikl later was a member of the Galerie St. Stephan group. In 1968 Mikl, well known in Austria, represented his home country at the 34th Biennale in Venice.

Classified as an Informal and Modernist artist, Mikl himself despised his artwork being placed under a specific label, calling it "an insult" in an undated interview. He worked in oil, pastels and water colors, as well as sculptures and drawings that either stood alone or served as illustrations in a book or decorations in a church. Mikl is best known for renovating the Redoutensaal in Vienna's Imperial Palace after it was destroyed in a 1992 fire. The hall once served as a venue for the first performance of Ludwig van Beethoven's 8th Symphony as well as a summit between U.S. President John F. Kennedy and Soviet leader Nikita S. Krushchev and was reopened in 1997 with vibrant reds and yellows depicting notable themes and figures of Austrian literature, all of Mikl's design.

Josef Mikl died of cancer on March 29, 2008. His funeral was held on April 3 though his death was not announced until the next day, in accordance with Mikl's wishes. His survivors include his wife, Brigitte Bruckner, and their 20-year-old daughter Anna Mikl.

== Honours and awards ==
- Award from the City of Vienna (1955)
- City of Vienna Prize for Visual Arts, Painting and Graphics (1973)
- Austrian Decoration for Science and Art (1990)
- Grand Gold Decoration for Services to the Republic of Austria (2004)
- Ring of Honour of Vienna (2004)
