= Rubén Ortiz Torres =

Mexican artist

Rubén Ortiz Torres (born February 27, 1964) is a Mexican photographer, painter, sculptor, film and video producer.

== Biography ==
He was the subject of the mid-career survey show Desmothernismo at the Huntington Beach Art Center, a show which toured to the Museo Universitario de Ciencias y Arte in Mexico City. His low-rider/video installation "Alien Toy" was shown as part of the InSite show in San Diego in 1997 then in 1998 at Track 16 in Los Angeles. He co-directed the feature-length experimental documentary Frontierland with Jesse Lerner in 1995.

Ortiz has been a Faculty Member in the Department of Visual Arts at the University of California, San Diego. Ortiz publishes a blog entitled For The Record. He received his MFA from the California Institute of the Arts in 1992.

"Customization characterizes the art of Rubén Ortiz Torres in almost all media and offers an alternative avenue for approaching the issues of globalization so central to our current 'New World Order' and the various, sometimes conflicted, responses to this newest form of Euro-American dominance." (Chavoya)

Ortiz is noted as "one of the first artists in Mexico to position himself with-in Post-Modernisim." (Debroise p296)

== Works ==
- Alien Toyz(1997/1998)
- Hi n' Lo (2008)

=== Photographic series ===
- MexiPunx
  - Portrait of an Artist as a Young Man
  - La última cena (The Last Supper)
- Apparitions
- Hall of Mirrors
- American Monarchy
- Raza Cósmica
- Adoration of The Magi
- Naturaleza Life Still Muerta
- The Past is not What it Used to Be
  - Apocalipsis Maya

== Education ==
- 1993– Grant, National Council for Culture and Arts, National System for Creators, Mexico City, Mexico.
- 1990-1992- Master in Plastic Arts,California Institute of the Arts, Valencia, CA, USA.
- 1983-1988- Bachelor in Visual Arts, Escuela de Artes Plásticas, UNAM, Mexico City, Mexico.
- 1981– School of Design, Harvard University, Cambridge, MA, USA.

== Film and video ==
- 1986: "La Ciudad Rota" 3/4", Mexico City
- 1991: "How to Read Macho Mouse" 3/4", 8min 21 sec., L.A. Chingadera Productions (produced in collaboration with Aaron Anish), Cal Arts, Valencia, CA
- 1991: "The Fence", 10 min 13 sec., ChiL.A.ngo Productions, Cal Arts, Valencia, CA
- 1992: "Custom Mambo", 3/4" 5 min 13 sec., ChiL.A.ngo Productions, Cal Arts, Valencia, CA
- 1995: "Frontierland" (produced in collaboration with Jesse Lerner) 16mm/Betacam SP, 77min. ITVS, U.S. Mexico Fund for Culture, Banff Center for the Arts
- 1997: "Alien Toy", 3/4" SP, 8 mins., Raza Cosmica Productions, Los Angeles
- 2000: "La Zamba Del Chevy" 3D DVD 5 min. 56 sec., Raza Cósmica Productions, Los Angeles
- 2001: "Spectacle/ Spaztec Aztec Visits the Alamo" (produced in collaboration with Jimmy Mendiola_, 3D, DVD 5 min. 5 sec.
- 2002: "El Bodhisattva" (produced in collaboration with Eduardo Abaroa), DV 5 min. 55 sec. (continuous loop), Calimocho Styles, Los Angeles
- 2003: "Second Generation" (produced in collaboration with Eduardo Abaroa), DV 5 min. 39 sec. (continuous loop), Calimocho Styles, Los Angeles
- 2003: "Backyard Boogie Woogie" Looping DVD, Raza Cósmica Productions, Los Angeles
- 2003: P2-3D (produced in collaboration with Yoshua Okón), 3D DVD, 14 min., Calimocho Styles, Los Angeles
- 2003: "Mapping of the Mascott Genome" (produced in collaboration with Jimmy Mendiola) 2 synched DVDs on vertical Monitors, Bad Ass Pictures, Los Angeles
- 2004: "If Manhattan Doesn't Go to the Mountain ...", DV 60 min. (continuous loop), Raza Cósmica Productions, New York
- 2005: "Manhattan Dub" (with Music by Double Horizontal), DV 6 min. 2 sec., Lo Rez Crimez Productions, New York
- 2006: "The Dream of Reason Still Produces Monsters" DV 13 min. 7 sec., (continuous loop, projected in corner), Raza Cosmica Productions, Los Angeles
- 2012 "Retrospective in a New York Minute" DV 1 minute (continuous loop), Raza Cósmica Productions, Los Angeles

== Books ==
- 1990: Posturas Tes Ensayos Sobre Realismo, Arte e Identidad en Cierto Arte de Fin de Siglo, Universidad Nacional Autóma de México, Mexico City, 90pp.
- 1993: The Big Sweep/La Gran Limpieza (with Steve Callis, Leslie Ernst and Sandra Ramirez), California Classics Books, Los Angeles 64pp.
- 1997: Murder in My Suite/Bienvendos al Hotel California, (with Steve Callis, Leslie Ernst and Sandra Ramirez) John Brown Books, Salem, OR, 64pp.
- 1998: Desmothernismo (with essays by Tyler Stallings and David Green), co-published by Smart Art Press, Santa Monica, CA, Huntington Beach Art Center, Huntington Beach, CA, and Travesísas, Guadalajara Mexico 72pp.

== Public collections ==
- Armand Hammer Museum of Art & Cultural Center – The Grunwald Center for the Graphic Art, Los Angeles
- Brooklyn Museum, Brooklyn
- UCR/California Museum of Photography, Riverside, California
- Carnegie Art Museum, Oxnard, California
- Centro Cultural de la Raza, San Diego
- Centro Cultural de Arte Contemporaneo, Mexico City
- Centro de la Imagen, Mexico City
- Instituto Nacional de Bellas Artes, Mexico City
- Colección Jumex, Mexico City
- Long Beach Museum of Art, Long Beach, California
- Los Angeles County Museum of Art, Los Angeles
- Metropolitan Museum of Art, New York
- National Museum of Mexican Art, Chicago
- Museo de Arte Moderno de Aguascalientes, Aguascalientes, Mexico
- Museo de la Estampa, Mexico City
- Museo Nacional de la Fotografía, Pachuca, Mexico
- Museo Nacional Centro de Arte Reina Sofía, Madrid
- Museum of Contemporary Art, Los Angeles
- Museum of Contemporary Art, San Diego
- Museum of Fine Arts, Houston
- Museum of Modern Art, New York
- New York Public Library, New York
- Spencer Museum of Art, Lawrence, Kansas
- Tate Modern, London
- Video Out, Vancouver
- Williams College, North Adams, MA

== Collaborators ==
- Eduardo Abaroa (Calimocho Styles)
- Aaron Anish (Chingaladeria Productions)
- Dewey Ambrosino (Lo Rez Crimez)
- Steven Callis (The Big Sweep, Murder in My Suite)
- Jesse Lerner (Frontierland)
- Konstantinos Mavromacalis (Lo Rez Crimez)
- Jimmy Mendiola (The A-Files, Bad Ass Pictures)
- Yoshua Okon (P2-3D)
- Francesco Siqueiros (Blood and Oil)
- Jay S. Johnson (Hi n' Lo)

== Awards and grants ==
- 2000– Foundation for Contemporary Performance Arts, New York, USA.
- 1999– Prize, Comfort Tiffany Foundation, New York, USA.
- 1999– Grant, UC Mexus, University of California in San Diego, San Diego, CA, USA.
- 1999– National Fund for Culture and Arts (FONCA), Artes Visuales, Mexico City.
- 1997– Prize, Andrea Frank Foundation, New York, USA.
- 1997– National System of Art Creators, National Council for Culture and Arts, Mexico City.
- 1996– Special mention, Festival Cinematográfico Internacional del Uruguay, Montevideo, Uruguay.
- 1996– Special Jury Prize, Cinefestival, San Antonio, TX, USA.
- 1995– Memory/History Residence Program, The Banff Center for the Arts, Banff, Canada.
- 1993– National System of Art Creators, National Council for Culture and Arts, Mexico City.
- 1993– I.T.V.S., P.B.S. (Grant shared with Jesse Lerner), Saint Paul, MN, USA.
- 1993– US-Mexico Fund for Culture (Prize shared with Jesse Lerner)
- 1990– Fulbright Grant, USA.
- 1987– Salón Nacional de Pintura, Mexico City.
- 1986– Encuentro Nacional de Arte Joven, Aguascalientes, Mexico.
- 1985– Special Prize (shared with Diego Toledo and Emmanuel Lubezki), Sección de Espacios Alternativos, Mexico City.
- 1985– First Prize, Pinturas, BSO, Milan, Italy.
- 1985– Honorable Mention, Cuarto Encuentro Nacional de Arte Joven, Casa de la Cultura de Aguascalientes, Aguascalientes, Mexico, and Palacio de Bellas Artes, Mexico City.
- 1983– First Honorable Mention in Illustration, Punto de Partida, UNAM, Mexico City.
