= Jesse Lerner =

American filmmaker

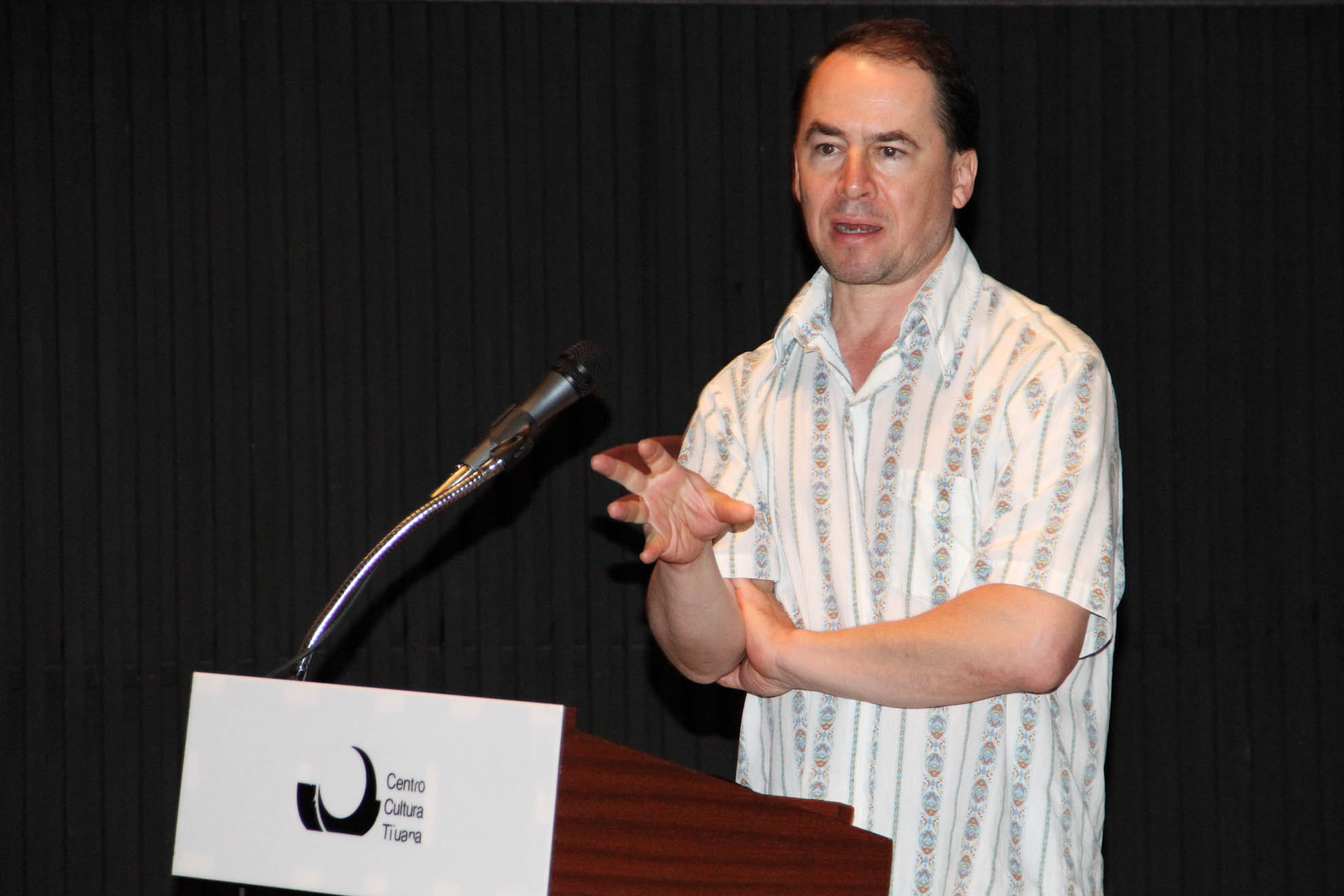
Jesse Lerner in 2013.

Jesse Lerner is a filmmaker and writer based in Los Angeles and Mexico City. His documentaries include Frontierland (with Rubén Ortiz Torres), about the Latino experience in the United States; Ruins (about the history of Mexican archeology and the traffic in fakes), The Atomic Sublime (about Abstract Expressionism and the Cold War), The Absent Stone (with Sandra Rozental, about the monolith of Coatlinchan) and The American Egypt (about the Mexican Revolution in Yucatán).

== Biography ==
Lerner directed the short films Magnavoz, T.S.H., and Natives (with Scott Sterling). His films played at the 2000 Sundance Film Festival, the Museum of Modern Art, the Rotterdam International Film Festival, the Guggenheim Museum in New York, and the Aztlán Today exhibit at the Bronx Museum of the Arts. These films were featured at mid-career surveys at the National Gallery of Art (Washington D.C.), the Cineteca Nacional (Mexico City), Anthology Film Archives (New York City), and the Churubusco Studios (Mexico City).

Lerner books include F is for Phony (with Alexandra Juhasz), a survey of faked documentaries, and The Mexperimental Cinema (with Rita Gonzalez). Two of his publications were associated with film series: Ism Ism Ism (which showed at the Los Angeles Filmforum, the Museo de Arte Moderno Buenos Aires, and the Museo Nacional de Arte Reina Sofía) and The Mexperimental Cinema (screened at Berkeley's Pacific Film Archive, Mexico City's Centro Nacional de las Artes, and the Harvard Film Archive).

Lerner has also curated exhibitions at the National Palace of Fine Arts in Mexico City (Palacio de Bellas Artes), the Schindler House/MAK Center, the Guggenheim Museums (in New York and Bilbao), and the Robert Flaherty Seminar. He has lectured on film and other visual arts at CalArts, Princeton University, the Universidad Autónoma de Yucatán, the Freie Universitat Berlin, the Museo Amparo, University College London, the Getty Museum, the Hammer Museum, Cornell University, the Museo Nacional de Antropología (Mexico City), the Berlin Documentary Forum, and the Universidad Nacional Autónoma de México.

Lerner is the father of Minerva "Minnie" Harris Lerner and son of Ralph Lerner and Carol Lerner.

== Films ==
- The Fragmentations Only Mean ... (2022) Co-director (camera and editor), with Sara Harris Ben-Ari Co-director(sound design and field production) DCP. Color. 72 minutes.
- The Absent Stone (2013) Co-director, camera and editor. 35mm. Color. 82 minutes.
- Atomic Sublime (2010) Director and editor. 16 mm on digital video. B & W and color, 72 minutes. Sound by Sara Harris Ben-Ari.
- Two Very Short Films about Maya Revival Architecture (2009) Director, 16mm, color, 2 minutes.
- Magnavoz (2006) Director, editor and camera. 16 mm B & W. 25 minutes. Sound design by Sara Harris Ben-Ari.
- T.S.H. (2004) Director, editor, camera and sound. 16 mm B & W. 6 minutes.
- The American Egypt (2001) Director, editor and camera. 16 mm B & W and color. 57 minutes.
- Ruins (1999) Director, editor and camera. 16mm B & W, 78 minutes.
- Mexopolis (1997) Co-director and camera, with ADOBE L.A. Super-8 color film, 11 minutes.
- Frontierland/Fronterilandia (1995) Co-director, -editor, -camera and -sound, with Rubén Ortiz Torres. 16 mm, super-8 and high-8 video, B & W and color, 56 minute (broadcast) and 78 minute (film) versions.
- Natives (1991) Co-director, -editor, -camera and -sound, with Scott Sterling. 16mm B & W, 25 minutes. Distributed by Subcine, Third World Newsreel.
- How Many Stars, How Many Stripes? (1990) Co-director, -camera, -editor, and -sound, with Fernando Anguita. 16 mm, B & W, 10 minutes.

== Books ==
- The Catherwood Project (Albuquerque: University of New Mexico Press, 2017).
- Lean-Droka-Tz (Buenos Aires: Fundación Espigas, 2013). With Ana Longoni and Mariano Mestman.
- The Maya of Modernism (Albuquerque: University of New Mexico Press, 2011). Available in Spanish as Los Mayas del modernismo (CDMX.: Siglo XXI, 2019).
- The Shock of Modernity/El impacto de la modernidad (Madrid: Turner, 2007).

=== Co-editor ===
- Co-editor, with Rubén Ortiz Torres, El Fin: Compendio de Lecturas (CDMX: Patronato de Arte Contemporáneo, 2022).
- Co-editor, with Luciano Piazza, Ism Ism Ism: Experimental Film in Latin America (Oakland: University of California Press, 2017).
- Co-editor, with Rubén Ortiz Torres, L.A. Collects L.A.: Latin America in Southern California Collections (Berlin: Bom Dia, Boa Tarde, Boa Noite, 2017).
- Co-editor, with Rubén Ortiz Torres, How to Read Pato Pascual: Disney’s Latin America and Latin America’s Disney (London: Black Dog, 2017).
- Co-editor, with Holly Willis, More Than Meets the Eye: The Videos of Tran T. Kim-Trang (Los Angeles: Scalar, 2016).
- Co-editor, with Alexandra Juhasz, F is for Phony: Fake Documentary and Truth’s Undoing (Minneapolis: University of Minnesota Press, 2006).
