= Peter Noever =

Austrian designer (born 1941)

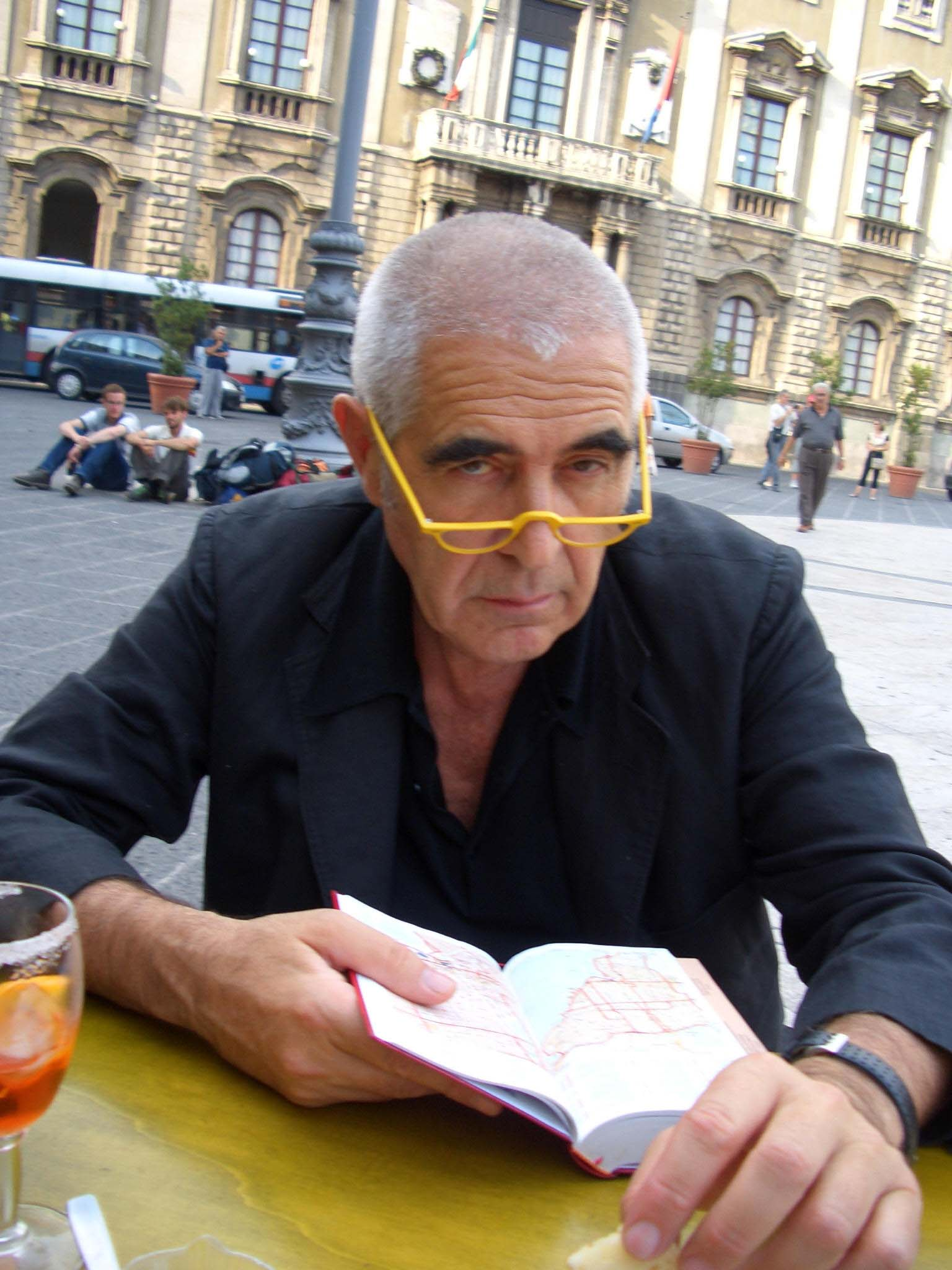
- Noever in 2005
- Born: Peter Noever; 1941 (age 84–85); Innsbruck, Ostmark, Nazi Germany
- Notable work: The Pit (Breitenbrunn am Neusiedlersee, Austria)
- Spouse: Katarina Noever
- Awards: Museum of the Year Award of the Council of Europe; 1996; Kurie für Kunst und Wissenschaft; 1997; Golden Decoration of Honour for Services to the Republic of Austria; 2010
- Website: www.noever-design.com

Peter Noever (born 1941) is an Austrian designer and curator-at-large of art, architecture and media. From 1986 to 2011, he was the artistic director and chief executive officer of the Austrian Museum of Applied Arts and Contemporary Art (MAK) in Vienna.

== Career ==
In 1971, Peter and Katarina Noever co-founded a concept store in Vienna, called "Section N". The building was designed by Hans Hollein. From 1975 to 1993, Noever worked as a lecturer of design analysis at the Academy of Fine Arts Vienna. Starting in the early 1990s, Noever was the editor-in=chief of the architecture magazine titled UMRISS (Outline).

Between 1986 and 2011, Noever was the CEO and artistic director of the Austrian Museum for Applied Arts/Contemporary Art, Vienna (MAK). In 1994, Noever acquired and renovated the Schindler House in West Hollywood. There he founded the MAK Center for Art and Architecture, which hosts artists in residence and serves as a gallery space. The activities of the MAK Center in Los Angeles take place at three locations, all buildings designed by the Austrian-American architect Rudolph M. Schindler (1887–1953).

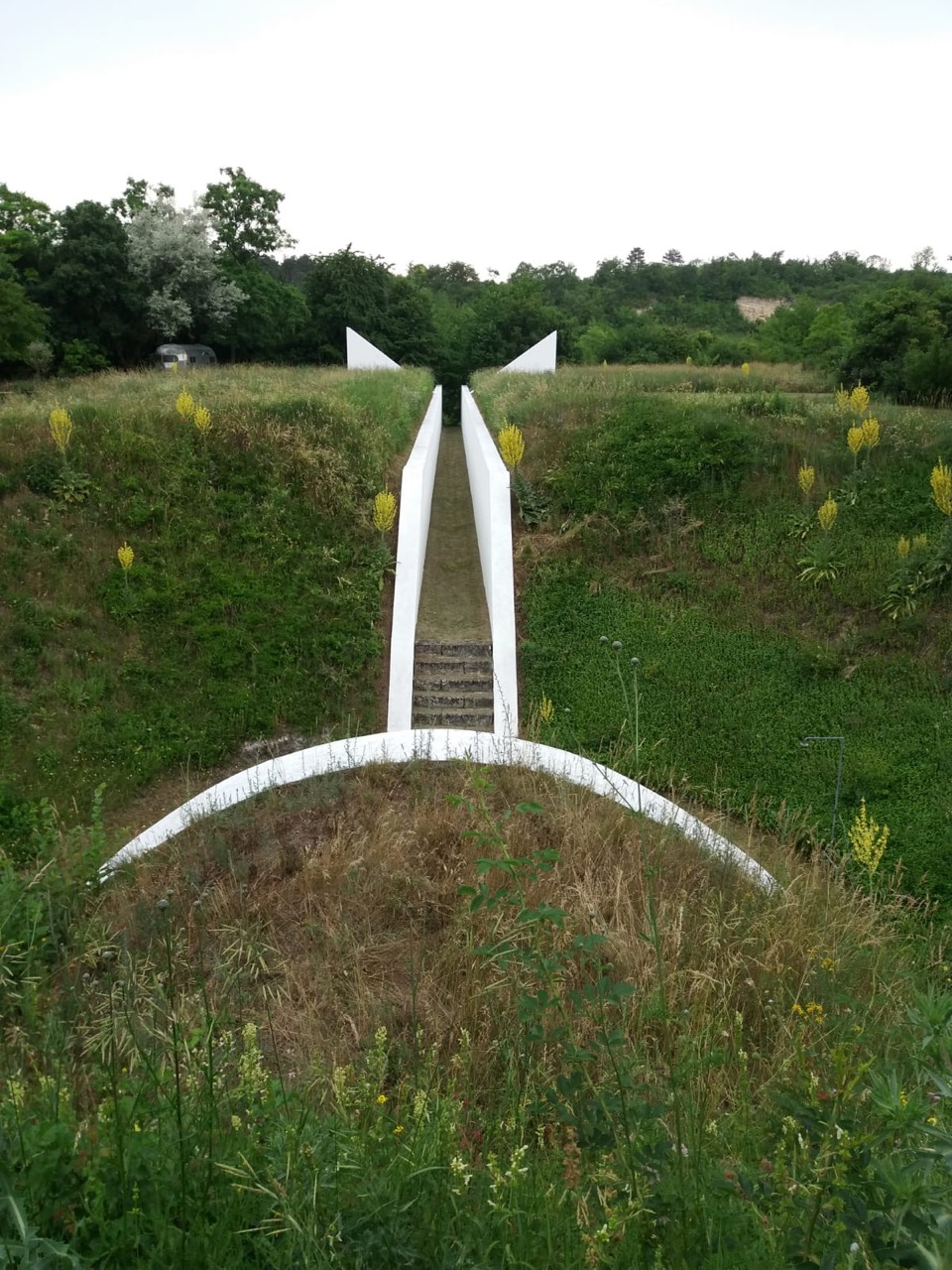
“The Pit” land art project in Austria

As a curator and exhibition designer, Noever has organized over 300 exhibitions, in Berlin, Budapest, Havana, Los Angeles, Moscow, New York, Prague, Shenzhen, St. Petersburg, Venice, Vienna, Tokyo, and other international cities.

== Art works ==
Noever designed the land art project, The Pit ("Die Grube" in German) located on Lake Neusiedl in Breitenbrunn am Neusiedlersee, Austria. The work was built in the early 1970s; in 2019 the Austrian Federal Office BDA placed it under monument protection.

In 1994, Noever had a one person show at the Storefront for Art and Architecture, titled Upstairs Down: The Pit, The Tower, The Terrace Plateau by Peter Noever.

== Writing ==
Noever has authored and edited many books, including Softspace: From a Representation of Form to a Simulation of Space; Yearning for Beauty: The Wiener Werkstätte and the Stoclet House; and others.

== Awards and honors ==
In 1996, Noever received the Museum of the Year Award of the Council of Europe (for the MAK). In 1997, he received the "Kurie für Kunst und Wissenschaft", an award for science and arts in Austria. In 2010 he was awarded with the Golden Decoration of Honour for Services to the Republic of Austria.

== Controversy ==
In February 2011, Noever resigned as director of MAK due to findings related to museum funding and spending, including using funds for a birthday party for his mother during which damage to the museum in Vienna occurred. This also impacted MAK Los Angeles. Noever issued an apology, and helped to pay for the damages. He was thanked by several people in the art world for his 25 years of service. His position was then filled by the acting director, Martina Kandeler-Fritsch, and in September, 2011, Christoph Thun-Hohenstein became the director of MAK.
