= Franz von Zülow =

Austrian graphic artist and painter

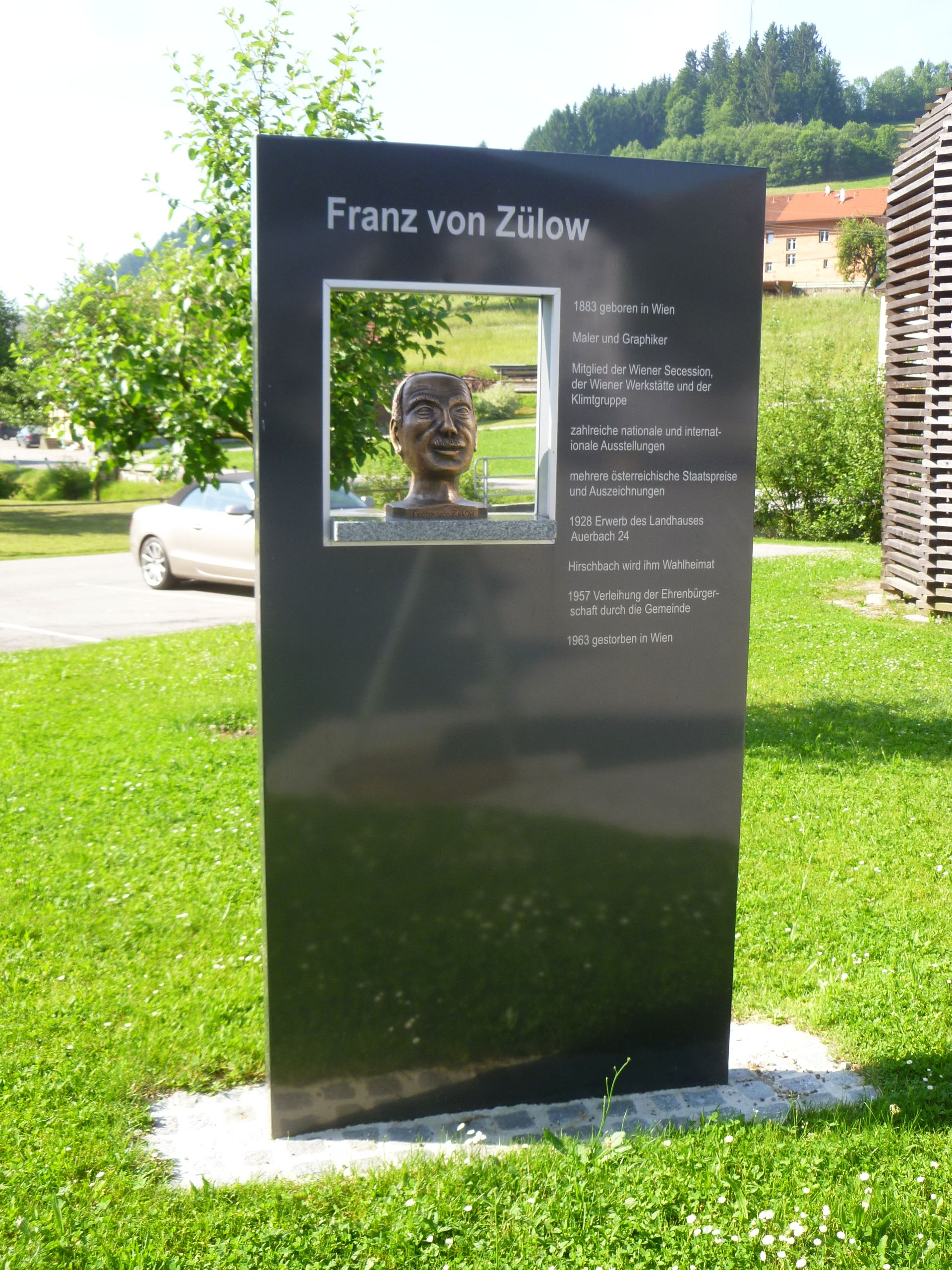
A monument to Franz von Zülow in Hirschbach

Franz von Zülow (15 March 1883 – 26 February 1963) was an Austrian graphic artist and painter whose experimentation resulted in several new printing and design methods. He was a member of the Vienna Secession, the Wiener Werkstatte, and the Zinkerbach Artist Colony. He is the brother of the ceramicist Maria von Zülow and the father of the architect and painter Franz Joachim Zülow.

== Early life and education ==
Franz von Zülow was born in Vienna, Austria. His father was from a noble family in Mecklenburg and his mother was the child of a wine-grower. Zülow began attending formal art training in 1901 at the Graphische Lehr- und Versuchsanstalt (Graphic School in Vienna), where he studied under Joseph Eugen Horwater and Hubert Landa. His success led him to be a guest student at the Academy of Fine Art in Vienna under Christian Griepenkerl where he stayed until 1903. From 1903 until 1906 Zülow attended the Vienna College of Applied Art. His teachers include Felician von Myrbach, Kolo Moser and Carl Czeschka. Artist Oskar Kokoschka was in his class. In 1907, at age 24, Zülow was awarded his first patent, for a stencil-printing technique which he had developed.

In 1908 he participated in the Wiener Kunstschau, an art exhibition put on by the Klimt Group led by Gustav Klimt, whom he had made acquaintances with that year. Klimt and his associates were intent on challenging the contemporary ideas and institutions of art in Austria and their work pushed boundaries that often led to public outcry, their removal from public spaces, or the artists being pushed out of respectable institutions. Klimt and his peers, including Zülow, sought new spaces to publicly showcase unconventional works.

In 1912 he was awarded the Prince Liechtenstein travel award used it to tour Germany, France, England and the Netherlands. He continued to experiment with different styles and techniques until 1915, when he was called up to military service for the First World War. He was stationed in Hungary, Albania, and eventually Italy, where he was captured.

== Career ==
In 1919 Zülow returned from captivity in Italy and resumed his career, working at the Weiner Werkstatte, creating metal designs, wallpapers, calendars and illustrations. The next few year saw him experiment, as well as teach, with ceramics, oil and paste paintings, and graphic design.

In 1922 Zülow married Thusnelda Opitz, and they moved into his studio in the Porzellangasse, Vienna. They had one son, the architect and painter Franz Joachim Zülow. Zulow continued working, winning awards, and traveling. In 1925, Zülow was awarded a gold medal at an applied art exhibition in Paris as well as the Austrian Banknote Prize. These funded two subsequent trips to Italy where he studied techniques in oil painting. In 1928 he won the Austrian State Prize which subsidized his travels to North Africa. He created his first commissioned works and the proceeds enabled him to purchase a house in Hirschbach, Upper Austria. From then he and his wife would split their time between Hirschbach and Vienna. It is likely that around this time he began meeting with the Zinkebach Artist Colony, which had informally begun the year before. In 1931 he was awarded the Julius Reich Foundation prize. From 1933-39 he was a member of the Vienna Secession. After the Anschluss, in which Austria was subsumed into the German Nazi Regime, the Secession was closed and its building destroyed as a symbol of decadent art and culture which the Nazi's sought to destroy. In 1943 Zülow was banned from painting by the Nazi Regime.

After the war, started a firm Augarten in Vienna that specialized in ceramics. In 1949 Zülow taught at the Art College in Linz where he was eventually given the title of honorary professor. He also was made honorary member and president of the Muhlviertel artist’s guild. In 1958 he was made an honorary member of the Vienna Secession.

He died in Vienna in 1963.
