= Ernst Huber (painter) =

Austrian painter

- Born: 15 July 1895; Vienna, Austria-Hungary
- Died: 26 September 1960 (aged 65); Vienna, Austria
- Occupation: Painter

Ernst Huber (15 July 1895 – 26 September 1960) was an Austrian painter. His work was part of the painting event in the art competition at the 1928 Summer Olympics.
