= Ferdinand Kitt =

Austrian painter

- Born: 22 November 1887; Vienna, Austria-Hungary
- Died: 5 February 1961 (aged 73); Vienna, Austria
- Occupation: Painter

Ferdinand Kitt (22 November 1887 – 5 February 1961) was an Austrian painter. His work was part of the art competitions at the 1928 Summer Olympics and the 1936 Summer Olympics.
