= Gloria Sutton =

American contemporary art historian

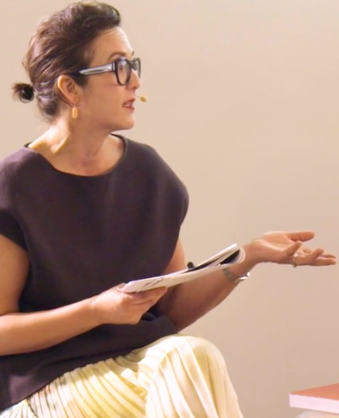
Gloria Hwang Sutton lecturing at Northeastern University

Gloria Sutton is an American art historian, critic, and curator. She is known for her scholarship on contemporary art, media theory, and exhibition histories, particularly the intersection of art and technology. Sutton is an Associate Professor of Contemporary Art History and New Media at Northeastern University and a Research Affiliate in the Art Culture Technology Program at the Massachusetts Institute of Technology (MIT).

== Academic and professional career ==
Sutton is an Associate Professor of Contemporary Art History and Women, Gender, and Sexuality Studies at Northeastern University. She is also a Research Affiliate in the Art, Culture, and Technology (ACT) program at the Massachusetts Institute of Technology (MIT).

She serves on the advisory committees of the MIT List Visual Arts Center, Voices in Contemporary Art (VoCA), and Boston Art Review, and is on the editorial boards of Signs: Journal of Women in Culture and Society and Bloomsbury’s International Texts in Critical Media Aesthetics series. Her research has been supported by institutions such as the Andy Warhol Foundation and the Getty Research Institute.

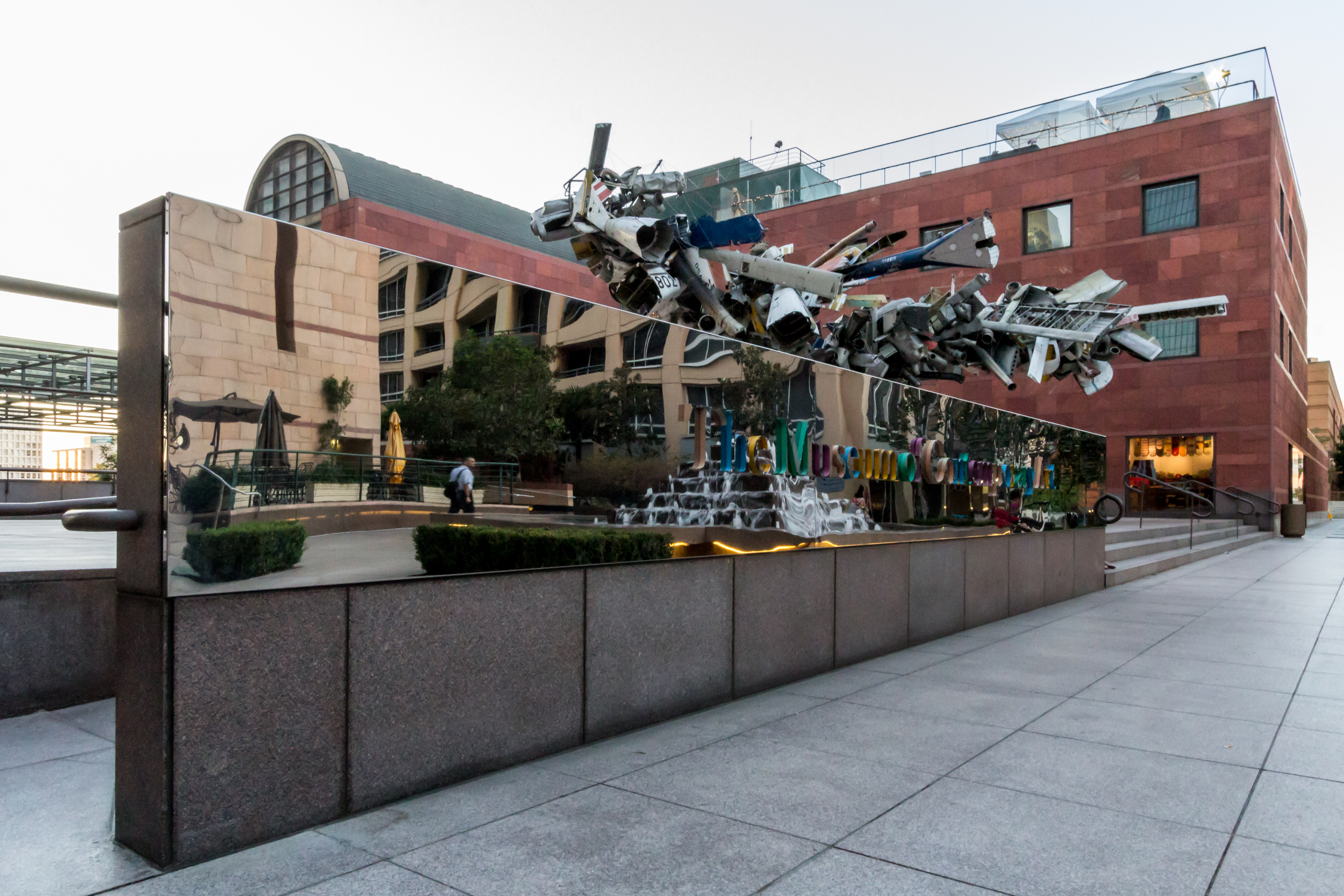
The Museum of Contemporary Art, Los Angeles

From 1997 to 2002, Sutton served on the advisory board of Rhizome, a pioneering nonprofit for born-digital art, helping to develop foundational frameworks for exhibiting, archiving, and theorizing internet-based practices.

Her editorial career began at Afterimage, where she focused on the underrepresentation of minority voices in art criticism. She later became the inaugural editor of Art Journal Open, where she expanded the role of digital scholarship and public engagement in contemporary art history. Sutton co-curated the large-scale urban art exhibition in Los Angeles titled How Many Billboards? Art In Stead, organized by the MAK Center. She has also held curatorial roles at the Museum of Contemporary Art, Los Angeles.

Her first book, The Experience Machine: Stan VanDerBeek’s Movie-Drome and Expanded Cinema (MIT Press), was the first comprehensive study of VanDerBeek’s multimedia work and was translated into French in 2023, with a foreword by Olafur Eliasson.

She has collaborated with artists including Jennifer Bornstein, Anna Craycroft, and Sara VanDerBeek, editing the first monograph on the latter. From 2016 to 2018, she worked with Renée Green on exhibitions and programming at Harvard’s Carpenter Center, culminating in the publication of Renée Green: Pacing (D.A.P., 2021).

== Radical Softness: The Responsive Art of Janet Echelman ==
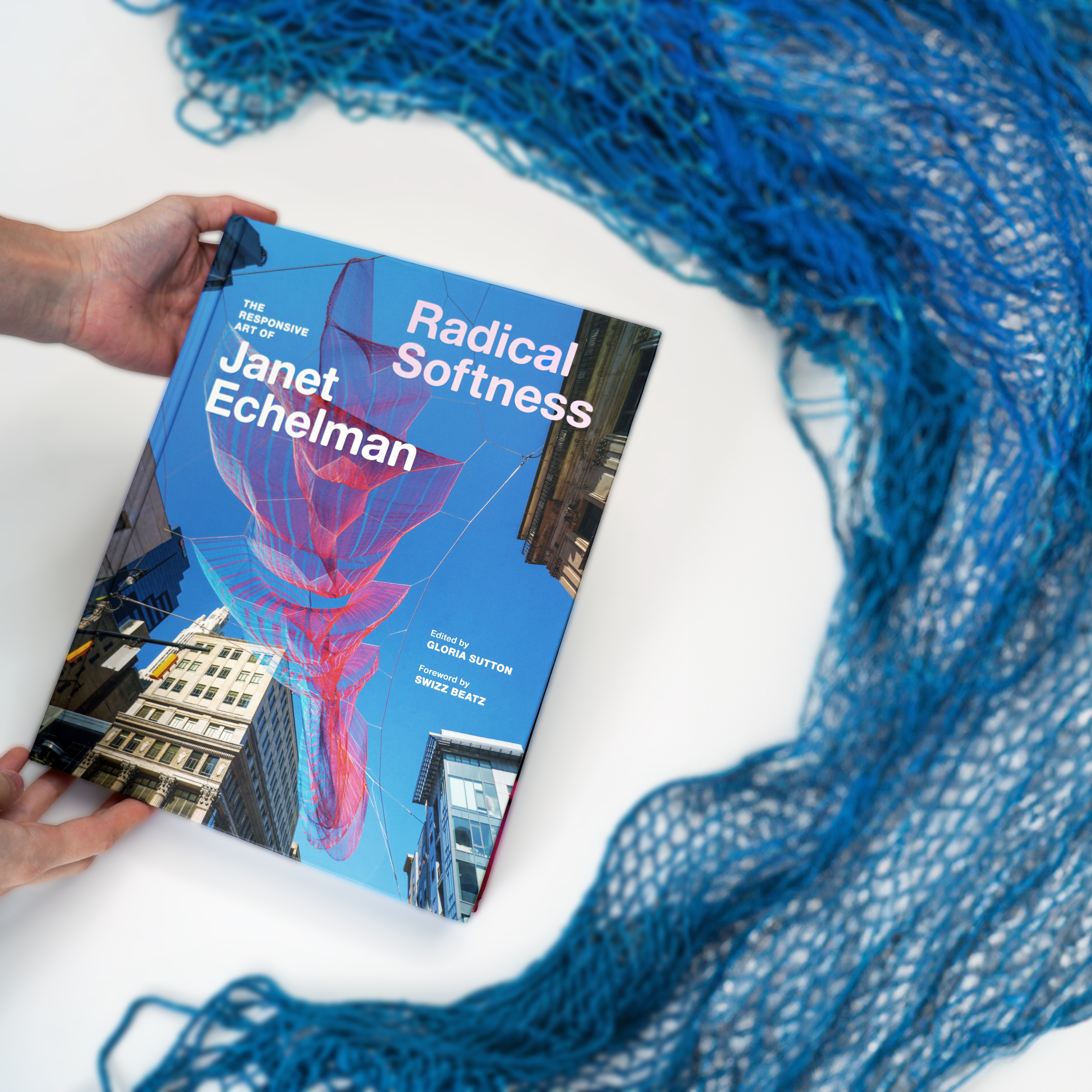
Radical Softness: The Responsive Art of Janet Echelman

Sutton is the editor of Radical Softness: The Responsive Art of Janet Echelman (2025), the first scholarly monograph on Echelman’s large-scale, responsive sculptures. The volume features critical essays, archival materials, and full-color documentation exploring the artist’s interdisciplinary practice and the aesthetics of softness in public space.

== Publications and Critical Contributions ==
Sutton’s writing has appeared in numerous landmark museum catalogues and scholarly publications, including:

- Shigeko Kubota: Liquid Reality (MoMA)
- Shigeko Kubota: A Matter of Memory: Shigeko Kubota’s Video Sculptures (MoMA)
- Barbara T. Smith: The Way to Be (ICA LA)
- Bruce Nauman: Neons, Corridors, Rooms (Hangar Bicocca)
- Yayoi Kusama: Infinity Mirrors (Hirshhorn Museum)
- Art in the Age of the Internet: 1989 to Today (ICA Boston)
- Julia Scher: Maximum Security Society (Museum Abteiberg/DISTANZ)
- Katalin Ladik: Ooooooooo-pus (Haus der Kunst)
- Steina: Playback (Buffalo AKG Art Museum and MIT List Visual Arts Center)

Sutton's teaching, writing, and curatorial work advocate for feminist infrastructures, collective authorship, and the recognition of underappreciated cultural labor. She is a frequent speaker at cultural institutions globally.

== Education ==
Sutton earned her BA from the University of North Carolina at Chapel Hill and completed the Whitney Independent Study Program. She received her PhD from the University of California, Los Angeles (UCLA).

== Selected public talks ==
- Max Wasserman Forum: "Another World" (April 2021, MIT List Visual Arts Center) Participated in panel discussions "What are we Building?" and "What are the Barriers?" alongside Hito Steyerl.
- In Conversation: Gloria Sutton & Nancy Valladares (April 5, 2025, ICA Philadelphia)
- The Contemporary Austin – “In Conversation: Gloria Sutton, Josh Kline & Alex Klein” (November 13, 2024) Discussion in conjunction with the Carl Cheng: Nature Never Loses exhibition.

== Bibliography ==
=== Books ===
- The Experience Machine: Stan VanDerBeek’s Movie-Drome and Expanded Cinema, MIT Press, 2015.

=== Book Chapters and Essays ===
- “Image as Action: Vienna Actionism and the Photographic Impulse.” Rite of Passage: The Early Years of Vienna Actionism 1960–1966. Snoeck Verlag, 2014, pp. 95–108.
- “Remarks on the Writings of Renée Green.” In Other Planes of There: The Writings of Renée Green, Duke University Press, 2014, pp. 19–34.
- “Intentional Communities.” In Leap Before You Look: Black Mountain College 1933–1957, Yale University Press, 2015, pp. 370–374.
- “The Principle of Self-Organization in the Work of Rosa Barba.” In Rosa Barba: The Color Out of Space, MIT List Center for Visual Arts, 2016, pp. 68–89.
- “Reception Theory: Difficulties, Dropouts and Interference in the Moving Image Work of Pipilotti Rist.” In Pipilotti Rist, Phaidon, 2016, pp. 94–133.
- “Generative Paradoxes.” In Leaving Skull City: Selected Writings on Art by Michael Corris, Les presses du réel, 2016, pp. 11–14.
- “Between Enactment and Depiction: Yayoi Kusama.” In Yayoi Kusama: Infinity Mirrors, Hirshhorn Museum and Prestel, 2017, pp. 138–155.
- “The Human-Machine Interface: Feedback Experiments of the 1960s–70s.” In 3D: Double Vision, LACMA and Prestel, 2018, pp. 134–141.
- “CTRL ALT DEL: The Problematics of Post Internet Art.” In Art in the Age of the Internet, Yale University Press, 2018, pp. 58–65.
- “Reciprocal Experience.” In Bruce Nauman: A Contemporary, Schaulager, 2018, pp. 87–120.
- “One to One: Commensurability and Difference.” In Jennifer Bornstein: Prints, Sternberg Press, 2018, pp. 146–157.
- “Forms of Organized Complexity: Notes on Renée Green’s Pacing.” Carpenter Center for the Visual Arts, 2018.
- “Elaine Summers’s Intermedia.” In Judson Dance Theater: The Work Is Never Done, Museum of Modern Art, 2018, pp. 82–88.
- “Hans Haacke: Works of Art, 1963–72.” In Hans Haacke: All Connected, Phaidon.
- “Algorithmic Behavior.” In Rafael Lozano-Hemmer: Unstable Presence, SFMoMA, Musée d’art contemporain de Montréal, Museo de Arte Contemporáneo de Monterrey, and Prestel, 2020, pp. 62–73.
- “Acts of Dispersion in Renée Green’s Within Living Memory.” In Renée Green: Pacing, Carpenter Center for the Visual Arts, Harvard University, 2020, pp. 271–284.
- “My Stakes Are Not Your Stakes: Working at the Margins of Contemporary Art History and Media Art.” In Storytellers of Art History, edited by Alpesh Kantilal Patel and Yasmeen Siddiqui, Intellect Publishers, 2021.
- “The Politics of Breath: Reanimating the Air Art of Hans Haacke and Lygia Clark.” In Atem/Breath: Morphological, Ecological and Social Dimensions, De Gruyter, 2022.

=== Reviews of The Experience Machine: Stan VanDerBeek’s Movie-Drome and Expanded Cinema ===
- Johanna Gosse, “A Machine in the Garden,” Oxford Art Journal, 2018.
- Michael Corris, “Not Virtual,” Art History, Spring 2017.
- Craig J. Saper, “The Other/ness Media Machine,” Rhizomes, 2017.
- Stephen Petersen, “The Experience Machine,” Leonardo Reviews, 2016.
- A.S. Hamrah, “The Experience Machine,” Cineaste Magazine, Fall 2015.
