= How Many Billboards? Art Instead =

How Many Billboards? Art Instead, was a large scale urban art exhibition in Los Angeles, California. The 2010 exhibition concurrently displayed 21 unique billboards created by various leading contemporary Californian artists.

Organized by MAK Center director Kimberli Meyer and co-curated by Nizan Shaked, Dr. Gloria Sutton and Lisa Henry, the exhibition asked artists "to create a new work that critically responded to the medium of the billboard and interpreted its role in the urban landscape". Contemporary artist Martha Rosler and Josh Neufeld were among the commissioned artists.

== Organizer's Statement ==
The philosophical proposition of the exhibition is simple: art should occupy a visible position in the cacophony of mediated images in the city, and it should do so without merely adding to the visual noise. How Many Billboards? Art In Stead proposes that art periodically displace advertisement in the urban environment. Billboards are a dominant feature of the landscape in Los Angeles. Thousands line the city's thoroughfares, delivering high-end commercial messages to a repeat audience. Given outdoor advertising's strong presence in public space, it seems reasonable and exciting to set up the possibility for art to be present in this field. The sudden existence of artistic speech mixed in with commercial speech provides a refreshing change of pace. Commercial messaging tells you to buy; artistic messaging encourages you to look and to think.

— MAK Center Director, Kimberli Meyer

== Participating Artists ==
- Kenneth Anger
- Michael Asher
- Jennifer Bornstein
- Eileen Cowin
- Christina Fernandez
- Ken Gonzales-Day
- Renée Green
- Kira Lynn Harris
- John Knight
- David Lamelas
- Brandon Lattu
- Daniel Joseph Martinez
- Kori Newkirk
- Yvonne Rainer
- Martha Rosler with Josh Neufeld
- Allen Ruppersberg
- Allan Sekula
- Susan Silton
- Kerry Tribe
- James Welling
- Lauren Woods
