= Pixelwald =

2016 multimedia installation by Pipilotti Rist

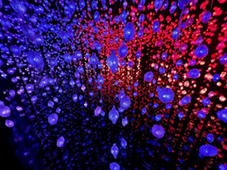
Pixelwald

Pixelwald, english title Pixel Forest, is an audio-video installation by Swiss artist Pipilotti Rist from 2016.

== Description ==
Pixelwald is a video and light installation with around 3000 individually controllable LED elements in the colors pink, blue, red, orange, green and darker shades of crimson, magenta and brown. These are hung from the ceiling on cables reminiscent of lianas. As the LEDs can be controlled individually, the thus created forest is constantly changing its color. In the center of the installation, the audience recognizes a coloured flashing and glowing, individual pixels. The image is fragmented; only from a very great distance would the eye assemble the pixels in an overall view into a coherent piece of art. In a conversation with Bice Curiger, Rist called the work "the ironic idea of a monitor exploding in a room". The video has a duration of 35 minutes.

== Technical specifications ==
Rist developed the installation together with lighting designer Kaori Kuwabara. The pixel forest consists of 3000 tiny light-emitting diodes with a polycarbonate shell, each of which can be controlled individually by a video signal. In this way the lights create a fragmented but recognizable video image. At a distance of at least 200 meters away it would be possible to recognize a blurred shape.

Commercially available LEDs were unable to meet the artist's complex requirements. Schnick-Schnack-Systems in Cologne therefore developed a dot with powerful 360° RGB LEDs for the installation, which can be lined up freely at variable distances. For the premiere at Kunsthaus Zürich in 2016, 332 LED chains with more than 2600 dots were installed. Over 2300 PCB cables of various lengths (300 mm, 500 mm and 800 mm) were installed. 22 System Power Supplies 4E and 84 Wago adapter boards were used for power supply, the dots were controlled over a pixel gate.

== Art historical classification and interpretation ==
Rist stated once Pixelwald would show how human synapses work. As often in her work, the inside would be turned outwards. Her videos were an attempt to create an experience of how people feel. The free hanging pixels would resemble the oxygen bubbles emitted by seaweed, but would also bring into harmony the different types of light we are confronted with daily, for example the different variants of sunlight and artificial light. The audience should be able to walk through the pixels as if they were moving through a brain.

With this video, according to Bice Curiger, Rist created a symbol of our existence, which moves between enchantment and loss. Here, Rist once again would follow her artistic line of using new technologies in her work. Gloria Sutton sees references to Yayoi Kusama's infinite mirrored rooms. In Pixelwald, buildings would be used as producers of artificial nature. The LED light strands would be clearly visible and a manifestation of Rist's artistic line of creating breathtaking effects with ubiquitous materials.

== Collections and museums ==
Pixelwald (Pixel Forest) premiered at Kunsthaus Zürich in 2016 in a retrospective of the artist called Dein Speichel ist mein Taucheranzug im Ozean des Schmerzes (Your Saliva is My Diving Suit in an Ocean of Pain). A year later, in 2017, a retrospective at the New Museum in New York included the installation as well.
