= Chance Operations (disambiguation) =

Chance Operations is a subsidiary of Chance Industries.

Chance Operations or chance operations may also refer to:

- Chance operations, the generation of aleatoric music, independent of the composer's will

== See also ==
- Some Chance Operations, an essay-film by Renée Green, about Italian filmmaker Elvira Notari
