= Pickelporno =

1992 multimedia installation by Pipilotti Rist

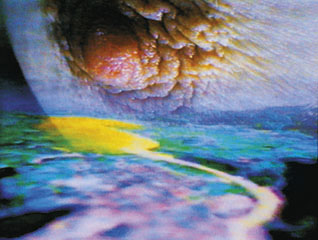
- Pickelporno (film still)
- Directed by: Pipilotti Rist
- Written by: Pipilotti Rist
- Produced by: Pipilotti Rist; Videoladen Zurich
- Starring: Judith Bürgin; Sai Kijima
- Cinematography: Käthe Walser, Pipilotti Rist, Samir
- Edited by: Pipilotti Rist, Ronnie Wahli
- Music by: Peter Bräker; Les Reines Prochaines; Pipilotti Rist
- Distributed by: Megaherz Zürich
- Release date: 1992
- Running time: 12.02 minutes
- Country: Switzerland
- Language: German

Pickelporno, english title Pimple Porn, is an audio-video installation by Swiss artist Pipilotti Rist from 1992.

== Description ==
A (white) woman's feet (Judith Bürgin) in elegant silver strap shoes with high heels are pictured balancing over a grid, while a female voice is singing to the simple sounds of an accordion: ″Mein kleiner Junge / Jetzt komm ich heim / Sei dann mein″ (My little boy / Now I′m coming home / So be mine). She is wearing a spring green shining and flowing, near ankle-length dress. A man′s back in a blue tailcoat and white pants is shown (Sai Kijima). He turns around and spins in slow-motion, he has asian features. The two greet each other in a playful mock-asian way with a bow and palms folded at chest-height. Then they shake hands and touch each others noses with their index fingers while turning. The movements appear to be part of a light child-like dance choreography. The man is presenting a flower in his hand, which is thrown on a freshly made bed by a playful push of her hand, his body following her indication. While he is falling on his back, she falls forward with her body. They start caressing each other.

The style of the video changes: The physical approach and union of the couple is depicted in an experimental way: Eyes, toes, fingers, breasts, penises, vulvae and pubic hair take on huge dimensions. Colourful flowers appear again and again, interrupted by extreme close-ups. Macro shots of intimate body regions alternate with dissociated plant elements, nature shots and psychedelic images: Clouds and stones are shown, birds gliding over the bodies. The movements appear to be under water accompanied by the splashing sound of water. A jellyfish appears and gradually more and more elements of an underwater world emerge. The music takes up speed, moaning can be heard. A breathless voice says, ″Ich mach's dir bunt, ich leck dich wund″ (I'll do you colorfully, I'll lick you sore). The sound captivates the viewers, seducing them with sighs, breathing noises and murmurs and enhancing the intimacy of the viewing experience. The film music seems to drive the climax of the images to a concluding point. The climax is followed by silence, a white screen and calm piano sounds accompanied by a female voice just producing sounds without text over the altered video images of a calmly flowing river.

== Production details ==
The video was shot with a Betacam SP camcorder. Rist worked with a fisheye lens and digital post-production editing to allow the viewer to closely experience human skin, hair and body cavities. The intense coloring and unusual filming angles contribute to the visualisation of physical arousal. Rist stated that she used a so-called ″lipstick camera″ with a very small lens since it allowed her to get very close to the skin without throwing shadows. The camera was built for surveillance and is characterized by its very wide angle and great depth of focus.

The original score was created by Peter Bräker, Pipilotti Rist and Les Reines Prochaines. The studio was equipped with a Fostex 8-track tape recorder (one track used as a timecode track for synchronization), an Atari computer and a Casio FZ-1 keyboard sampler. It was used to transpose, play backwards and loop parts of music and to distort guitar sounds, voice and vocal recordings and noises (water, bird calls). The close-up sounds of the soundtrack correspond with the macro shots of the film.

Pipilotti Rist and Videoladen Zurich were responsible for production.

== Classification and interpretation ==
″Instead of showing a polarizing of the sexes and a mechanical sexual act, the artist depicts a kaleidoscopic chronicle of an ecstatic carnal experience in which the borders of the two bodies disappear and the gaze, both of the viewer and of the performers, merges with the image shown.″ Rist pointed out that camera and body are on the same level in the video: the camera does not objectify the body. It does not have a predetermined, permanent position but is part of the action. If not before, at this point the latest fluidity becomes a fundamental artistic principle of Rist′s work. According to Laura Leuzzi, the fluidity added in post-production prevents the body from becoming an object. Here, as well as in her earlier work I'm Not the Girl Who Misses Much (1986), Rist avoids fetishizing the female body, according to Leuzzi.

The title of the installation implies a fundamental difference to mainstream pornography: In Rist's work the woman is selfconsciously aware and in power of her sexuality and her pleasure which she shares with her partner. Rist stated that she assumed that women were more interested in the feelings and thoughts of the other person during sex than in the observable act. That's why she intended to create a ″porn movie from the inside″. In Rist's view, Pickelporno is her only attempt at the creation of explicitly erotic images.

According to Juliana Engbert, several art historical references can be found in Pickelporno: In one scene, a small globe can be seen on the performer's pubic mound, possibly an allusion to Gustave Courbet's painting The Origin of the World. The performer is shown several times in green panties which could be read as a modern version of the biblical fig leaf. The natural elements, fruits and flowers omnipresent in the video, are not meant to be symbols for intimate body parts but merge and interact with them in a paradise-like world. Elizabeth Mangini thinks, the interaction was showing the inherent connection between the female body and natural processes. Art and cultural history were, according to Mangini, hence not just quoted but ironically refracted in order to show a different understanding of the female body. Andreas Schlaegel identifies references to erotic thrillers of the late 1980s in the opening sequence of the video.

== Screenings and Collections ==
Pickelporno was part of the official selection at the 1992 Locarno Film Festival. The video was part of exhibitions as well as screened on Swiss television's nightly experimental film program. Massimiliano Gioni stated in an interview with Pipilotti Rist that Pickelporno and Sip My Ocean had also attracted attention outside of the art world.

Pickelporno is part of the collections of the ZKM Center for Art and Media Karlsruhe, the media art collection of the Goetz Collection in Munich, and of the Julia Stoschek Foundation.
