= Monochrome Rose =

2016 mobile art installation in urban space by Pipilotti Rist

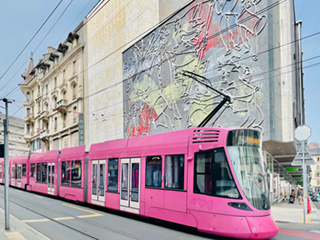
Monochrome Rose Tram (2016)

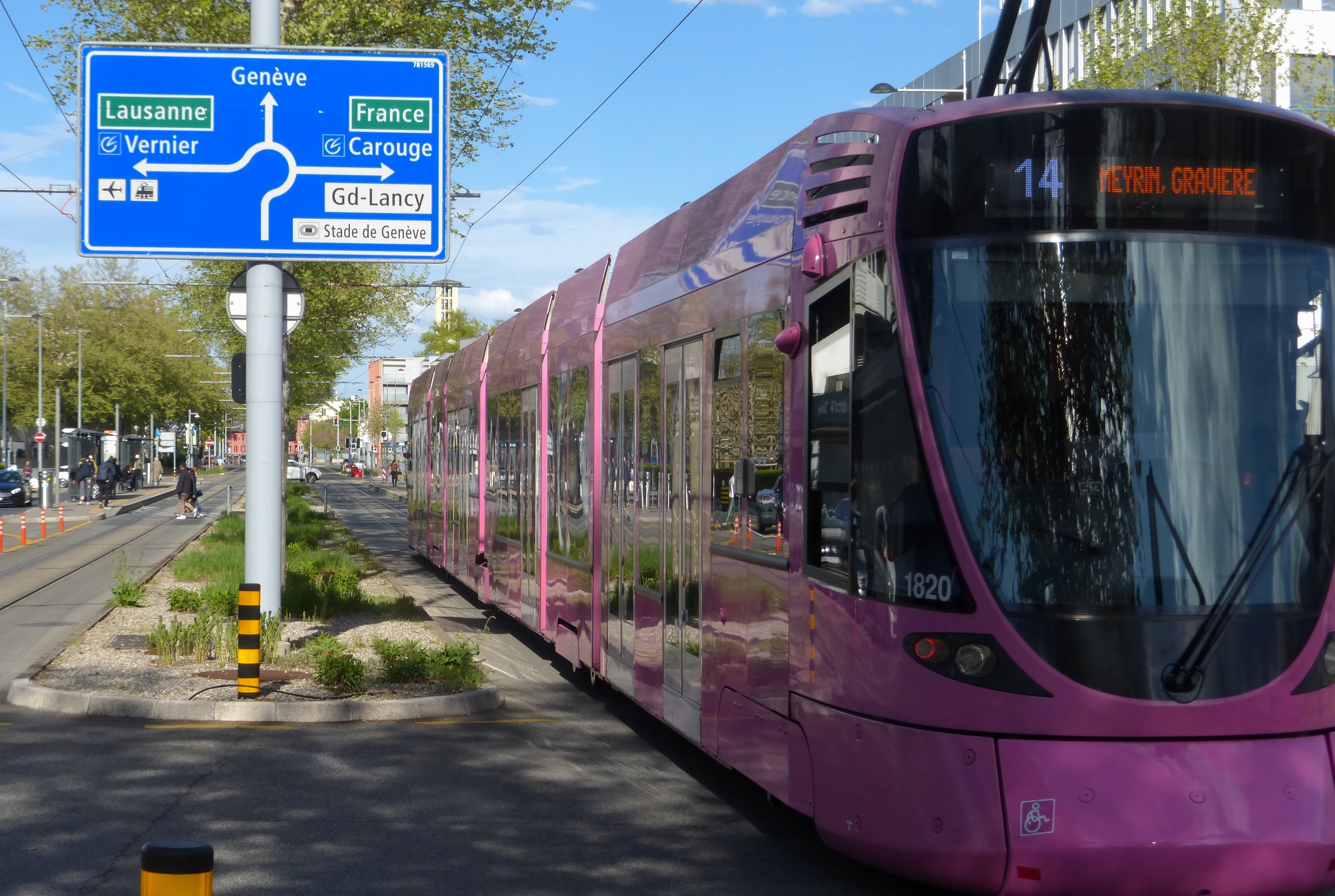
Monochrome Rose Tram (2025)

Monochrome Rose is a mobile art installation in urban space by Swiss artist Pipilotti Rist from 2016.

== Description ==
Monochrome Rose is a tram railcar produced by Stadler Rail and designed by the artist Pipilotti Rist in 2016. The color on the interior and exterior is a bright pink. Exceptions were made for the exterior of the doorframes, since these need to be clearly recognizable for visually impaired persons due to the Disability Discrimination Act in Switzerland. 250 kg of paint were used to coat the vehicle.

The railcar runs regularly on Line 14 of the Geneva public transport company Transports publics genevois (TPG) between the four Geneva municipalities of Lancy, Onex, Confignon and Bernex. The striking pink vehicle thus leaves a transitory surprise effect in the public sphere. The vehicle, which is reminiscent of the monochrome paintings of Kazimir Malevich or Yves Klein, on operation temporarily influences public urban spaces during its journey.

== History ==
In 2009, the four Geneva municipalities of Lancy, Onex, Confignon and Bernex launched the art & tram art project under the responsibility of the Fonds Cantonal d'Art Contemporain. It included a display of works by renowned artists such as Silvie Defraoui, John M. Armleder, Eric Hattan, Lang/Baumann and Ugo Rondinone along the route of line 14. The last of the artworks, Beautiful Bridge, was unveiled and inaugurated in Bernex in November 1, 2022. Since December 1st 2016 the Monochrome Rose streetcar by Pipilotti Rist has served as a connection between the artworks along the 6.5-kilometre route connecting Cornavin and Bernex.

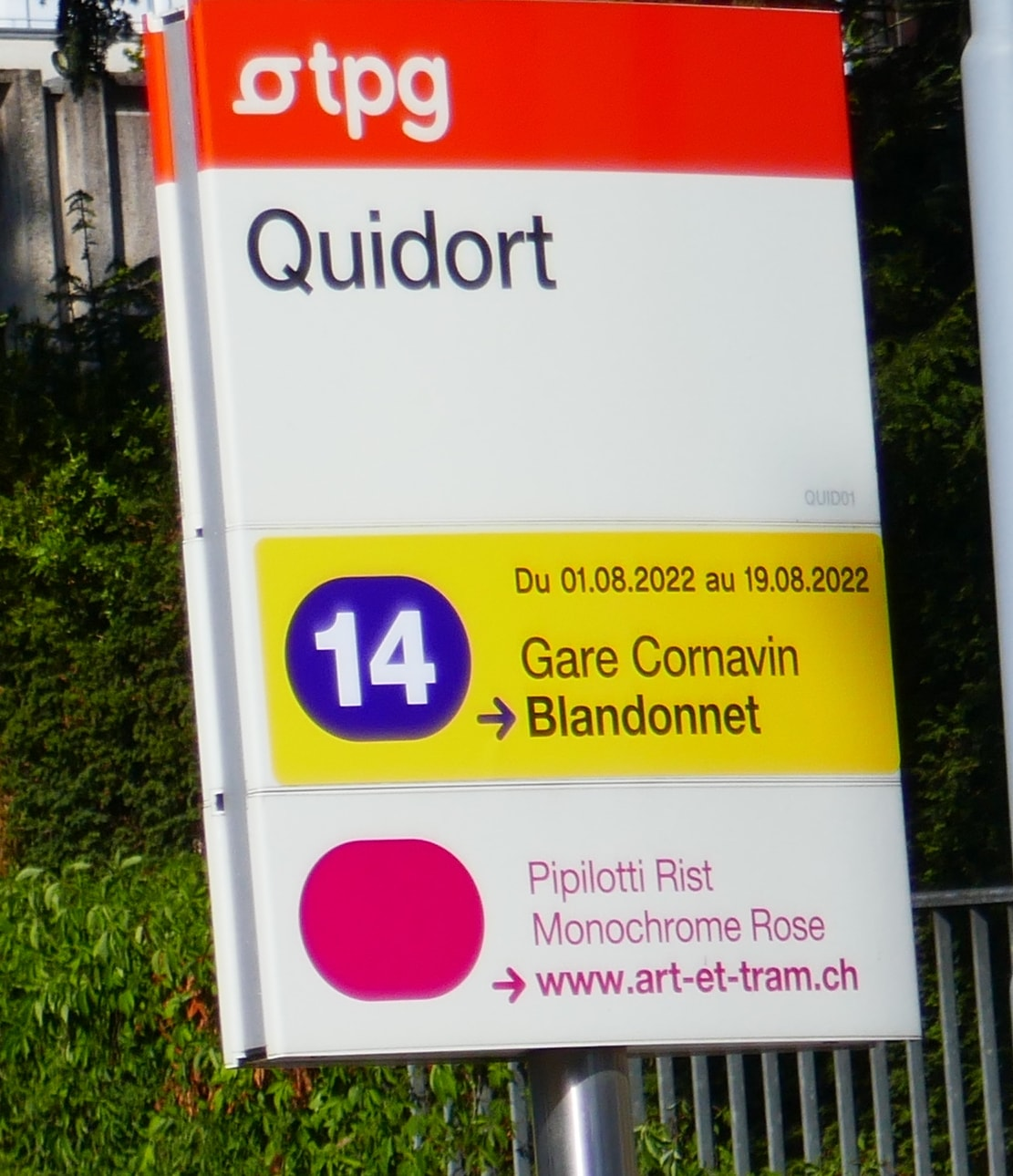
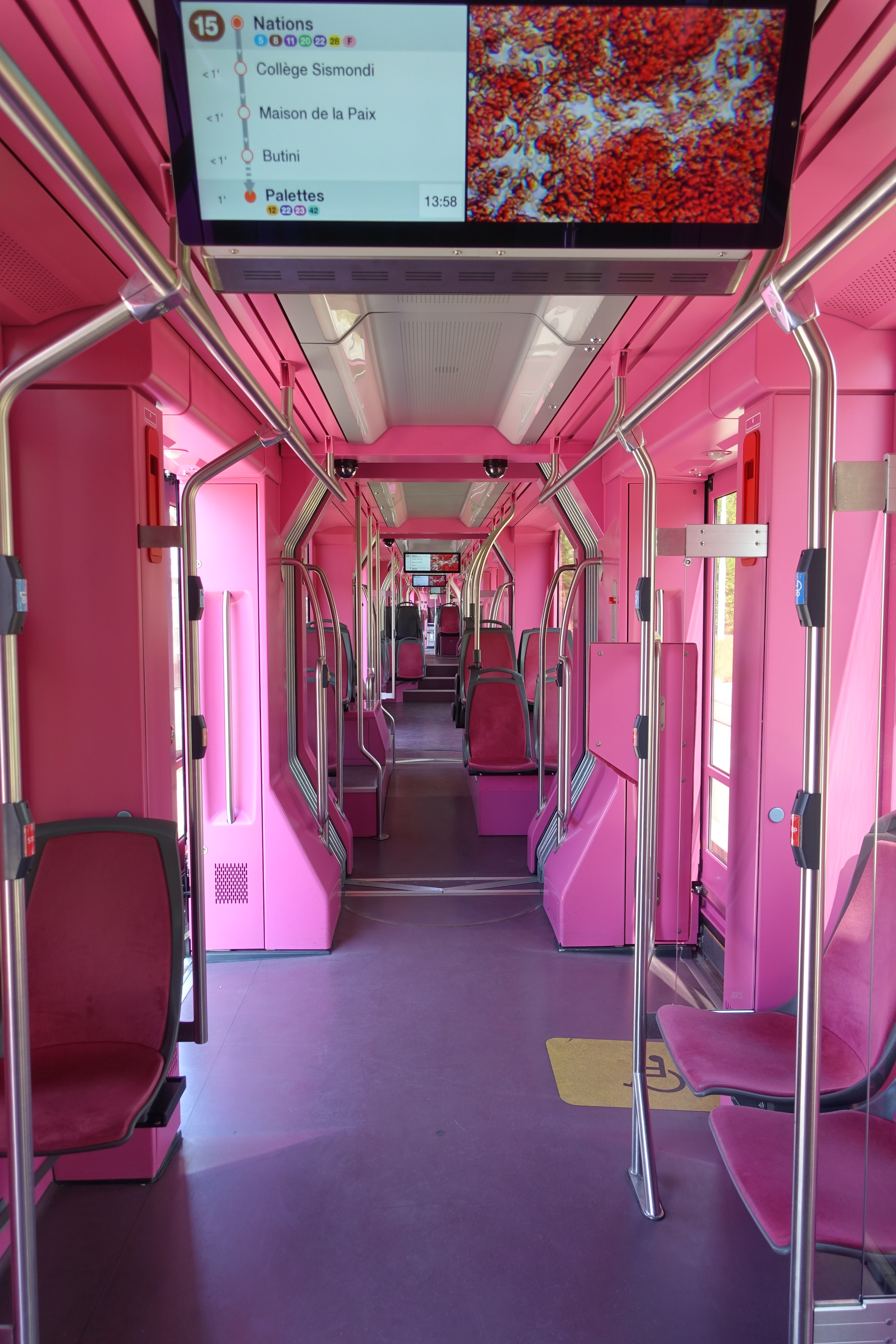
Tram stop at Petit Lancy (left),
Interior of Monochrome Rose (right)

Rist had already submitted her project idea to the authorities in 2009, but it was not until seven years later that she was awarded the contract: "When I submitted it, there were hardly any themed or advertising streetcars. A streetcar completely without advertising and in a single color has a special effect: the monochrome contrasts all the other colors. Suddenly you see the sky in a completely different light. Or the gray of the ground. That's what interested me: That you can trigger conversations, encounters and discussions with such an everyday vehicle."

The cultural education agency "Kuverum Kulturvermittlung" designed nine educational projects for the traveling work of art under the title rose explose. It aims at encouraging educational institutions to develop ideas for small workshops. The color pink was supposed to initiate thoughts, conversations and new encounters. Rist's intention was to enable passengers to take a meditative break.

Examples of projects include:

- Complimenrose – Moments of happiness on the go: small cards with compliments written by pupils were spread out on the streetcar seats. The card was supposed to be passed on to another person after reading, but should remain in the streetcar. The idea was to create conversation topics. Additionally possible compliments were displayed on a screen.
- MonLieuRose – Show us your Geneva! Pictures of personal favorite places in Geneva were to be taken and uploaded to Instagram: Places that were "la vie en rose" or inspire, even without rose-colored glasses.
- Penser en rose – Thought trips, a streetcar ride: Perception exercises marked the beginning: Participants were asked to close their eyes and imagine they were in a white room that is being colored pink and becomes distorted. They should talk about their fantasies and then write, for example about a memory of a pink object.
- Tramku – Writing Japanese Poetry in a tramway car: Participants were taught the basic rules of the Japanese poetry form haiku and wrote some on their own during their ride in the streetcar.
