= Ever Is Over All =

1997 audiovisual installation by Pipilotti Rist

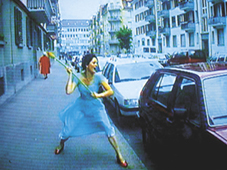
Ever Is Over All, Still

Ever Is Over All is an audiovisual installation by Swiss artist Pipilotti Rist created in 1997.

== Description ==
One wall of the over-corner projection shows a cheerful woman in a turquoise summer dress with high red shoes.

With swinging steps, she walks in slow motion along the sidewalk past parked cars. She swings a crested torch lily and smashes the glass panes of passenger doors with obvious pleasure, followed by a broad smile on her face. A passerby coming towards her looks at her with interest, but does not intervene. A policewoman overtakes her and greets her in a friendly manner.

On the other wall are close-ups of the crested torch lily, flowers and buds in bright colors. In the background a meadow turned 90 degrees to the right appears, on which a person is sitting. This video is not limited to the second wall, but overlaps with the first video.

The sound of the video was created by Anders Guggisberg and Pipilotti Rist. It consists of a slow, repetitive, simple melody, partly accompanied by humming, singing la-la-la and the sound of a pane of shattering glass.

The video showing the woman lasts four minutes, the other nine; both run in a loop.

The question of whether the artist herself plays the main role in this video was repeatedly raised, bringing the tradition of self-portrait into play. In interviews, however, Rist rejected the interpretation of her works as self-portraits; it should not matter whether she herself acts in the video. In an interview in 2001, the artist stated that the documentary filmmaker Silvana Ceschi played the leading role in Ever Is Over All. A photograph from the time of the production process, which is labeled accordingly, shows Rist's role: she can be seen on it as a darkly dressed person in pants, with glasses and a cap, filming the other person. The little woman in the red coat smiling at the protagonist is the artist's mother, Anna Rist. Also involved were: Ian Mathys, Aufdi Aufdermauer, Gabrielle Hächler, Tom Rist, Mich Hertig, Gian Wilhelm, Anahita Krzyzanowski, Martin Fischer, Donner Trepp, Christian Davi, Attila Panzel, Manuela Wirth, Brigitte Hofer, Garage Giuseppe Cannizzo, Serge Nyffeler, Meret and Maxi Mars Matter and Gregor Meier.

== Art historical classification and interpretation ==
=== Presentation and aesthetics ===
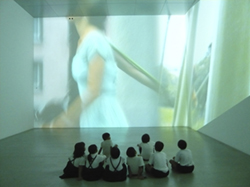
Ever Is Over All, installation view

Sip My Ocean (1996) is seen as a precursor to Ever Is Over All in terms of the way it is presented. Both combine the performative, slapstick-like aspects of the artist's early works with a more structured form of presentation. Color and viewpoint still play a major role. Ever Is Over All also features close-ups of natural elements, tracking shots and the use of several cameras. But the overall impression is more oriented towards the aesthetics of cinema rather than emphasizing the technical aspects. Fade-ins and jump cuts, for example, take up a much larger space, and there is experimentation with the possibilities of projection and overlapping on a grand scale. These two videos therefore mark the beginning of a new kind of video presentation in Rist's work: Breaking the boundaries of the screen and merging with the architectural conditions of the exhibition space. Joan Jones understands the type of projection of the video showing nature which does not stop at the corner as a comment on the protagonist's actions: The flower becomes a powerful tool in her hands.

Rist's former assistant Nadia Schneider Willen views the reason for the policewoman's friendliness from a higher perspective: A flower could become the tool of an action perceived as destruction because, from the perspective of a molecule, there is no intentional destruction of things at all, only becoming and passing away. Juliana Engbert, on the other hand, emphasizes the double character of the crested torch lily as a prerequisite for the joke of the video: It is a flower with soft petals on the one hand and a hard stick on the other. The plant's English name, Red Hot Poker, contains poker, which also makes think of poking stick. Under the cheerful surface of the video, anger and aggression smoulder. Engbert describes Rist as a happy anarchist who conveys pleasure and joy to her audience. This tendency from the early works is continued here. According to Engbert, Rist's involvement of the viewer is the reason why this video is still shown comparatively often.

According to Jones, the red shoes remind of Dorothy's magical red shoes from the film The Wizard of Oz, which can be used to grant wishes.

=== Femininity and feminism ===
Rist portrays the female body even more insistently as the subject of the movie look in this work than in earlier works. At the same time, she deals with conventions and limitations of this gaze in an increasingly complex and ambiguous way.

In Rist's art, the feminine has great significance. It is not in the demarcation from the masculine or in seduction that femininity becomes tangible, but „it is a friendly sexuality that celebrates the pure joy of life." The extremely strong femininity even suspends the laws of physics, so that windscreens can be smashed by a flower. The fire lily has a double connotation: As a flower it retains its connection to the feminine, but in its phallic form it is a symbol of power. Flowers have pollen and stigma, male and female reproductive parts, and in Rist's work they merge female and male imagery, according to Mangini. The policewoman also belongs to two worlds: Wearing a uniform she is part of the patriarchal system, but as a woman she can leave this role and react to the protagonist's action with kindness.

It was this video, among others, that established Rist's reputation as a feminist artist. She commented that she was a feminist in a political sense, but not in a personal one. The image of the woman in her art stands for the human being as such, not just for the woman. She hopes that a young woman can gain as much from her art as a man. „I always have two answers to the question of whether I am a feminist. If a good person asks me, I am not a feminist. We women have achieved a lot, and always insisting on the rights of our own group seems selfish to me. If a macho man asks me, I will of course say that I am a feminist."

=== Sound ===
In an interview with Massimiliano Gioni, Rist said that the sound of the work should be seen as a kind of homeopathic antidote to the many noises of electrical and electronic devices that surround us. These drive us crazy, and an antidote of the same kind is needed for healing, namely the humming in the video. The idea that art can heal does not frighten her.

Engberg emphasizes the importance of sound for the effect of the artwork. She stated that this melody with its catchy, heartbeat-like drum rhythm has succeeded in breaking through the fourth wall that separates the artwork from the audience. She observed that the audience showed strong solidarity with the protagonist, the humming suggested safety and security, and when it resumed after the glass broke and a moment of silence, all was right with the world again.

Mangini points out the difference between the two soundtracks and their intertwining with the image. One melody accompanies the action, the other soundtrack is a light, melodic humming. After a few minutes, not only the speed of the image changes, but also the rhythm of the melody.

=== Nature ===
According to Hans-Peter Wipplinger, Rist is in this video figuratively helping nature pushed back by cars and roads to regain its right to lost territory. The torch lily invades the space of civilization without being restrained. The second projection of the video, the field of torch lilies, is an expression of the "need for sensual perception" propagated by Rist. This dream-like sequence stands in contrast to the banal world of the street.

=== Mythological references ===
Nava Sevilla-Sadehn sees a reference to the ancient maenads in the video.

== Reception ==
According to Engbert, this video is presented with above-average frequency in museums. In 1997, Rist took part in the 47th Venice Biennale with this video and was awarded the Premio 2000 for this work. In 2006/2007 it was part of the exhibition Out of Time: A Contemporary View at the Museum of Modern Art in New York, and in 2015 it was shown at the Kunsthalle Krems as part of the solo exhibition Pipilotti Rist. Come darling, let's change the media & start again from the beginning.

The writer and playwright Sibylle Berg said that Ever Is Over All was the first work by Pipilotti Rist that she had seen. Rist is the heroine of Berg's generation. Natasha Bullock, curator of Rist's exhibition Sip My Ocean at the Museum of Contemporary Art in Sydney (2017/2018), also highlights this video as the initial spark of her enthusiasm for the freedom and anarchy that she sees in Rist's work.

In 2016, Beyoncé used a similar scene in the music video for the song Hold Up.

== Literature ==
- Rosanne Ava Jonkhout: The substantiality of black feminism versus white feminism, as illustrated by Beyoncé's appropriation of Pipilotti Rist's Ever is Over All (1997). 2016.
