= I'm Not The Girl Who Misses Much =

1986 multimedia installation by Pipilotti Rist

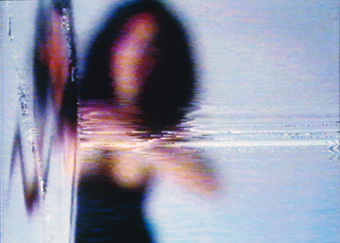
Video still from I'm Not The Girl Who Misses Much

I'm Not The Girl Who Misses Much is a 1986 multimedia installation art piece by Swiss artist Pipilotti Rist. It includes distorted images and sound of the artist performing Happiness Is a Warm Gun (originally by The Beatles).

== Production process ==
I′m Not The Girl Who Misses Much is a single-channel video and is the artist's first video work while she was a student at Schule für Gestaltung Basel in the Audiovisual Communication program. Rist developed the video single-handedly in her studio, a creation process she later used with her piece, Selbstlos im Lavabad (1994). The video has a total length of 5 minutes.

== Description ==
In this video, Pipilotti Rist appears in the role of a singer. Her breasts deliberately spill out of her black dress while she jerks her body across the screen in front of a red background. The protagonist repeatedly sings parts of the song Happiness Is a Warm Gun, which was created in 1968 by John Lennon and Paul McCartney for their White Album and dedicated by John Lennon to his partner Yoko Ono. Rist changed the verse She′s not the girl who misses much to I'm not the girl who misses much. In this way, the artist does not leave the description of herself as a person to other people but defines herself in a powerful and self-determined way.

Image and sound are distorted in various ways: The image is blurred, white lines of an electronic sound signal constantly move from top to bottom over Rist's body or through it in the first part of the video. Later, the image distortion occurs through jagged vertical lines which lead the left part of the image to a standstill. It shifts further and further to the right until it finally stops, while the sound continues. This occurs in a loop. In this phase, the background is no longer red, but beige. The sound in general is distorted by a fast forward effect, which as a result generates a cartoonish voice. Later, the sound is muffled by slow motion rendering the lyrics barely understandable.

At the very end, Lennon can be heard singing part of the song but with the original lyrics, She′s not the girl who misses much. You can still see the singer but now located in front of a blue background.

== Classification and interpretation ==
=== Representation of the body ===
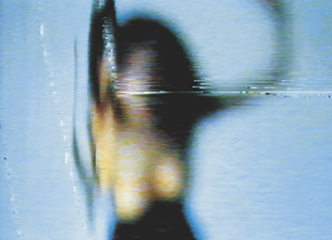
I′m Not The Girl Who Misses Much, videostill

Visual artist Joan Jonas acknowledges a parallel to the first depictions of hysterical women by Jean-Martin Charcot in Paris in the 19th century, in which women acted out seizures for the camera. However, by switching from the third to the first person in the first song line, the artist redefines the relationship between subject and object. In her later work, this became a recurring theme. By breaking with the demotion of the female body in media depictions of the time, she appropriates the narrative and makes it her own. In a way, the audience is encouraged to pay attention to their own bodies.

In this early work, Rist presents us with the voyeuristic camera view on the female body according to Elisabeth Bronfen, but at the same time destroys its effect in three ways: dance movements and voice appear distorted, the body is darkened by a color filter and blurred throughout the work. Although the breasts are visible, there is no erotic pleasure. In the few bars of the song that can be heard at normal speed in the end, John Lennon′s voice acts as a counterpoint to the female vocals.

The distortions created in post-production prevent the body from becoming an object for the spectators. It can be seen as a tool to avoid the fetishization of the female body. By this she joins the ranks of other female media artists and filmmakers such as Nan Hoover, who used close-ups of body parts as a means of de-objectification and desexualization in works such as Landscape (1983). Rist developed this approach further in later works such as Pickelporno (1992).

The question has often occurred whether Rist was delivering a personal statement through her artwork or whether the depiction can also be generalized and its meaning transferred to other women of her generation, which would put it in a social-political context. Laura Leuzzi tends towards the second option. She reads the work as deliberately undermining common beauty ideals through the means of distortion and alienation effects to reference social and gender norms.

=== Media criticism ===
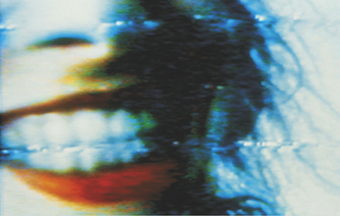
I’m Not The Girl Who Misses Much, video still

Rist takes her cues from the duration and playful erotic soundtrack of advertising clips and music videos of the time. However, she clearly distinguishes the work from these genres by sometimes reducing the speed of the image, sometimes speeding it up, and repeating the song line several times. In addition, the image is disturbed by the lines that distort the image.

In an interview with Jane Harris, Rist described her bodily movements in this work as an "exorcism dance". The movements in the video seem to break the boundaries of the screen and the motion of her arms and legs are reminiscent of dolls – which can be read as a reference to the audience to reflect upon whether they are still in control of their lives or whether their identity is already represented and interpreted by television images. The video has often been interpreted as a commentary on the remote-controlled human being, but the line-distorted presentation also draws attention to the monitor and the inadequacies of video technology.

The performance at some point seems to become in sync with the electronic impulses, the protagonist seems breathless and hysterical. Image and sound, video, and electronics create a harmonical flow. Here, as in later works, Rist′s frequent use of surveillance cameras and constant close-ups create a shift in perspective: the medium becomes the content.

== Museums and collections ==
Rist published the installation as an edited video in a “luxury box” in a limited edition of 300 copies as a VHS cassette.
