= TV-Lüster =

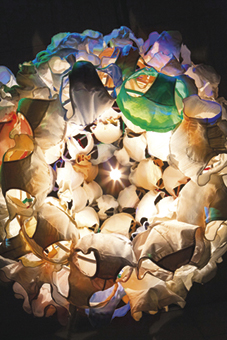
TV-Lüster (1993)

TV-Lüster (1993) (English: TV chandelier) is a 6-channel video installation by Swiss multimedia artist Pipilotti Rist from 1993. It has been on permanent display in the hall of the Kunstmuseum St. Gallen since 1994.

== Description ==
The object is composed of a steel skeleton and six ceiling-mounted monitors without casings. These are decorated as chandeliers with glass beads that sparkle like crystals. Each displays a turquoise-green eye directed at the viewer. A media recording of the artist's eyes. The settings change. The images on the two monitors, which are located on either side of the chandelier, are arranged along a vertical axis of symmetry. In the close-up view, the gaze falls into the darkness of the iris and the viewing angle is reversed: Now the viewers are looking into the eye or out through it again. The viewers are the eye. Image and sound run in a loop.

== Classification and interpretation ==
The installation is reminiscent of video surveillance systems, but also of the magic lantern, and poetically links these two associations. Video art pioneer Nam June Paik had already established these two elements as traditional themes in video art works.

A reflection on the medium of television is also intended. Rist said in an interview with the Swiss daily newspaper St. Galler Tagblatt that she hoped people would take the work TV-Lüster as an example and hang their flatscreens from their ceilings at home, which would create more space in the living area.
