= Homo Sapiens Sapiens (video) =

2005 audiovisual installation by Pipilotti Rist

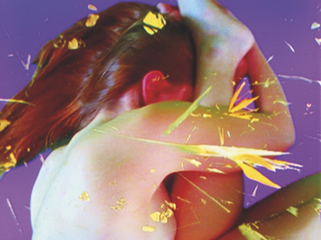
Homo Sapiens Sapiens, Videostill

Homo Sapiens Sapiens is an audiovisual installation by the Swiss artist Pipilotti Rist created in 2005.

== Description ==
A long-haired woman (Ewelina Guzik) lies naked on her back, crushing a ripe persimmon between her breasts, the yellow flesh of the fruit is squeezed out of its skin. The protagonist moves weightlessly in nature, floating amidst colorful plants in a sort of jungle. Fruit sprouts from a pomegranate, tropical plants wrap themselves around human bodies and intertwine with long hair. The woman crushes a fruit and the yellow pulp spreads across the room. Kaleidoscope-like images form the final sequence of the video.

== Creation and context ==
The video was created as Switzerland's contribution to the 51st Venice Biennale in 2005 and was projected onto the ceiling of the baroque church of San Stae in Venice. The optical depth of the video was achieved by experimenting with different lenses, which enable strong close-ups: Macro lens, fisheye lens and handheld camera. The sound was created by Pipilotti Rist and Anders Guggisberg. Pipilotti Rist collaborated again with dancer Ewelina Guzik. The Roman Curia, which oversees the Biennale exhibitions, ordered the installation shut down after two months, officially due to ″technical problems″.

== Title ==
From the 1930s to the 1990s Homo sapiens sapiens was used as taxonomic binomial species name for modern humans. This term, in contrast to Homo sapiens neanderthalensis, made it clear that neanderthals and modern humans were considered members of the same species. Today, however, Homo sapiens is used as the scientific term coined by Carl von Linné in 1766.

== Art historical classification and interpretation ==
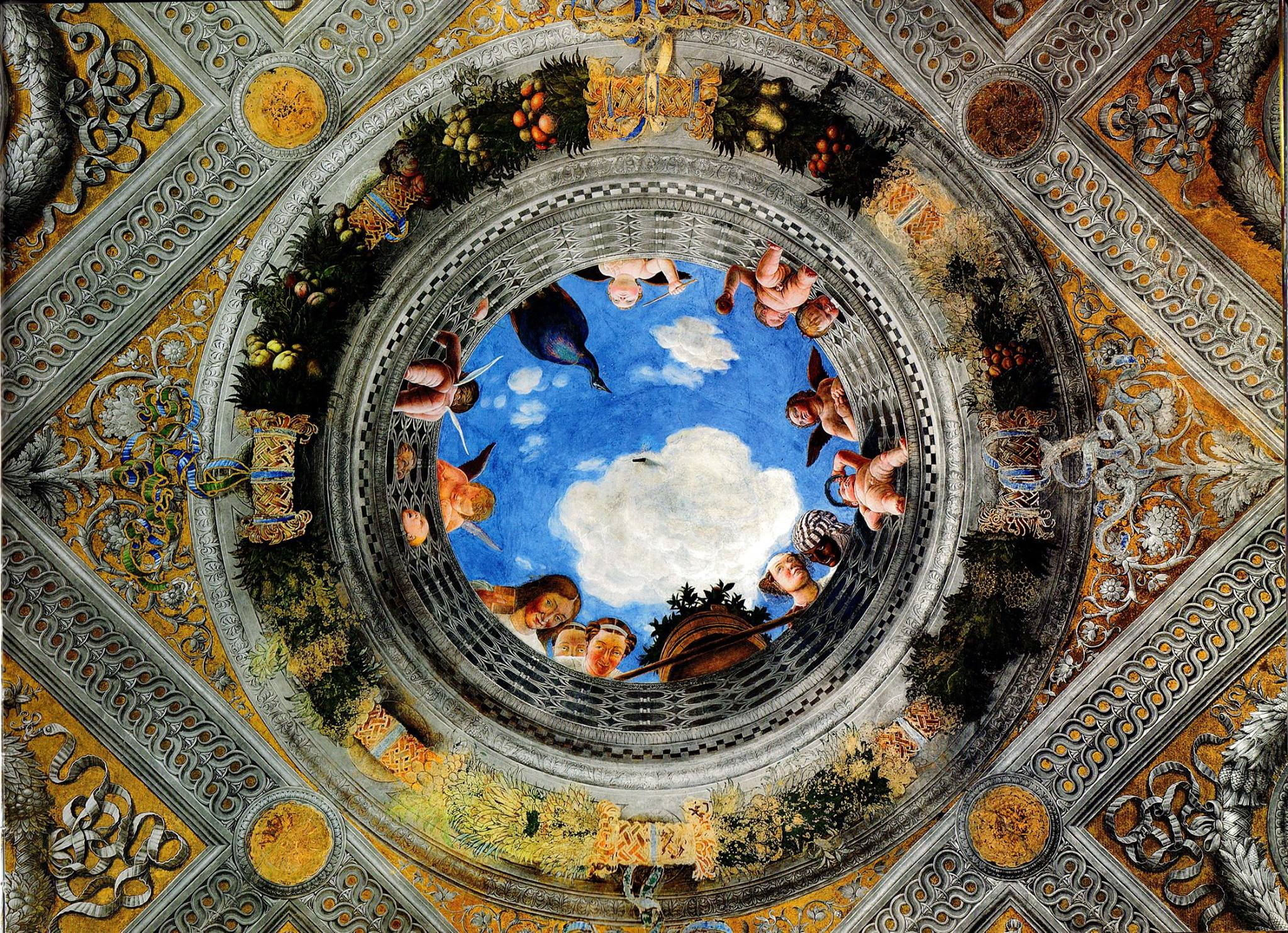
The Opaion of the Camera degli Sposi

At the time the video installation was created, Rist's art moved away from the television set in various ways and in different dimensions. While Selbstlos im Lavabad (1994), for example, shows a tiny round monitor set in a cut-out in the floor, the dimensions in Homo Sapiens Sapiens are huge. The paradisical world which Rist created here is reminiscent of the biblical Garden of Eden before the Fall of man: a pure, lush world of physical freedom in which the sexual exploration of people and plants remains without sanction. Underwater shots create an atmosphere of flowing surrender, and the relationship between nature and culture is explored on a metaphorical level.

The videoprojection onto the church ceiling follows the tradition of the illusionistic ceiling paintings of the Renaissance, such as Mantegna's trompe-l'œil in the Camera degli Sposi in Mantua. In Venice, Giovanni Battista Tiepolo, for example, used perspective tricks to achieve an effect of depth. In Homo Sapiens Sapiens, a huge eye looked down onton the audience, who had made themselves comfortable on mattresses. Considering the summer heat outside the church, this place was a welcome haven of peace. According to Juliana Engberg, the purely feminine world of pleasure was superimposed on the male martyrs and church fathers immortalized in church paintings. According to Rist, works of art could dissolve architectural realities.

As in Sip My Ocean, here too kaleidoscopic, axially symmetrical images are shown that suggest limitless and endless repetitions.

In connection with the presentation of her later videos, Rist repeatedly created the possibility of experiencing space and art together in a relaxed atmosphere. In a conversation with Massimiliano Gioni in 2016, Rist stated that she believed in installations as places of gathering. In her opinion Homo Sapiens Sapiens had shown that during the shared enjoyment of art, viewers and art work interacted and that it was possible to let a fusion of feelings and knowledge ermerge in the audience.
