= Pepperminta =

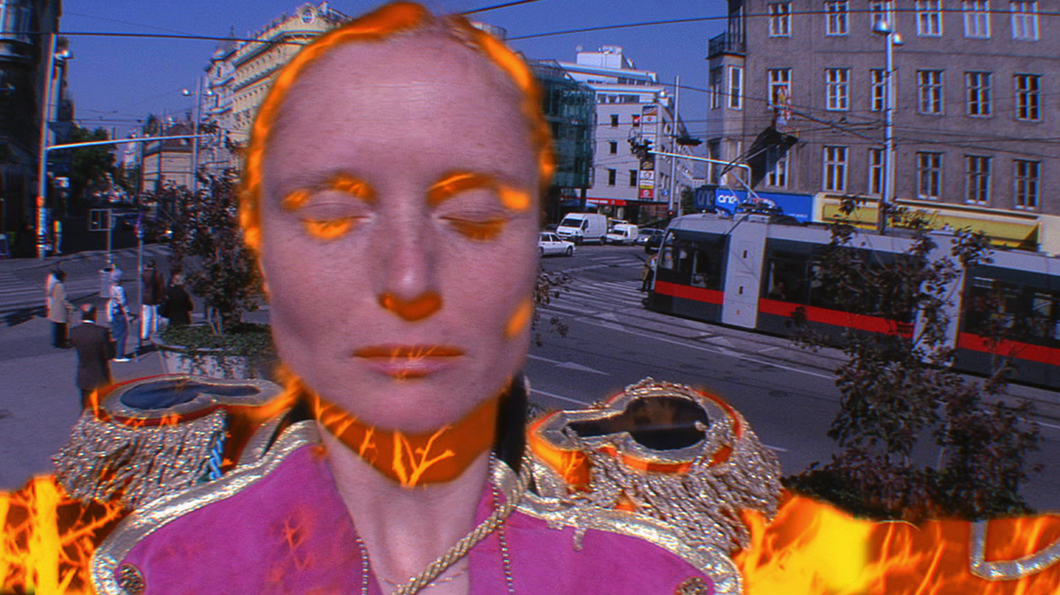
- Pepperminta (film still)
- Directed by: Pipilotti Rist
- Written by: Pipilotti Rist; Chris Niemeyer
- Produced by: Christian Davi; Christof Neracher; Antonin Svoboda
- Starring: Ewelina Guzik; Sven Pippig; Sabine Timoteo; Elisabeth Orth; Oliver Akwe; Hanspeter Bader; Noëmi Leonhardt; Lena Reichmuth
- Cinematography: Pierre Mennel
- Edited by: Gion-Reto Killias
- Music by: Andreas Guggisberg; Roland Widmer
- Release date: 5 September 2009
- Running time: 84 minutes
- Countries: Switzerland; Austria
- Language: German

Pepperminta is the first feature film written and directed by Swiss video artist Pipilotti Rist from 2009. Filmed in Vienna and St. Gallen, the experimental film is commonly read as a modern fairy tale. It depicts a group of friends who embark on a journey to save the world through color. It premiered on September 5, 2009, at the 66th Venice International Film Festival in the Horizons (Orizzonti) section.

== Content ==
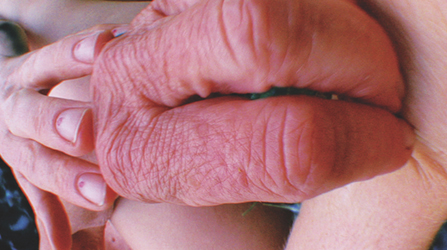
Pepperminta (film still)

Protagonist Pepperminta (Ewelina Guzik) at the beginning of the film is a 10-year-old girl who lives alone in a rainbow colored villa and holds strawberries as pets. Her educational substitute for a parent is an "apple-sized talking eye which she calls Grandma". It gives her "pithy advice" such as: Always do what you're too scared to do! Later, when she is grown up, her greatest wish is for everyone to see the world in their favorite colors, and she is gifted with unique powers to help people achieving it. Together with her hypochondriac friend Werwen (Sven Pippig), her pansexual sister Edna NeinNeinNein Tulip (Sabine Timoteo), and the elderly Leopoldine (Elisabeth Orth), she sets out to free people from their grey and colorless life. In the course of the film, they roam the Swiss cities of Vienna and Zürich, a restaurant is turned upside down, students are literally painted with bright colors and police officers attacked with fruit.

== Background and production ==
Rist's intention was to transfer her artistic signature from the medium of video to the medium of film, a long-standing wish as she confessed to the online magazine swissinfo.ch. The main difference between Pepperminta and her video works is the existence of a feature film plot. Rist said about the film, Pepperminta and her sister Edna existed in a space before the Fall of man, "beyond social classes or time references". Since Pepperminta has a special relationship with colors and their effects on people and situations, fights social conventions and phobias, she follows the principles that, according to Rist, also characterize Rist's art.

Rist worked on Pepperminta from 2005 to 2009. Chris Niemeyer, who co-wrote the screenplay with Rist, describes how they worked on the script every day from noon to 6 p. m. for six months. The time frame was "ironclad" in his words. Filming took place in the Alter Rhein and in the outdoor pool. Other locations include the University of Vienna and the tram station at Maria-Theresien-Platz in Vienna.

Like Rist's stage name, the title character's name can be traced back to Pippi Longstocking. One of Longstocking's given names is Pepperminta. Chris Niemeyer, who worked on the screenplay together with Rist, sees the basic idea behind the fairy tale story in Pepperminta in the desire to free the world from fear.

== Release and budget ==
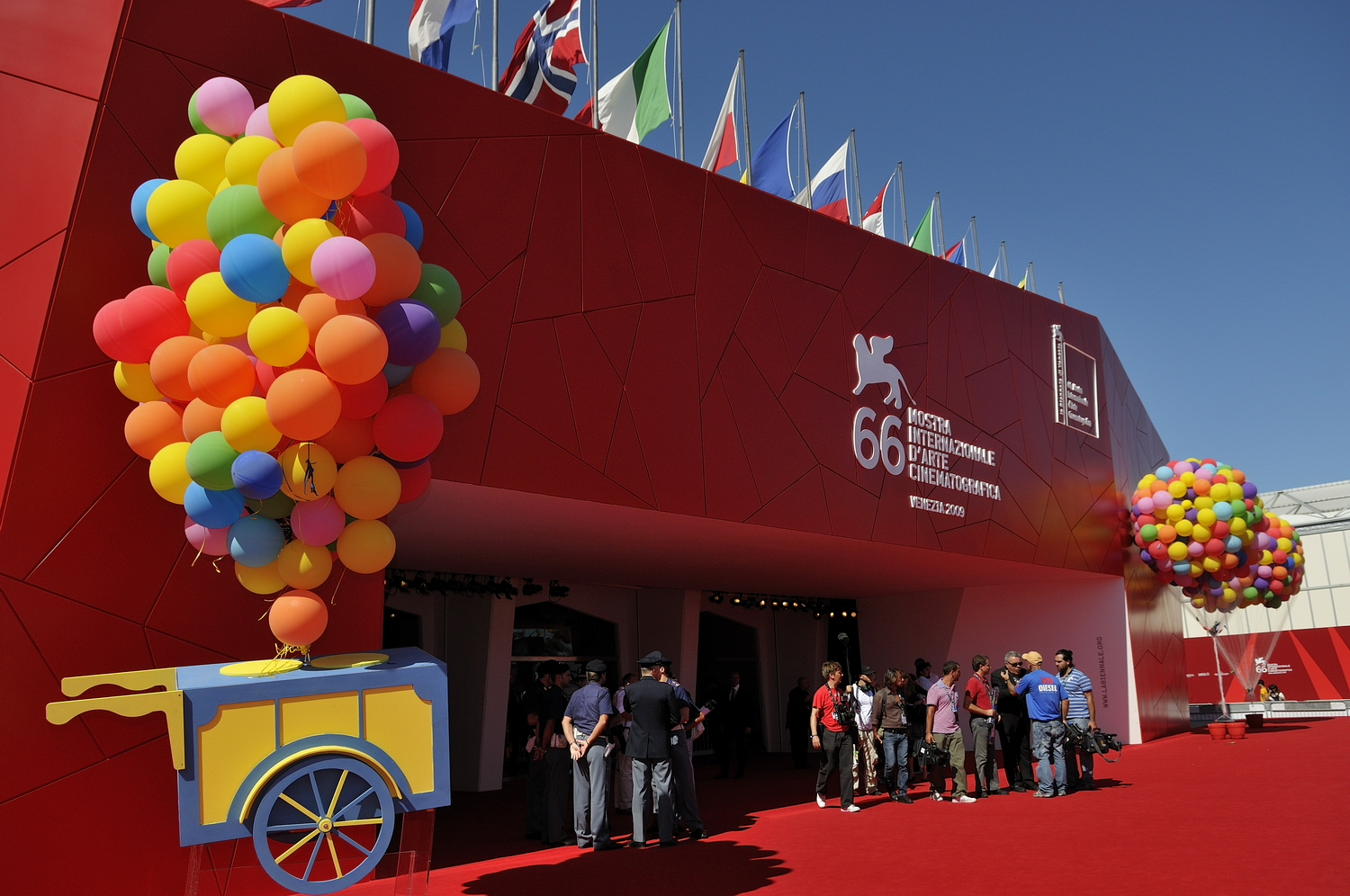
66th Venice International Film Festival

The film premiered on September 5, 2009, at the 66th Venice International Film Festival in the Horizons (Orizzonti) section and had its official release for German language cinemas on September 10, 2009. The release in the French region of Switzerland was on February 3, 2010. It was invited to the Sundance Film Festival, the International Film Festival Rotterdam, Filmfest Hamburg, Durban International Film Festival and the Leeds International Film Festival, among others.

The budget was estimated at 2 million Euro.

== Critical response ==
Reactions to the film were ambivalent, but Pepperminta was consistently praised by people interested in contemporary art.

Eduard Ulrich had mixed feelings about the film and gave it 3 out of 5 stars on the Swiss film portal cineman.ch: "Pepperminta, the artistically gifted sister of Pippi Longstocking and probably Pipilotti Rist's alter ego, seduces with her childlike charm and her naked body. It doesn't hurt that the message is soon clear. If you don't have to puzzle over a story, your head is free for an intoxication through the images. They are clear and clean – Rist is a professional, she has mastered slow motion, fast motion and fisheye, and uses them extensively, almost excessively. Dramaturgically, however, the series of episodes and video clips by the highly talented and highly educated Rist overestimates itself." Geneviève Rossier states on the film portal cineuropa.org: "Rist's feminine universe depicted with extravagance and sensuality is certainly on full show in Pepperminta."

Gini Brenner of the Austrian film magazin Skip wrote: "Her first feature film is a cheerfully absurd, light-heartedly exaggerated trip full of grotesque scenes and beautiful images, which, as in her world-famous installations, combines apparent naivety with deep political awareness and great artistic density." The German Lexikon des internationalen Films (Encyclopedia of International Film) concluded: "A visually grandiose comedy with psychedelic echoes and many side blows against the establishment."

== Awards ==
- 2009: Festival de Cine Europeo de Sevilla, President of the Jury's Extraordinary Award (Nicolas Roeg)
- 2010: Miami International Film Festival – Grand Jury Prize in the category Cutting the Edge & Cutting the Edge Video Art Competition as a "Cutting the Edge Feature Film".

== Sequel ==
Rist used footage created for Pepperminta in her video Tender Room. It was shown in 2011 at the Wexner Center for the Arts in Columbus, Ohio. The images focus on Eve and a paradisical vegetation, creating a counterbalance to the emotional coldness of the architecture. The video was projected onto six suspended screens. Adhesive foil, mostly in pink, was attached to the curtain wall that closed off the viewing area. Seating furniture in matching colors and sizes invited people to enjoy the art together. Sylvia Lavin concluded in the magazine Artforum: "This intersection of two seemingly incompatible orders—Rist's uncertain vulnerability and Eisenman's hostile hyperrationality—catalyzed a new spatial economy generated by irreducible moments of experience to which no conventions of value can be attached."

In a conversation with Richard Julin, Rist placed Pepperminta in a generational line with later video works: In the feature film Pepperminta, the protagonist lives in the space before the fall of man, in her art work Liberty, A Statue For Löndon she has returned to civilization, and in Tyngdkraft, var min vän she overcomes seasons and gravity, and, together with an androgynous person, she flies away from the world.
