= Pipilotti Rist =

Swiss contemporary artist

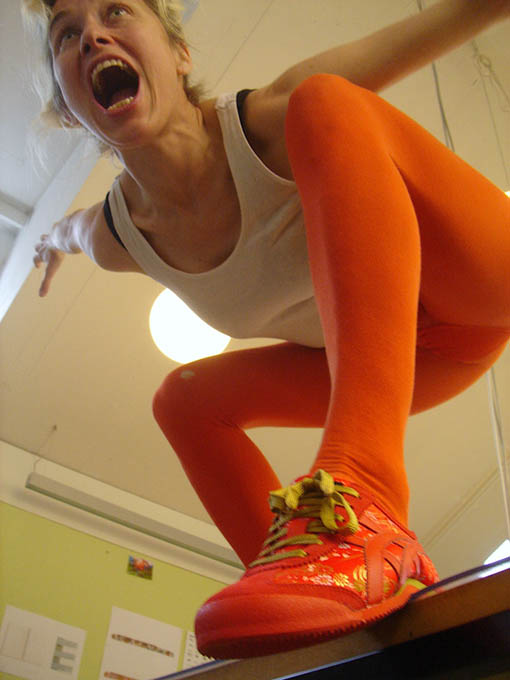
- Portrait image of Pipilotti Rist
- Born: Elizabeth Rist; 21 June 1962 (age 64); Grabs, Canton of St. Gallen, Switzerland
- Education: Institute of Applied Arts, Schule für Gestaltung
- Known for: Video art
- Notable work: Pepperminta, I'm Not The Girl Who Misses Much, Pickelporno, Ever is Over All, Pixelwald
- Awards: Joan Miró Prize (2009)
- Website: pipilottirist.net

Pipilotti Rist, birth name Elizabeth Rist (born 21 June 1962), is a Swiss visual artist who works in experimental video art and installation art. Her work is often described as surreal, intimate and abstract, often depicting the human body.

Rist's work is known for its multi-sensory qualities, with overlapping projected imagery that is highly saturated with color, paired with sound components that are part of a larger environment with spaces for viewers to rest or lounge. Rist's work often transforms the architecture or environment of a white cube gallery into a more immersive, tactile, auditory and visual experience. Her works are held by many important art collections worldwide.

== Early life and education ==
Elizabeth Rist was born in the Rhine Valley of Switzerland. She is the second of five children of Anna Lippuner, a primary school teacher, and Walter Rist-Lippuner, a village doctor. Her father, a construction site physician in Sedrun, located in the swiss canton Grisons, spent a lot of time in the darkroom, developed his X-ray images, as well as many of his own photographs. Over the years, he became a passionate photographer.

In 1982, Rist started going by "Pipilotti", a combination of her childhood nickname "Lotti" and her childhood hero, Astrid Lindgren's character Pippi Longstocking, who she saw as standing for unconventionality, wildness, cheerfulness and imagination.

Before studying art and film, Rist studied theoretical physics in Vienna for one semester.

From 1982 to 1986, Rist studied commercial art, illustration, and photography at the University of Applied Arts Vienna. She later studied video at the Basel School of Design, Switzerland. During her studies, Rist began making super 8 films.

From 1988 through 1994, Rist was member of the band and performance group Les Reines Prochaines.

In 1997, Rist's work was featured for the second time in the Venice Biennial, where she was awarded the Premio 2000 Prize.

From 2002 to 2003, Rist was invited by Paul McCarthy to teach at UCLA as a visiting faculty member.

== Work ==
Rist's works generally last only a few minutes, borrowing from mass-media formats such as musical films, MTV and advertising, with alterations in their colors, speed, and sound.

Rist's works often treat issues related to gender, sexuality, and the human body. Colorful and musical, her works transmit a sense of happiness and self-fulfilling positive energy.

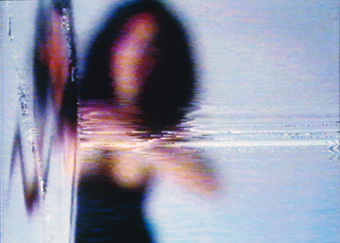
I'm Not The Girl Who Misses Much (Film still, 1986)

In I'm Not The Girl Who Misses Much (1986) Rist dances in front of a camera in a black dress with half-uncovered breasts. The images are often monochromatic and fuzzy. Rist repeatedly sings "I'm not the girl who misses much", a reference to the first line of the song "Happiness Is a Warm Gun" by the Beatles. As the video approaches its end, the image becomes increasingly blue and fuzzy and the sound slows down.

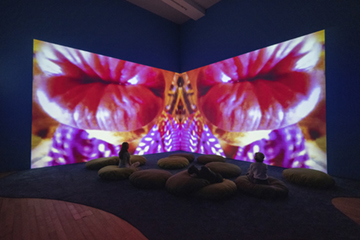
Sip My Ocean (Installation view, 1996)

Sip my Ocean (1996) is an audio-video installation projected as a mirrored reflection on two adjoining walls, duplicating the video as sort of Rorschach inkblots. Besides a television and teacups, other domestic items can be seen sinking slowly under the ocean surface. The video is intercut with dreamlike frames of bodies swimming underwater and other melancholic images such as colourful overlays of roses across the heavens. Slightly abstract and layered the visuals invite the viewer to reveal their depth beneath the surface. Accompanying the video is Rist singing Chris Isaak's "Wicked Game". Her voice starts sweetly but becomes gradually out of synchronicity with the song, ending in the shrieking chorus of “No, I don’t wanna fall in love”. Rist breaks the illusion of synchronicity in the video with the asynchrony of the audio and captures the human longing for and impossibility of being totally in tune with somebody else.

Ever Is Over All (1997) shows in slow-motion a young woman walking along a city street, smashing the windows of parked cars with a large hammer in the shape of a tropical flower. At one point a police officer greets her. The audio video installation has been purchased by the Museum of Modern Art in New York City. The work was referenced in Beyoncé's visual album Lemonade (2016).

I want to see how you see – a portrait of Cornelia Providori (2003) is an audio-visual work spanning 5 minutes and 16 seconds. The sound was created in collaboration with Andreas Guggisberg, with whom Rist frequently works. The main subject is the dialectical tension between macro and micro and how the continents are mirrored on the human body. The technical components are two to four layers of edited images, intricately cut and stacked on top of each other.

When interviewed by The Guardian for a preview of her 2011 exhibition at London's Hayward gallery, Rist described her feminism: "Politically," she says, "I am a feminist, but personally, I am not. For me, the image of a woman in my art does not stand just for women: she stands for all humans. I hope a young guy can take just as much from my art as any woman."

Rist has likened her videos to that of women's handbags, hoping that they'd have “room in them for everything: painting, technology, language, music, lousy flowing pictures, poetry, commotion, premonitions of death, sex, and friendliness."

== Artistic dimensions of the work ==
Rist's work reflects “the perception of reality shaped by the media”. At the same time, she conveys “alternative views of her own physicality, social context and reality.” Her work is characterized by a mixture of “subversion and hilarity”, according to the accompanying text to the Pipilotti Rist star cut in the weekly newspaper Die Zeit in 2015. In addition to video installations and experimental films, her works also include environments, objects, computer art and digital photomontages.

=== Further development of video technology ===
In 2016, Rist said that her work over the past 30 years had been significantly influenced by the technology available at the time. As an example, she cited the so-called lipstick camera (a surveillance camera) in Pickelporno, which enabled her to get very close to the skin without creating shadows. The decisive factor in the use of technical innovations is the goals for which they are used and who has the power over them. Rist sees audio-video technology as a reflection of our senses. RGB technology, for example, is a rudimentary copy of the human eye and therefore an artistic tool of her choice.

Rist used various technical formats, including Super 8, VHS, U-matic, Hi8, MiniDVDs, underwater, endoscopic and digital film technology. In an interview with Massimiliano Gioni, the artist described how she initially used Super 8 animation films and slides to create stage effects for concerts, for example for Les Reines des Couteaux and Billion Bob and the Family. In this strongly application-oriented phase, she was concerned with finding suitable techniques for cross-fades and color changes. However, working with Super 8 technology was expensive and time-consuming, as the films first had to be developed before editing. In the mid-1980s, she therefore began studying at the Kunsthochschule Basel, which built on her vocational training in order to gain access to cameras and editing tables. She studied there together with Käthe Walser, Muda Mathis, among others. Her lecturer René Pulver had a lot of experience with video technology and introduced her to it.

In 1986, Rist submitted her video I'm Not The Girl Who Misses Much to the Solothurn Film Festival and was invited to show it at the Basel Gewerbemuseum (closed since 1996). She thus made the step from the world of cinema and music into the art scene. The magnetic videotapes were initially shown on television screens, e.g. in I'm Not the Girl who Misses Much, Sexy Sad I (1987) or Blutclip. Later it was extended to walls and large screens as expanded cinema - for example in Sip My Ocean (1996) and Ever Is Over All - or transferred to the privacy of a portable smartphone screen. According to Norton, the technical change was accompanied by a more intensive convergence of audience and image.

The monitor was then transformed from a presentation device into part of an installation, for example in TV Chandelier (1993). Later, the installation extended to entire exhibition spaces and included not only monitors and projection surfaces, but also other objects, some of which were also projected onto. The first example of this new type is Himalaya Goldstein's Stube (1999) with seven video projectors, some of which are integrated into furniture, an audio system and many other objects. Here, Rist made it possible to enter a completely furnished living room. Projections glide over the furniture like daydreams, everyday life and fantasy flow into one another.

In connection with Rist's camera work, the term “floating” is often used. For the artist, the camera and the object must be “at the same power level”. The camera glides over objects and bodies and creates a state of weightlessness, which is reinforced by the layout of the installations: the images transcend boundaries. They allow us to look down as if from the eyes of a giant (À la belle étoile), or the projection surface goes beyond the frame by not limiting the video to a screen or a wall, as in Administering Eternity (2011). The dissolution of the attachment to the body is just as much a part of the program as the liberation of the spirit. However, the floating can also stand for the state of unstable equilibrium, which tends towards a movement to one side or the other and can therefore be seen as a moment before tilting.

Rist often manipulates the flow of images. She delays it, her videos appear slowed down. She thus creates a suction effect in underwater or body worlds.

With extreme close-ups and the montage of images, Rist explored the possibilities of video technology as early as 1993 in Blutclip and showed shots of the inside of the body in combination with the depiction of planets.

She uses shifts in perspective and plays with focus to combine emotion and body. Reflection and symmetry play a role above all in the oversized videos that are projected onto a wall. Sometimes it is also a projection onto several walls that meet in the corner (e.g. Ever Is Over All) or even all-round projections (e.g. Pour Your Body Out. 7354 Cubic Meters (2008)) and alienating the existing architecture.

The curator Natasha Bullock saw color as the key to most of Rist's videos. Color is a form of artistic liberation in Rist's work, which stands out from the predominantly black-and-white videos by artists such as Valie Export. For Rist, color is a symbol of life. According to David Bachelor, color in Rist's work is less a property of the objects than a medium that flows between them: Color is perceived as fluid, yet simultaneously saturated and saturating. It ignores the solidity of things, boundaries dissolve and the color seeps and runs into objects and spaces in between. In a conversation with Simone Meier, Rist stated that the most important color for her is red.

For Pixelwald (2016), which consists of 3,000 handmade polycarbonate shells with LED lights, Rist collaborated with lighting designer Kaori Kuwabara. According to Bice Curiger, an image, although fragmented, is recognizable from a distance of 200 metres. Here, Rist once again followed her artistic line of using new technologies for her work. Her works demonstrated meticulous attention to detail and a desire for technical innovation.

=== Music and sound ===
Rist repeatedly emphasized the great importance of sound and music in her work. According to Rist, in a 1980s interview, bands such as the Television Personalities or Orange Juice from Great Britain and other European countries who performed at a nearby concert hall in Liechtenstein often stayed at her parents' house. She loved the music of the 1960s and was a big fan of John Lennon and Yoko Ono. In her youth, Rist had seen many music films, such as Yellow Submarine, Magical Mystery Tour and films about Bob Dylan. These television experiences shaped her artistic background in the 1980s. During her studies in Vienna, she had access to music from New York and London through fellow students from Vorarlberg, mixing rock with punk.

From 1988 to 1994, Pipilotti Rist was a member of the music band and performance group Les Reines Prochaines, with which she also released several records and who are still active in the 2020s. She created stage designs for fellow rock bands. In 1995, she began working with Anders Guggisberg, with whom she produced the music for many of her works, such as Ever Is Over All (1997).

== Career ==
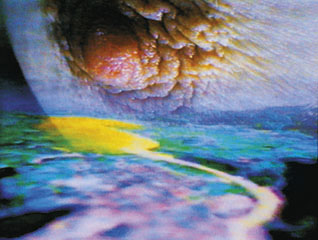
Pickelporno (Film still, 1986)

In the early 1990s, Rist attracted the attention of the art world for the first time. She achieved notoriety with Pickelporno (Pimple porno) (1992), a work about the female body and sexual excitation. The fisheye camera moves over the bodies of a couple. The images are charged by intense colors, and are simultaneously strange, sensual, and ambiguous. Frieze describe the work: "The video treats sex as a scenic landscape from the inside out, rather than putting the viewer into the passive position, recalling film theorist Laura Mulvey’s essay on narrative pleasure and feminist viewership (Visual Pleasures and Narrative Cinema, 1975)."

Rist's nine video segments titled Open My Glade were played once every hour on a screen at Times Square in New York City, a project of the Messages to the Public program, which was founded in 1980.

Pour Your Body Out was a commissioned multimedia installation organized by Klaus Biesenbach and installed in the atrium of the Museum of Modern Art in early 2009. In an interview with Phong Bui published in The Brooklyn Rail, Rist said she chose the atrium for the installation "because it reminds me of a church's interior where you’re constantly reminded that the spirit is good and the body is bad. This spirit goes up in space but the body remains on the ground. This piece is really about bringing those two differences together."

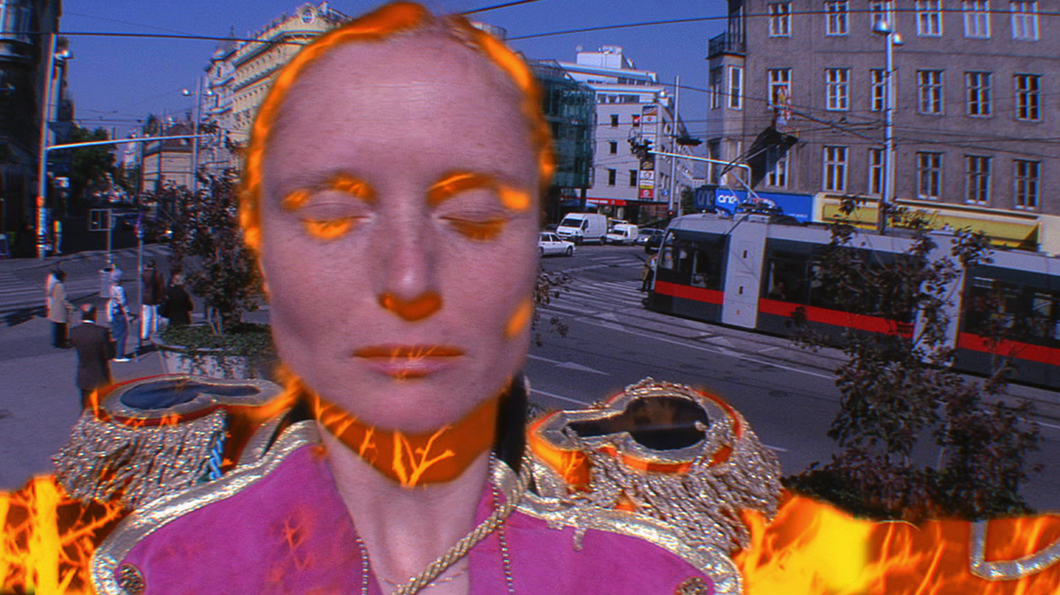
Pepperminta (Film still, 2009)

Rist's first feature film, Pepperminta, had its world premiere at the 66th Venice International Film Festival in 2009. She summarised the plot as "a young woman and her friends on a quest to find the right color combinations and with these colors they can free other people from fear and make life better.”

== Classification and interpretation ==
Rist built on the approaches of Nam June Paik, whose 1963 exhibition Exposition of Music – Electronic Television was the starting point for video art. Paik understood images, television quotes, music and sound, technical interference and viewer participation as art elements and used them in his work.

Besides that, Gloria Sutton sees Rist's site-specific installations such as Stadtlounge or Hand Me Your Trust in the tradition of medieval churches, dioramas from the seventeenth century, panoramas from the eighteenth century and planetariums from the twentieth. In addition, Fluxus events offered the audience the opportunity to feel part of the artwork. Sutton also sees connections to filmmaker Stan Vanderbeek's theories on Expanded Cinema.

While, according to Sutton, a misogynistic tendency was noticeable in the actions of artists such as Hermann Nitsch, Otto Muehl or Günter Brus from the early and mid-1960s, Rist's videos gave a lot of space to female protagonists. Scenes with naked bodies distracted from the technical precision of the image and sound level. Rist's visual language deliberately broke with taboos that intimidated people, using menstrual blood (Blutclip, 1993) and semen, for example.

The presentation of female bodies and the treatment of topics such as menstruation have led to Rist often being described as a feminist. The artist herself commented on this: "I am a feminist, that is a matter of honour, and logical, as long as the horizons are not equally broad for everyone." Rist strives for lightheartedness and humour rather than sentimentality, which she sees as a form of complacency: "For me, being a feminist means being aware that we women have a completely different history to men. It means that in my life – in my art – I strive for a more autonomous identity that is less defined by the opposite sex, but I am not a fan of the whiny feminist tone."

There is a distinguation to be made between the artist and her art: Some art reviewers have also seen the depiction of female bodies and menstrual blood as arguments for a characterisation of Rist's art as 'feminist', as well as a tendency towards video art as a medium favoured by women. Details such as handbags or make-up bags are repeatedly subjects of Rist's work (for example in the installation Schminktischlein mit Feedback,1993), though in artistic deformation. According to Kampmann, these details lead to the superficial conclusion to view the artist within a feminist context. Particularly Ever Is Over All is repeatedly read as a feminist piece of art. However, other voices argue that interpreting Rist’s art "against the backdrop of feminist thought […] is too one-dimensional and thus problematic."

The artist herself explicitly rejects the labeling of her art as feminist. In her eyes, there is no such thing as feminist art: when she films a female body, she is very often concerned with the human body itself. In the german daily newspaper Frankfurter Rundschau, Rist warned against taking feminism too far. She argued that constantly fighting for one's own rights could lead to egotism. Rist rather emphasizes that video is not a neutral technology. That is why feminism in her work is not merely reflected in her focus on the female body. Rather, she reveals that this technology is usually strongly geared towards reproducing the characteristics of gender and race, and is therefore embedded in society. As a pioneer in the use of media—particularly video and film—the artist has developed her own distinctive style beyond these labels, as David Neuman, the director of Magasin 3 Stockholm Konsthall, pointed out in the prologue to the 2007 catalogue accompanying Rist's exhibition Gravity, be my friend.

== Personal life ==
Rist lives and works in Zurich, Switzerland with her partner Balz Roth, an entrepreneur. The couple has a son, Himalaya.

From summer 2012 through to summer 2013, Rist spent a sabbatical in Somerset.

== Collections ==
Pipilotti Rist's works are represented in contemporary art collections of established Museums worldwide, including the Museum of Modern Art, the Solomon R. Guggenheim Museum, the San Francisco MoMA, Louisiana Museum of Modern Art Humlebaek (Denmark), Kyoto National Museum (Japan), Utrecht Centraal Museum (Netherlands), the Kunstmuseum Basel, Museum of Contemporary Art Chicago, Museum für Moderne Kunst Frankfurt am Main (Germany), the Musée d'Art et d'Histoire (Geneva), and the Migros Museum of Contemporary Art (Zurich). Her installation, TV-Lüster, is on permanent display at the Kunstmuseum St. Gallen.

== Influence on other artists ==
Ever Is Over All was referenced in 2016 by Beyoncé in the film accompanying her album Lemonade in which the singer is seen walking down a city street smashing windows of parked cars with a baseball bat.

== Works ==
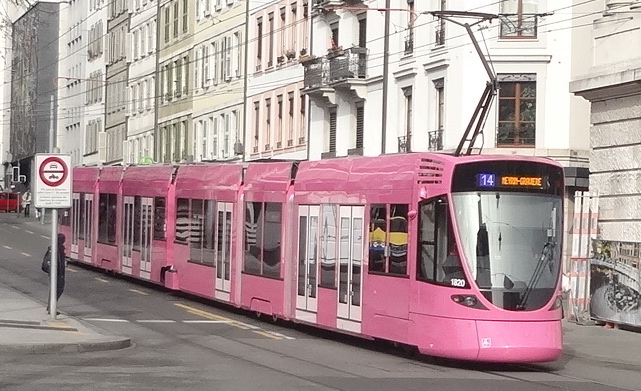
Cable car Monochrome Rose, Geneva, since 2016

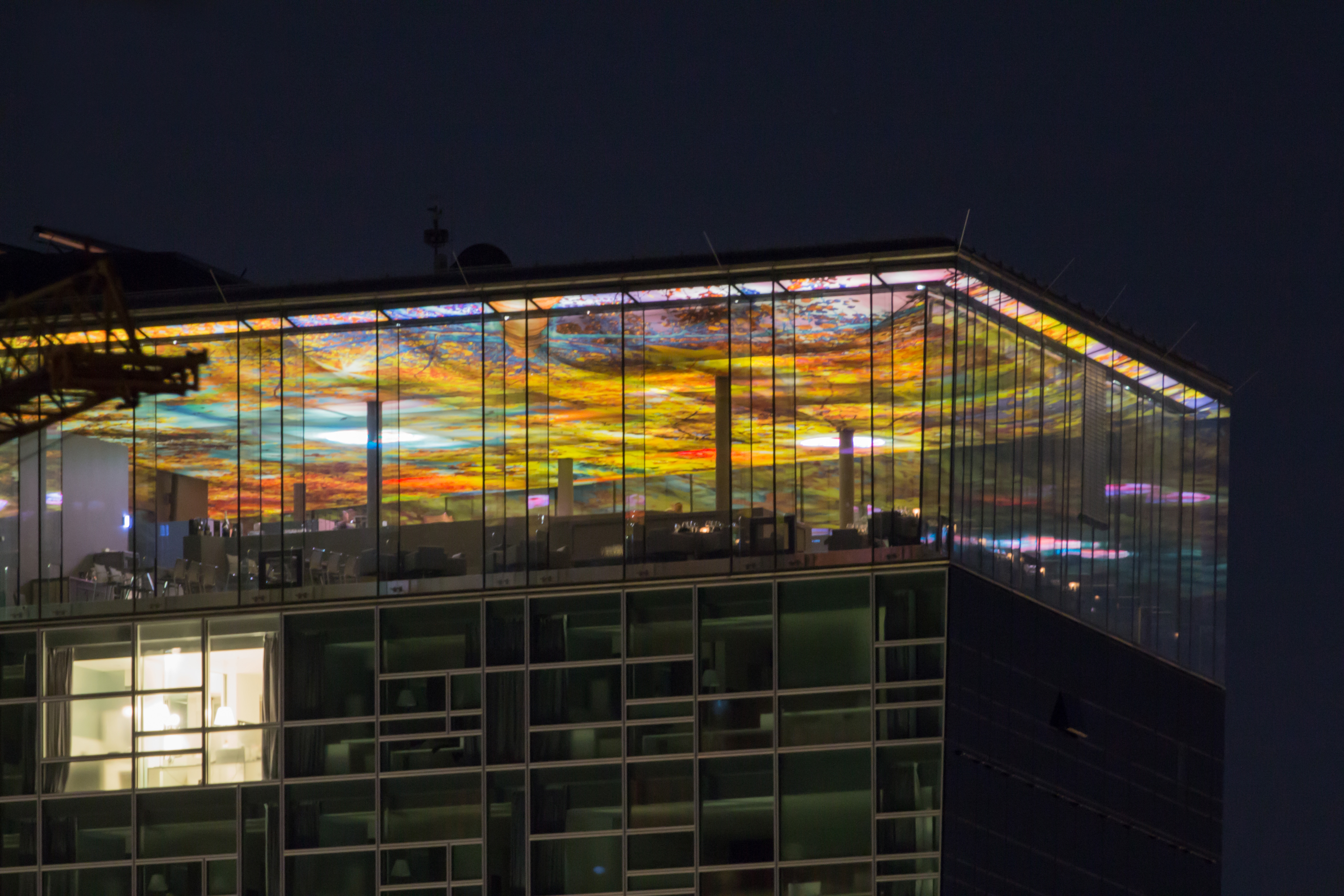
Ceiling installation at Le Loft – Nouvel-Tower, Vienna

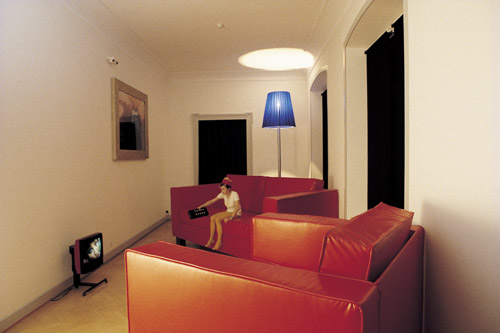
The Room/Das Zimmer (Film still, Kunsthalle Sankt Gallen 1994/2000)

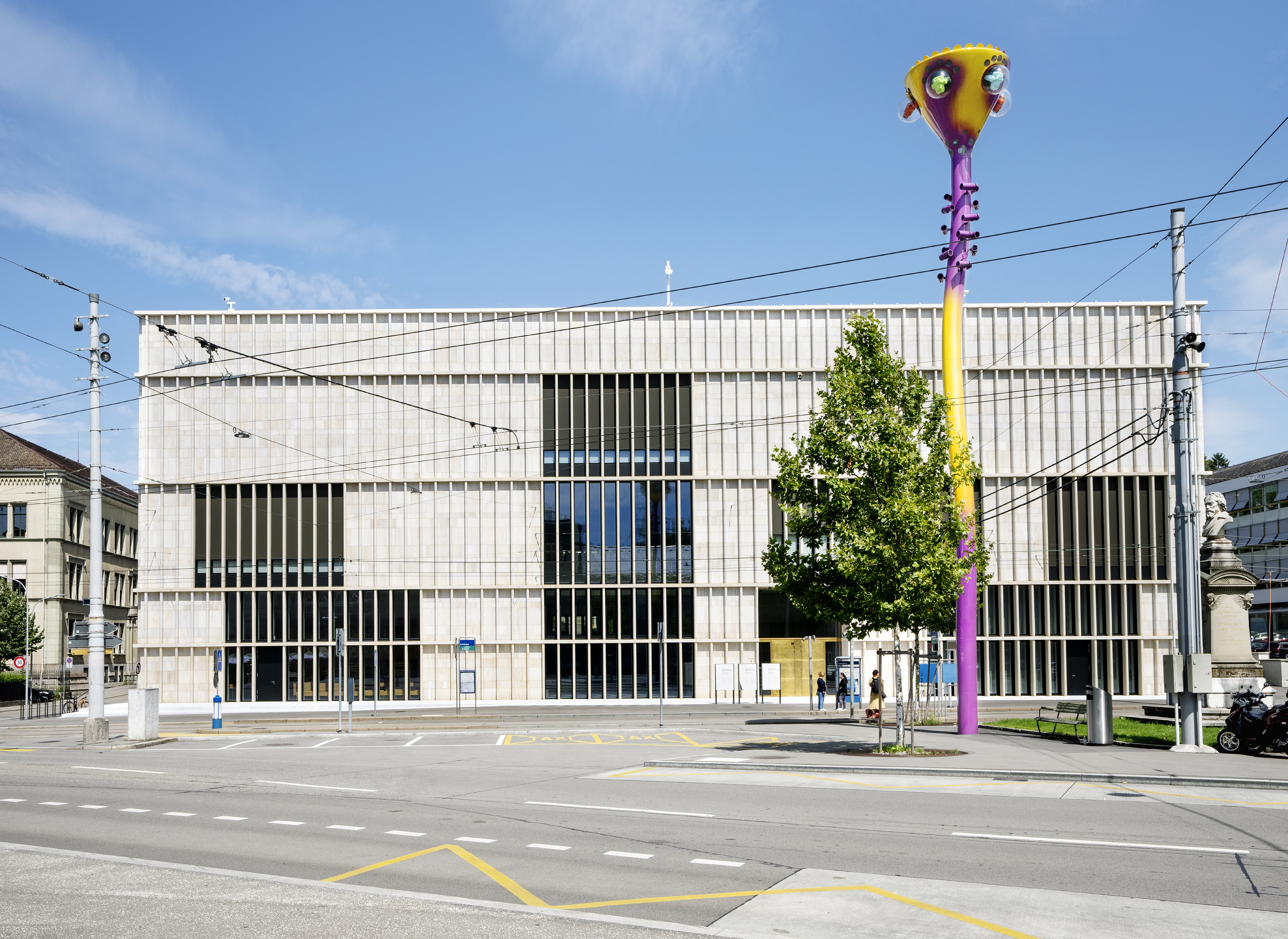
Video installation Tastende Lichter (Inching Lights), façade of Kunsthaus Zürich

=== Architectural Art and Public Art ===
- since 1995: Flying Room. Video projection on the ceiling of the UBS entrance hall, Buchs, St. Gallen
- 2000 and 2017: Open my Glade. Video installation on Times Square, New York
- since 2001: Ein Blatt im Wind (A Leaf in the Wind). Swiss Embassy Berlin, Germany
- since 2005: Stadtlounge (City lounge). Square and street design in St. Gallen, cooperation with Carlos Martinez
- since 2010: Ceiling installation in the restaurant Le Loft on 18th floor of the Sofitel Hotel (Nouvel Tower), Vienna
- since 2014: Münsteranerin. Permanent video installation in the entrance area of the Museum für Kunst und Kultur in Münster, Germany
- since 2016: Monochrome Rose. Streetcar train in pink, Geneva
- since 2020: Tastende Lichter (Inching lights). Permanent video installation on the façade of Kunsthaus Zürich

=== Audio and Video art ===
- 1986: I’m Not The Girl Who Misses Much
- 1988: Das Zimmer (1994/2000)(Entlastungen) Pipilottis Fehler
- 1992/1999: Eine Spitze in den Westen – ein Blick in den Osten (bzw. N-S) (A Peek Into The West – A Look Into The East)
- 1992: Pickelporno
- 1993: Blutraum (Blood room)
- 1993: Eindrücke verdauen (Digesting Impressions)
- 1993: Schminktischlein mit Feedback (Little Make-Up Table With Feedback)
- 1993: TV-Lüster
- 1994/99: Cintia
- 1994/2000/2007: Das Zimmer (The Room)
- 1994: Selbstlos im Lavabad
- 1994: Yoghurt On Skin – Velvet On TV
- 1995: Search Wolken / Suche Clouds (elektronischer Heiratsantrag) (Search Wolken / Such Clouds (Electronic Marriage Proposal))
- 1996: Sip My Ocean (Schlürfe meinen Ozean)
- 1997: Ever Is Over All
- 1998: Blauer Leibesbrief (Blue Bodily Lettre)
- 1999/2001, 2007, 2009: Kleines Vorstadthirn (Small Suburb Brain)
- 1999: Himalaya Goldsteins Stube (Himalaya Goldstein’s Living Room)
- 2000: Öffne meine Lichtung (Open my Glade (Flatten))
- 2000: Himalaya’s Sister’s Living Room
- 2000: Peeping Freedom Shutters for Olga Shapir
- 2000/2001: Supersubjektiv (Super Subjective)
- 2001/2005: Wach auf (Despierta)
- 2001: Expecting
- 2002: Der Kuchen steht in Flammen (The Cake is in Flames)
- 2003: Apfelbaum unschuldig auf dem Diamantenhügel (Apple Tree Innocent On Diamond Hill) (Manzano inocente en la colina de diamantes)
- 2004: Herz aufwühlen Herz ausspülen (Stir Heart Rinse Heart)
- 2005: Eine Freiheitsstatue für Löndön (A Liberty Statue for Löndön)
- 2005: Homo Sapiens Sapiens
- 2006: Celle selbst zu zweit, by Gutararist aka Gudrun Gut & Pipilotti Rist
- 2007: Ginas Mobile (Gina’s Mobile)
- 2008: Erleuchte (und kläre) meinen Raum (Enlight My Space )
- 2011: Cape Cod Chandelier
- 2014: Worry Will Vanish Horizon
- 2015: Wir verwurzeln (Seelenfarben)
- 2016: Pixelwald
- 2016: 4th Floor To Mildness
- 2017: Caressing Dinner Circle (Tender Roundelay Family) 5er table
- 2018: Sparkling Pond, Bold-Coloured Groove & Tender Fire (Please Walk In And Let The Colors Caress You)
- 2020: Fritzflasche (The Bottle of Fritz)
- 2023: Hand Me Your Trust

=== Feature Film ===
- 2009: Pepperminta

== Recognition ==
- 1997 – Renta Preis of the Kunsthalle Nürnberg
- 1998 – Nomination for the Hugo Boss Prize
- 1999 – Wolfgang Hahn Prize
- 2003 – Honorary Professorship from Berlin University of the Arts
- 2006 – Guggenheim Museums Young Collector's Council Annual Artist's Ball honouring Pipilotti Rist
- 2007 – St. Galler Kulturpreis der St. Gallischen Kulturstiftung
- 2009 – Special Award, Seville European Film Festival
- 2009 – Joan Miró Prize, Barcelona
- 2009 – Best Exhibition Of Digital, Video, or Film: "Pour Your Body Out (7354 Cubic Meters)" at Museum of Modern Art, New York. 26th annual awards, The International Association of Art Critics (AICA)
- 2010 – Cutting the Edge Award, Miami International Film Festival
- 2011 – Best Architects '11 Award
- 2012 – Bazaar Art, International Artist of the Year, Hong Kong, China
- 2013 – Zurich Festival Prize, Zürcher Festpiele
- 2014 – Baukoma Awards for Marketing and Architecture, Best Site Development
- 2021 – Elected Honorary Royal Academician (HonRA) on 9 September 2021
- 2024 – Culture Prize of the Canton of Zürich
- 2027 – Eugene McDermott Award in the Arts, Massachusetts Institute of Technology to be awarded April 8, 2027

== Exhibitions ==
| Year | Title | Institution | Location | Ref |
|---|---|---|---|---|
| 2023 | Prickling Goosebumps & a Humming Horizon | Hauser & Wirth | Chelsea, New York | |
| 2023 | Prickling Goosebumps & a Humming Horizon | Luhring Augustin | Chelsea, New York | |
