= Brandon Lattu =

American artist

Brandon Lattu is an American contemporary artist living and working in Los Angeles.

== Early life ==
Lattu was born in Athens, Georgia in 1970. In 1993 he attended Yale Norfolk and obtained a BFA from Corcoran School of Art, Washington, DC in 1994. He attended UCLA and graduated with an MFA in 1998.

== Career ==
Lattu's work has been shown and collected by a variety of institutions such as the Metropolitan Museum of Art, New York; Stedelijk Museum, Amsterdam, Netherlands; VOX Contemporary Image Center, Montreal, Canada; California Museum of Photography, Riverside, California; and The Mak Center, Los Angeles, California. Jan Tumlir in an Artforum review of Lattu's 2019 show Full to Bursting writes Lattu "speaks to the current representational excess that swells the frames of pictures and inexorably pushes out into reality."

Lattu currently teaches art, photography, and digital imaging at the University of California, Riverside.

== Selected solo exhibitions ==
- Empirical, Textual, Contextual, California Museum of Photography, Riverside, US (2021)
- Full to Bursting, Richard Telles Fine Art, Los Angeles, US (2019)
- Not Human, Koenig and Clinton, New York, US (2013)
- Reciprocity of Light, The Mak Center, Los Angeles (2010)
- 3 Models, Monte Clark Gallery, Vancouver, Canada (2007)
- 4 Models, Leo Koenig Inc, New York, US (2007)
- Jenseits des Physisch Möglichen, Kunstverein in Bielefeld, Germany (2007)

== Selected group exhibitions ==
- Everyday Epiphanies: Photography and Daily Life Since 1969, Metropolitan Museum of Art, New York, US (2013)
- Walker Evans and the Barn, Stedelijk Museum, Amsterdam, Netherlands (2010)
- How Many Billboards? Art in Stead, The Mak Center, Los Angeles (2010)
- Tractatus Logico-Catalogicus, VOX Contemporary Image Center, Montreal, Canada (2008)
- Attention to Detail, Flag Art Foundation, New York, US (2008)
- Big City Lab, Art Forum Berlin, Germany (2006)
- Photography 2005, Victoria Miro Gallery, London, UK (2005)
- Brandon Lattu, Scott Lyall, Corey McCorkle, Mary Goldman Gallery, Los Angeles, US (2003)
