= Michael Corris =

American art historian

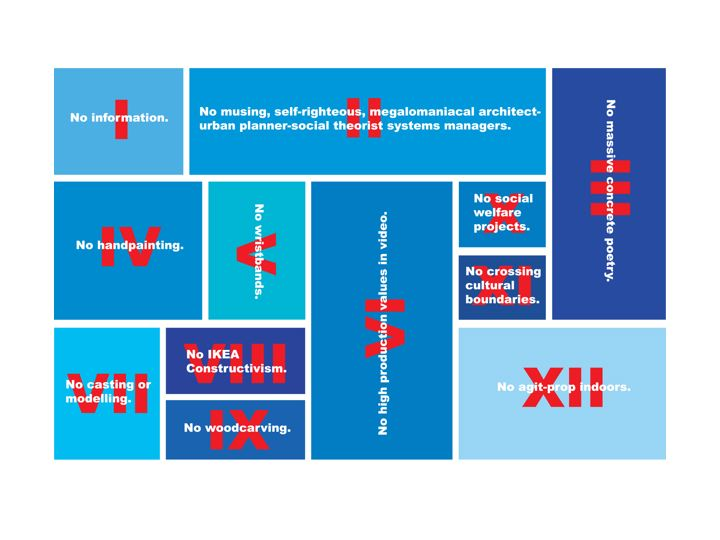
An artwork by Corris from 2005

Michael Corris is an artist, art historian and author. He is professor emeritus of art at the Meadows School of the Arts, Southern Methodist University, Dallas, Texas, United States. Previously, Corris held the post of Professor of Fine Art at the Art and Design Research Center, Sheffield Hallam University (Sheffield, United Kingdom). From 2005-6, he was a Visiting Professor of Art Theory at the Bergen Art Academy (Bergen, Norway).

== Life and career ==
Corris received his baccalaureate and master's degrees in the United States, studying studio art and art history at Brooklyn College under Harry Holtzman, Jimmy Ernst, Walter Rosenblum, Sylvia Stone, Philip Pearlstein and Carl Holty; and later, painting and art theory at the Hoffberger School of Painting, Maryland Institute College of Art under Grace Hartigan and the poet, Emmanuel Navaretta. In 1970, Corris was awarded a scholarship to attend the prestigious summer program in art at the Skowhegan School of Painting and Sculpture, where he had contact with Kenneth Noland, Jacob Lawrence, Brice Marden and David Diao. For his research on the work of Ad Reinhardt, Corris was awarded a PhD in the history of art in 1996 by University College London.

Corris began working in late-1971 with the Conceptual art group, Art & Language, in New York; his work was published in 1973 in the group’s journal, Art-Language. With Mel Ramsden, Ian Burn, Joseph Kosuth, Sarah Charlesworth and others, Corris was a founding editor of The Fox; an artists-run journal that addressed the political and social dimensions of contemporary artistic practice.

Following the dissolution of Art & Language in New York in late 1976, Corris continued to pursue his artistic practice, dividing his energies between the production of artist's books inspired by typographic design and lecturing and writing on contemporary art and art theory. As a member of Art & Language and as an individual artist, Corris's work has been widely exhibited internationally and is part of the permanent collection of, among others, the Museum of Modern Art (New York City), the Whitney Museum of American Art (New York City), the Victoria and Albert Museum(London), Le Consortium (Dijon) and the J. P. Getty Museum (Los Angeles).

Corris lectures and publishes on the subject of late-modern and contemporary art . Corris’s art criticism has been widely published in journals and magazines devoted to modern and contemporary art, such as Art Monthly, Artforum, FlashArt, Art History, art+text and Mute. In addition, his critical writings have been included in several collections, most notably Alex Alberro and Blake Stimson (eds), Conceptual Art: A Critical Anthology (MIT Press) and John Roberts (ed), Art Has No History! (Verso Press).

Corris's most recent publications include: Conceptual Art: Theory, Myth and Practice (Cambridge University Press, 2004), monographs on David Diao (TimeZone8 Books, Beijing, 2005) and Ad Reinhardt (Reaktion Books, London, 2008), Non-Relational Aesthetics (Artwords Press, 2008)(with Dr Charlie Gere), and Art, Word and Image: 2,000 Years of Visual/Textual Interaction (Reaktion Books, London, 2010)(with John Dixon Hunt and David Lomas).

In an October 2008 interview with Joan Waltemath published in The Brooklyn Rail, Corris discusses his book, Ad Reinhardt, which was an extension of his doctoral work, investigating the artist's relationship to the American Communist movement and focusing "on the period 1935-1950 in Reinhardt’s life, detailing his relationship to the politics of the left and providing the first comprehensive survey of his political illustrations and cartoons for publications like New Masses and Soviet Russia Today."

In April, 2010, Corris founded the Free Museum of Dallas; a project and exhibition space that occupied the Chairperson's office at SMU (2010-2014) . Corris was Reviews Editor for the College Art Association publication, Art Journal (2013-2016) and is presently series editor for "Art since the '80s", Reaktion Books, London. A selection of his writings on art is published by Les Presses du Réel (Dijon), 2016. <https://www.lespressesdureel.com/EN/ouvrage.php?id=4893&menu=1>

== Other Resources ==
- Michael Corris papers of the Art & Language New York group, 1965-2002, Getty Research Institute, Los Angeles, Accession No. 2003.M.32. The collection documents the activities of the conceptual art group Art & Language New York.
