= Anna Craycroft =

American conceptual artist

Anna Craycroft (born 1975) is an American conceptual artist who works with a variety of media, including sculpture, installation, intervention and public engagement. Craycroft was born in Eugene, Oregon. She earned her BA from the Slade School of Fine Art and her MFA from Columbia University School of the Arts.

== Public sculpture ==
Craycroft has created public sculptures for:

- the Socrates Sculpture Park (2004),
- the Lower Manhattan Cultural Center (2005),
- Art in General (2006), New York, and
- Den Haag Sculptuur, The Hague (2008).

== Collections ==
Her work is included in the permanent collection of the Whitney Museum of American Art.
