= Les Reines Prochaines =

- Origin: Switzerland
- Genres: Pop; cabaret
- Years active: 1987–present
- Members: Muda Mathis; Sus Zwick; Fränzi Madörin; Michèle Fuchs
- Past members: Teresa Alonso; Barbara Naegelin; Pipilotti Rist
- Website: reinesprochaines.ch

Les Reines Prochaines (in French, "the Next Queens") are a collectively organised pop band and performance group based in Basel, Switzerland. Their highly lyrical songs are rooted in various genres, including tango, folk, and classical music.

== History ==
Les Reines Prochaines were founded in 1987 as Les Reines des Couteaux (in French, "The Queens of the Knives") by Teresa Alonso, Regina Florida Schmid, and Muda Mathis; in the following year, they were joined by Fränzi Madörin and Pipilotti Rist. Years later, Gabi Streiff, Sus Zwick, Sibylle Hauert, Michèle Fuchs, and Barbara Naegelin joined as well.

Touring members have included percussionist Dave Kerman, who also appeared on their 2013 release Blut.

In 2019 they were honoured with the Swiss Music Award.

== Musical style ==
The group started as a synth-only band (aside from their voices). At present the musicians (of whom several are also visual artists) play bass, drums, accordion, guitar, clarinet, trompette, and flute. In spite of this their arrangements are quite minimalistic, incorporated into a larger multimedia framework. Their lyrics are poetic and political, and often quite provocative. In their performances, each musician has a unique role; instruments are traded, and the format shifts between song, dance, and spoken word.

Their repertoire includes a number of cover songs, including Opfer dieses Liedes (from Chris Isaak's Wicked Game) and Evening, a sparse cover of the Rolling Stones' As Tears Go By.

== Concerts on tour ==
- 1987: Engel haben nie weit, Opera and Concertprogram, Les Reines des Couteaux: Regina Florida Schmid, Teresa Alonso, Muda Mathis
- 1988/89: Zorniges Lamm, multimedia performance, open air in the Bassin of the old Stückfärberei, Basel and concert programme, Les Reines Prochaines: Teresa Alonso, Fränzi Madörin, Muda Mathis, Regina Florida Schmid, Pipilotti Rist
- 1989: Die Tempodrosslerin saust, with: Teresa Alonso, Fränzi Madörin, Muda Mathis, Regina Florida Schmid, Pipilotti Rist, technician: Roli Frei
- 1990/9: Seien sie Flugdame!, with: Fränzi Madörin, Muda Mathis, Regina Florida Schmid, Gabi Streiff, Pipilotti Rist, technician: Sus Zwick
- 1991/92: Komm mit mir auf's Floss, with: Muda Mathis, Fränzi Madörin, Piplotti Rist, Gabi Streiff, technician: Sus Zwick
- 1993/94: Lob Ehre Ruhm Dank, with: Muda Mathis, Fränzi Madörin, Piplotti Rist, Gabi Streiff, technician: Sus Zwick
- 1994/95: Les Reines Prochaines wollen ihre Welt vergrössern, with: Sibylle Hauert, Fränzi Madörin, Muda Mathis, Gaby Streiff, technician: Sus Zwick
- 1995/96: Le coeur en beurre doublegras, with: Sibylle Hauert, Fränzi Madörin, Muda Mathis, Gaby Streiff, technician: Sus Zwick
- 1997: Sandale Haus Pfirsich Brot, performance on tour, by and with Sibylle Hauert, Fränzi Madörin, Muda Mathis, Sus Zwick
- 1998/99: Les Reines Prochaines gehen in die Tiefe, with: Michèle Fuchs, Fränzi Madörin, Muda Mathis, Sus Zwick, Technik: Barbara Naegelin
- 2000/01: Das schlaue Mammut tobt oder die sieben Stufen des Glücks, with: Michèle Fuchs, Fränzi Madörin, Muda Mathis, Sus Zwick together with Nathalie Persillier & Lily Besily, anyaffair Sibylle Hauert, Daniel Reichmuth, technician: Barbara Naegelin
- 2002/03: Es gibt immer was zu tun – Protest und Vasen, with: Michèle Fuchs, Fränzi Madörin, Muda Mathis, Barbara Naegelin, Sus Zwick, technician: Tina Z'Rotz
- 2004/05/06: Halluzination, with: Michèle Fuchs, Fränzi Madörin, Muda Mathis, Barbara Naegelin, Sus Zwick, audio technology and set Tina Z'Rotz
- 2006/07/08: Fest der Organe, with: Michèle Fuchs, Fränzi Madörin, Muda Mathis, Barbara Naegelin, Sus Zwick
- 2009/10/11: Vol d’art – der Kunstraub, with: Michèle Fuchs, Fränzi Madörin, Muda Mathis, Sus Zwick
- 2013/14/15: Blut – Syrup Of Life, with: Michèle Fuchs, Fränzi Madörin, Muda Mathis und Sus Zwick
- 2015/16/17: Fremde Torten im falschen Paradies, with: Michèle Fuchs, Fränzi Madörin, Muda Mathis und Sus Zwick
- 2018/19/20/21/22: Schildkrötenritt, with: Fränzi Madörin, Muda Mathis, Sus Zwick
- 2022/2023: Rubination, with: Fränzi Madörin, Muda Mathis, Sus Zwick
- 2023: Late-Night zum Ring-Festival with: Marcel Schwald, Jonas Gillmann and Les Reines Prochaines, Theatre Basel

== Discography ==
- 1990: Jawohl, sie kann's. Sie hat's geschafft. (Yes, she can do it. She's done it), (LP/CD)
- 1993: Lob Ehre Ruhm. (Praise Honor Glory), (LP/CD)
- 1995: Le coeur en beurre double gras (The heart in double cream butter), (CD)
- 1999: Alberta (CD)
- 2003: Protest und Vasen. (Protest and Vases), (CD)
- 2005: Starke Kränze. (Strong wreaths), (CD)
- 2013: Blut. (Blood), (CD)
- 2017: Schlafen ist individuelle Anarchie. (Sleeping is individual anarchy), (limited vinyl single LRP009)
- 2020: Zu unserer Verfassung. (To our constitution), (CD)
- 2021: Let's sing Arbeiterin*! . (Let's sing workin woman*!), (CD)
- 2024: Scissor*hood, Album unrecord

== Film ==
- Claudia Willke. Les Reines Prochaines – Alleine denken ist kriminell. Documentary DE/CH, 2012, 77 minutes.
