= Renée Green =

American artist, writer, and filmmaker (born 1959)

- Born: October 25, 1959 (age 67); Cleveland, Ohio, U.S.
- Education: School of Visual Arts; Harvard University; Wesleyan University
- Occupations: Artist, writer, and filmmaker
- Known for: Art, film, writing

Renée Green (born October 25, 1959) is an American artist, writer, and filmmaker. Her pluralistic practice spans a broad range of media, including sculpture, architecture, photography, prints, video, film, websites, and sound, which normally converge in highly layered and complex installations. She works to draw on cultural anthropology as well as social history, making her works well-researched and many times involving collaborators. Some of the topics she has covered include Sarah Baartman, the African slave trade, and hip hop in Germany.

In 2014, Green published Other Planes of There: Selected Writings with Duke University Press, a work that compiles a substantial collection of her work written between 1981 and 2010.

== Early life and education ==
Green studied art at Wesleyan University, with an intermediary year at the School of Visual Arts in New York. Green also attended the Radcliffe Publishing Procedures Course at Harvard University, Cambridge, Massachusetts. In 1989 she was a participant in the Whitney Museum of American Art Independent Study Program (ISP).

Green wrote Discourse on Afro-American Art as her graduating thesis from Wesleyan University, a "textual analysis of criticisms, which were written by both Black and White critics from the 1920s and the 1960s." A seminal influence was Green's participation in cataloging Sol LeWitt's donated collection to Wadsworth Atheneum. Green wrote the catalog entries for Adrian Piper, and Lawrence Weiner.

Her brother is Derrick Green, frontman of the Brazilian heavy metal band Sepultura.

== Work ==
Color I (1990) at the National Gallery of Art in 2022

Green's work adopts the form of complex and highly formalized installations in which ideas, historical events and narratives, as well as cultural artifacts, are examined from myriad perspectives. Green's work investigates the shifts and gaps in what lives in private and public impressions as well as what has been envisioned and formulated. Her videos, exhibitions, and films have been presented and viewed in biennales, museums, and festivals across the world. As scholar Alexander Alberro notes, Green's attempt is not a didactic one, rather an invitation to participate in the construction of knowledge, as well as shifting perception: "Green consistently gives the spectator a central role in the process of deconstructing genealogical discourses and assuming subject positions. Indeed, a feature that recurs in her installations is the production of interactive environments that galvanize the viewer into the role of an equal participant in the construction of meaning."

Green explains in her own words the impetus behind this activity of collecting and exhibiting different data and materials: "I wanted to begin by examining an artifact, a text, a painting or a group of paintings, a decorative object, an image, a novel, a poem, a garden, a palace, a house. By beginning with these objects or places, and the contexts in which they appeared, it was possible to detect the intricate working of certain ideologies which were being put forth [...] and to attempt to decipher the contradictory pleasure which might accompany them."

In 1992, Green collaborated with the Fabric Workshop in Philadelphia to create Mise-en-Scene: Commemorative Toile. This work encapsulates her use of appropriation to reevaluate history and claim attention to its type of presentation. In order to produce this work, Green incorporated “traditional bucolic scenes typical of eighteenth-century upholstery fabric with violent scenes of enslavement and uprisings. Benign floral garlands frame images of the lynching of a Frenchman during the Haitian revolution and of an enchained and unclothed black man kneeling by the desk of a sumptuously dressed white man. Using this fabric, Green constructs installations reminiscent of museum period rooms, with chairs, settees, drapes, and wallpaper crafted from the pinkish-red toile. She subverts the toile and period room as historical types to tell alternative histories.”

A lot of the materials collected for her projects come from the immense repository already in existence in our culture, but her work can not be considered as a mere assemblage of cultural artifacts, nor an appropriationist practice. In each of her projects, Green produces works of art in different mediums like photography [Secret (1994–2006)], prints [Code: Survey], films [Some Chance Operations (1999); Wavelinks (2002), Elsewhere? (2002], and sound [Vanished Gardens (2004), Muriel's Words (2004)], which are integrated in highly designed installations or environments. Due to the selective accumulation of materials Green's work has been labeled in some instances as archival.

As a result of the complex web of relations and conceptual links among the materials and projects, these normally take place during a duration of time, and in different locations, in which the same theme is presented in different formats. For example, Import/Export Funk Office (1992), was presented as an installation in Cologne and Los Angeles, and exists also as Cd-Rom (1996); or Code: Survey (2005–2006) takes the form of a permanent public work installed at the Caltrans Headquarters in Downtown Los Angeles, and as a website, which can be accessed worldwide.

Due to the density and formal complexity of her different projects, Green uses the standard catalogue published alongside her exhibitions, as a part of her work. These books function in a variety of levels: as an exhibition catalogue, as an artist's book, as a repository of documents, as transcripts of conversations and scripts of the films and videos produced for the different projects.

In 1997 Green was chosen by the American Federation of the Arts to design Artist/Author: Contemporary Artist's Books.

Green has also written extensively, and her work has been published in different publications from United States and Europe. Among the publications are October, Texte zur Kunst, Transition, Sarai Reader, Multitudes, and Collapse.

Indeed, Renée Green's video works tend to be more formally subtle. Her video, Climates and Paradoxes (2005), considers the centenary of Albert Einstein's theory of relativity via an excavation of the history of a high-rise apartment building in Berlin that Green once lived in and that occupies the former site of the pacifist organization Bund Neues Vaterland, of which, the video's associative narration informs us, Einstein was the twenty-ninth member. Walking in NYL (2016), follows from Green's long-standing interest in Lisbon and the broader Portuguese sphere of influence.

Since her arrival at MIT in 2011, Green has had numerous solo exhibitions, including: Lumiar Cité, Lisbon; Museum of Modern Art, New York; MAK Center for Art and Architecture at the Schindler House, Los Angeles; Fondazione Antonio Ratti, Como, Italy; Galerie Nagel Draxler, Berlin; Carpenter Center for Visual Arts, Harvard University, Cambridge, MA; and Prefix Institute for Contemporary Art, Toronto. She has also been involved in many group exhibitions: Hammer Museum, and Museum of Contemporary Art, both in Los Angeles; Whitney Museum, New Museum, and the Studio Museum in Harlem, New York; Museum of Contemporary Art, Chicago; Walker Art Center, Minneapolis; Museum Moderner Kunst, Vienna; Institute of Contemporary Art, Philadelphia; Museum der Moderner, Salzburg; Centro Andaluz de Arte Contemporáneo, Seville; and numerous others.

Green has assembled numerous books and writings over the years, including: Other Planes of There: Selected Writings (2014), published by Duke University Press; Endless Dreams and Time-Based Streams (2010), produced in the Yerba Buena Center for the Arts, San Francisco; Ongoing Becomings (2009) represents 20 years of Green's work, and was organized by the Musée Cantonal des Beaux-Arts, Lausanne; Negotiations in the Contact Zone (2003); Between and Including (2001); Shadows and Signals (2000); Artist/Author: Contemporary Artists’ Books; Certain Miscellanies: Some Documents (1996); After the Ten Thousand Things (1994); Camino Road (1994); and World Tour (1993).

Green has also submitted many published essays and fictions in magazines and journals, including: Transition; October; Frieze; Texte zur Kunst; Spex; Multitudes; Sarai Reader; Collapse; among other magazines and journals, and an assortment of international cultural and scholarly books.

=== Projects ===
A brief description of selected projects by Green.

Green reflected on the historical display of black women's bodies in a number of her early artworks, above all the display of the "Hottentot Venus": Sarah Baartman, a South African woman exhibited as a sideshow in London and then Paris in the early Nineteenth Century, and who was thought at the time to be of the "Hottentot" tribe. Three of these artworks, Permitted (1989), Sa Main Charmante (1989), and Seen (1990) were shown together at Green's 1990 Anatomies of Escape exhibition, held at the P.S. 1 Contemporary Art Center's Clocktower Gallery.

Permitted (1989). This artwork, one of the first in which Green combined texts and images, attempted to evoke the position of early nineteenth-century audiences vis-a-vis bodies put on display. Green enlarged an engraving of Sarah Baartman's body to life-size and overlaid it with wooden slats stamped with Sir Francis Galton's description of measuring the buttocks of a "Hottentot" woman. Green highlighted the simultaneously "objective" and "subjective" character of this text by signaling each element with distinct typefaces, either capitalized Times Roman or cursive script. The artwork also involved a peephole through which viewers could see an image of Baartman standing on a crate, therefore aligning this kind of sideshow with pornography.

Sa Main Charmante (Her Charming Hand, 1989). The central features of this artwork are a soapbox marked with two footprints and placed in front of a wall-mounted, ladder-like construction whose slats are stamped with two texts describing Sarah Baartman. These texts, one describing Baartman's performance as the Hottentot Venus, and the other written by Georges Cuvier after his postmortem dissection of Baartman, are interspersed and thus interrupt and disrupt one another. Cuvier's text provides the title for the work: though he aligned Baartman with animals, he also noted "her charming hand." The soapbox and slatted structure are flanked by a klieg light and a peepbox containing a reproduction of an early nineteenth-century French print showing European viewers ogling the "Hottentot Venus." The klieg light simultaneously provides the light for this print and spotlights the viewer peeking into the box, highlighting their complicity in such degrading displays.

Seen (1990). This artwork builds on several features of Sa Main Charmante: it uses interspersed texts that reference the sideshow/stage entrance of Sarah Baartman, as well as, this time, that of the celebrated dancer, singer, and actress Josephine Baker—Baker's voice, singing "Voulez-vous de la canne" ("Would you like some sugar cane?"), plays in a loop in the background. The artwork also involved a peephole through which viewers could see an image of Baartman standing on a crate, therefore aligning this kind of sideshow with pornography. These texts can be read on the slats of a wooden platform, reminiscent of the crude constructions used to display and sell slaves, that the viewer accesses via a short stair. Once there, the viewer finds themselves spotlit, their shadow thrown against an attached scrim, and looked at through an illuminated hole in the floor by a pair of motorized, spectacled eyes that wink. Rather than observing performing black female bodies transformed into eroticized spectacle, it is the viewers themselves that become the performance/spectacle.

Import-Export Funk Office (1992) is a subjective map of the flow of hip hop music and related culture between New York City, Los Angeles and Cologne. The work explored "the process of information gathering and the international, national and local transfer of cultural products (specifically hip-hop music, various material produced as a result of the African diaspora… [and] other forms of cultural commerce)." Green positioned herself as an artist-ethnographer, studying the "import/export" of Hip Hop culture through German cultural critic Diedrich Diederichsen, whom Green treats as a "native informant" while he assessed that state of Hip Hop in the United States through German magazines. Green confronted ideologies surrounding cultural economy and pointed to disparities between the production and economy of culture. The archive of cultural fragments she displayed challenged the ethics of cultural appropriation without historical context; images of Angela Davis and Theodore Adorno serve to further confuse the contexts of social translation.

Mise-en-Scène (1992), an investigation of the role in which French cities like Clisson and Nantes played in the Atlantic slave trade.She juxtaposes traditional scenes seen on toile and depictions of violence against Haitian slaves.

Secret (1994). Green inhabited an apartment at Le Corbusier's Firminy Unité d'Habitation, and documented her stay via photographs and video.

Partially Buried in Three Parts (1995–1997). Robert Smithson's land art work Partially Buried Woodshed (1970) functions as the starting point in Green's examination of student's protest movements in the United States, which focuses in the Kent State shootings, as well as in Kwangju's student's massacre which took place in Korea in 1981, also known as Gwangju Democratization Movement. In its installation form, the work presents an examination of the year 1970 from different perspectives.

Some Chance Operations (1999). An essay-film about Italian filmmaker Elvira Notari.

Elsewhere? (2002–2004). The film Elsewhere? was created for an installation located in a garden setting in Kassel, for Documenta 11, Standardized Octagonal Units for Imagined and Existing Systems (2002). The film explores the idea of imaginary places, as well as the history of gardens and garden architecture or follies. In 2003 Elsewhere? was presented as an installation at Portikus, Frankfurt where 1400 colored imaginary place names covered the spaced walls .

Muriel's Words (2004) Andrew McNeely describes this fifty-minute, single-channel sound installation, "In a soft and scarcely audible voice, Green gently whispers a series of discontinuous excerpts from the work of the U.S. poet and activist Muriel Rukeyser (a continual source of fascination for the artist). Cryptic passages such as "it is their violence" and "land, allow me to stand" are read under the breath. The hushed tone leaves one with the sensation of rudely eavesdropping on someone secretly reciting journal entries."

Endless Dreams and Water Between (2009). In this project commissioned by the National Maritime Museum, Greenwich, Green created an immersive environment in which through drawings, sound, banners and films, ideas of islands, physical or mental, are explored. In a film bearing the same title as the exhibition, fictional characters write to each other reflecting on a different range of subjects, among these historical figures like George Sand, Laura Riding, Frédéric Chopin, Robert Graves, and Llorenç Villalonga; the characters also investigate longer histories of the three locations that they inhabit: Mallorca, Manhattan, and the San Francisco Bay Area. Endless Dreams and Water Between.

Begin Again, Begin Again (2015). This exhibition took place at one of the MAK Center for Art and Architecture's site: the former Los Angeles home of Viennese modernist architect R.M. Schindler (1887–1953). This exhibition was composed of ten years' worth of old and new artworks by Green that trace the movement of multiple bodies through time and space. An exhibition statement describes the various installations as a "circulatory experience," where all facets—material and immaterial—combine to "perform" the Schindler House through "converging contrapuntal points." Begin Again, Begin Again (Circulatory Sound)(2015) features a baritone voice (that of the artist's brother, Derrick Green, a frontman for the heavy metal group Sepultura) that utters "begin again, begin again." The show's centerpiece is Begin Again, Begin Again I. 1887–1929 (2015), a single channel forty-five-minute video montage interweaving images of the house with historic footage, oceanic tidal scenes, and various architectural sites. Renée Green later displayed twenty-eight small fabric banners from the Begin Again, Begin Again exhibition in a 2016 exhibition at the Nagel Draxler Galerie. Nagel Draxler writes, "Combining aspects of continuity and rupture, the installation served as a relatively immediate illustration of what Green—borrowing a term from literary theorist Mary Louise Pratt—has called the "contact zone," referring to the encounter staged in her practice between disparate people, cultures, and events. In the contact zone, discrete genealogies become entwined."

Begin Again, Begin Again (Years) (2018). Green exhibited Begin Again, Begin Again at New York's FRIEZE exhibit in 2018.

Cinematic Migrations Project (2014). From March 6–7, 2014 Green presented her two-year collaboration project with John Akomfrah, OBE, and Lina Gopaul called Cinematic Migrations. This presentation was a symposium. This project "poses the notion of “migrations" in relation to "the cinematic" in an intentionally porous juxtaposition, conceived to allow a wide range of questions, interpretations and permutations to emerge.

On September 24, 2019, Pacing, her two-year project at Harvard University's Carpenter Center for Visual Arts, focused on the building's iconic design by Le Corbusier. Green acknowledges conditions of displacement and residency, institutional memory, subjective experience, architectural modernism, notions of progress, and the certainty of decay, all the while reevaluating how time is manifested. Green consistently seeks to expand the likelihood of working within institutions.

=== Educator ===
Working as an educator has been an important facet of Green's career. She has been guest faculty at the Whitney Museum of American Art Independent Study Program (ISP) since 1991, and became the Director of the Studio Program in 1996–1997. From 1997 to 2002 she was Professor at the Akademie der bildenden Künste in Vienna. In 2003 she moved back to the United States to become Distinguished Artist Professor at the University of California, Santa Barbara. From 2005 to June 30, 2011, Green was Professor and Dean of Graduate Studies at the San Francisco Art Institute. During her tenure as Dean she directed Spheres of Interest, the Graduate Lecture Series. Since 2000, she has been a guest faculty at the Maumaus School of Visual Arts in Lisbon. She is currently a professor at the Art, Culture and Technology (ACT) Program, School of Architecture and Planning, Massachusetts Institute of Technology. Other teaching venues as guest professor have included Yale University, Vermont College, Hochschule der Kunst in Berlin, and the Hochschule für Angewandte Kunst, Vienna.

== Awards ==
In 2010, Green won a United States Artists Fellow award.

Green was a recipient of Anonymous Was A Women award in 2021 alongside fellow female artists Coco Fusco, Dyani White Hawk, Autumn Knight, and Judithe Hernández, among others.
