= Bovingdon (disambiguation) =

Bovingdon is a village in England.

Bovingdon may also refer to:

- RAF Bovingdon, Royal Air Force military base, England
- John Bovingdon (1890–1973), modern dancer and economic analyst, USA

== See also ==
- Bovingdon Green, Buckinghamshire, England
- Bovingdon Hall Woods, biological area, England
- Bovingdon stack, airspace, England
- Bovington (disambiguation)
- Boyington
