= Bovington (disambiguation) =

Bovington may refer to:

== People ==
- Edward Ernest Perrian Bovington (born 1941), football player, England
- Torchil de Bovington (11th-century), landowner, Norman England
- Victor Bovington (* 1903, date of death unknown), rower, United Kingdom

== Locations ==
- Bovington Camp, British Army military base, Dorset, England
- The Tank Museum, military museum, Bovington Camp, England

== See also ==
- Bovingdon (disambiguation)
- Boyington
