= Boynton =

Boynton may refer to:

== People ==
- Boynton (surname)

== Places ==
=== In the United States ===
- Boynton Township, Tazewell County, Illinois
- Boynton, Georgia, an unincorporated community
- Boynton, Missouri, an unincorporated community
- Boynton, Oklahoma, a town
- Boynton, Texas a ghost town
- Boynton–Oakwood Heights, a neighborhood of Detroit

=== In the United Kingdom ===
- Boynton, East Riding of Yorkshire, England, a village and civil parish

== Other uses ==
- Boynton School, now named Schoolhouse Children's Museum & Learning Center, Boynton Beach, Florida, on the National Register of Historic Places

== See also ==
- Boynton Beach, Florida
- Boynton Inlet
- John Bayton, a Hambledon cricketer whose surname was occasionally spelled Boynton
- Boyington
