= John Bovingdon =

American economist (1890–1973)

John Bovingdon (1890–1973) was a modern dancer-turned-economic analyst who performed regularly at the Kings Road House of architect R.M. Schindler in Los Angeles in the 1920s. He studied economics at Harvard and graduated with high honors in 1915. After graduation, he moved to Japan and worked as a professor of economics at Keio University until 1920. He was fired from his post at the Office of Economic Warfare in 1943 following "publication of assertions that Bovingdon used to be a ballet dancer and once had Communist associations." Martin Dies Jr. was critical of his employment there.

He traveled to Russia to work on the film Black and White.

Bovingdon founded a dance school with his wife, Jeanya Marling. She later married Soviet playwright Alexander Afinogenov.
