= Tilt up =

Type of building and construction technique

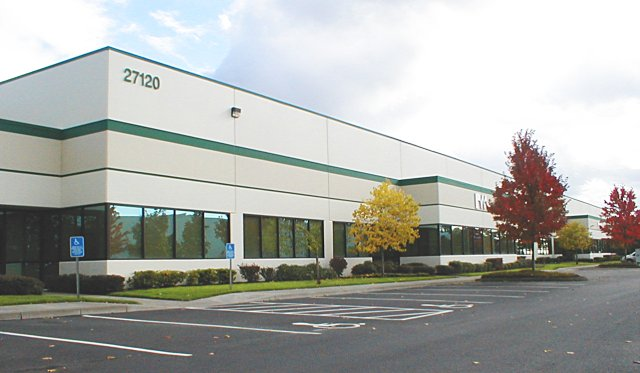
A finished tilt-up building

Tilt-up, tilt-slab or tilt-wall is a type of building and a construction technique using concrete. Though it is a cost-effective technique with a shorter completion time, poor performance in earthquakes has mandated significant seismic retrofit requirements in older buildings.

With the tilt-up method, concrete elements (walls, columns, structural supports, etc.) are formed horizontally on a concrete slab; this normally requires the building floor as a building form but may be a temporary concrete casting surface near the building footprint. After the concrete has cured, the elements are "tilted" to the vertical position with a crane and braced into position until the remaining building structural components (roofs, intermediate floors and walls) are secured.

Tilt-up construction is a common method of construction throughout North America, several Caribbean nations, Australia, and New Zealand. It is not significantly used in Europe or the northern two thirds of Asia. It is gaining popularity in southern Asia, the Middle East, parts of Africa, Central and South America.

Concrete elements can also be formed at factories away from the building site. Tilt-up differs from prefabrication, or plant cast construction, in that all elements are constructed on the job site. This eliminates the size limitation imposed by transporting elements from a factory to the project site.

== Construction ==
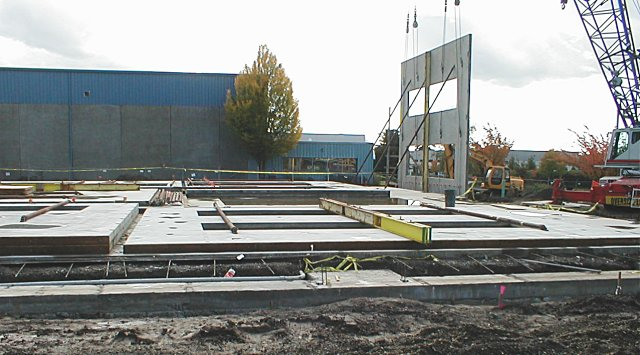
A tilt-up building during construction. A cast wall section is being righted. Other sections are visible in their forms.

Tilt-up construction requires significant organization and collaboration on the building site. The chronological steps that need to be taken for a tilt-up project are: site evaluation, engineering, footings and floor slabs, forming tilt-up panels, steel placement, embeds and inserts, concrete placement, panel erection and panel finishing. Once the pad (casting surface or floor slab) has cured, forms are built on top. Dimensional lumber, a high quality plywood or fiber board that has at least one smooth face is typically used, although aluminum or steel forms are also common. Carpenters work from engineered drawings designed for each panel or element to construct on site. They incorporate all door and window openings, as well as architectural features and other desired shapes that can be molded into the concrete. Studs, gussets and attachment plates are located within the form for embedding in the concrete. The forms are usually anchored to the casting surface with masonry nails or otherwise adhered to prevent damage to the floor slab.

Next, a chemically reactive bondbreaker is sprayed on the form's surfaces to prevent the cast concrete from bonding with the slab. This allows the cast element to separate from the casting surface once it has cured. This is a critical step, as improper chemical selection or application will prevent the lifting of the panels, and will entail costly demolition and rework.

A rebar grid is constructed inside the forms, after the form release is applied, spaced off the casting surface the desired distance with plastic "chairs". The rebar size and spacing is generally specified by the engineer of record.

Concrete is then poured, filling the desired thickness and surrounding all steel inserts, embedded features and rebar. The concrete is then settled through vibration to prevent any voids or honeycomb effects. The forms are removed when the concrete is cured; rigging is attached and a crane tilts the panel or lifts the element into place. In circumstances when space is at a premium, concrete elements can be cast one on top of the other, or stack cast. Quite often a separate casting pad is poured for this purpose and is removed when the panels are erected.

Cranes are used to tilt the concrete elements from the casting slab to a vertical position. The slabs are then most often set onto a foundation and secured with braces until the structural steel and the roof diaphragm is in place.

== Structure ==
Concrete tilt-up walls can be very heavy, sometimes over 300,000 pounds (140 t). Most tilt-up wall panels are engineered to work with the roof structure and/or floor structures to resist all forces; that is, to function as load-bearing walls. The connections to the roof and floors are usually steel plates with headed studs that were secured into the forms prior to concrete placement. These attachment points are bolted or welded. The upper attachment points are made to the roof trusses. Interior walls may be present for additional stiffness in the building structure as necessary, known as shear walls.

Insulation can be applied to either side of the panels or cast as an integral part of the panel between two layers of concrete to create sandwich panels. Concrete has the ability to absorb and store energy and is high mass, which regulates interior temperature (thermal mass) and provides soundproofing and durability.

Like all concrete construction, tilt-up buildings are fire-resistant. In addition, wall panels can be designed to sag inward when damaged, which minimizes collapse (this can also be done with prefabricated panels).

== Uses ==
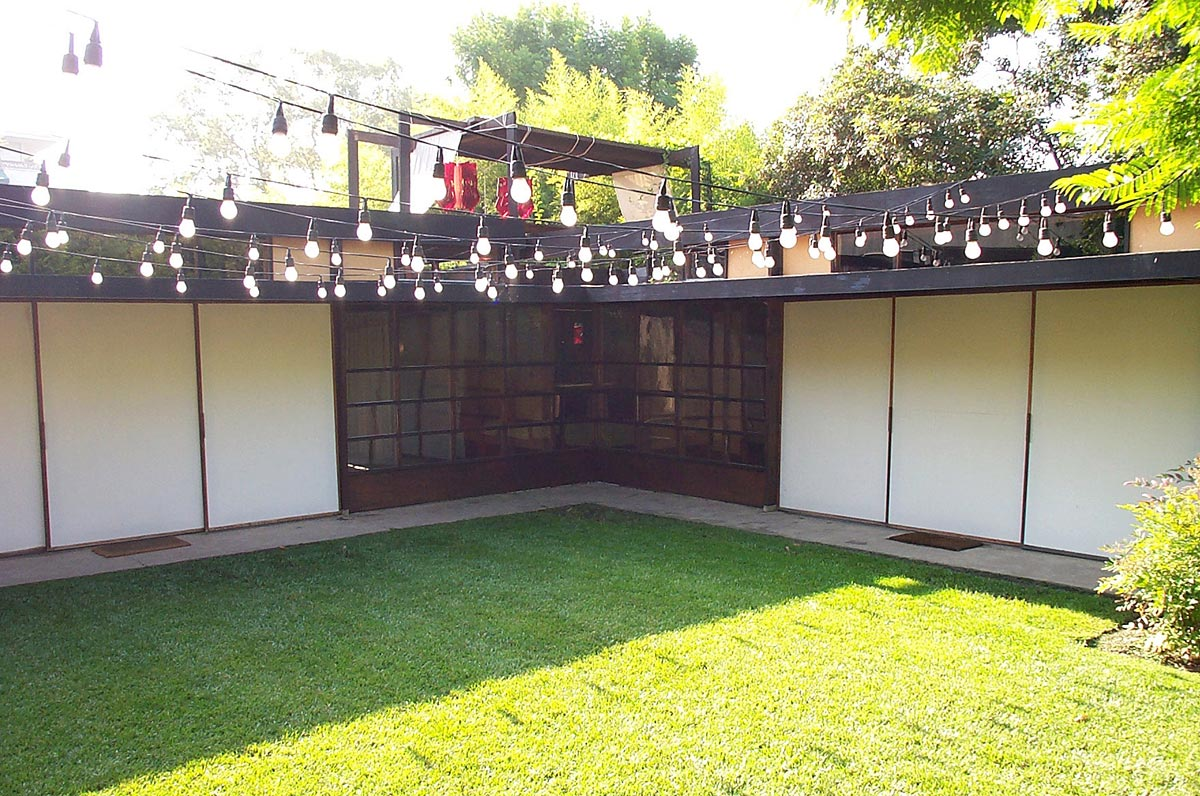
Schindler House is an early example of tilt-up house construction

Tilt-up was first used in America circa 1905. In 1908 Robert Akin patented the tilt-slab method of concrete construction used in the construction of the Schindler House. Early erection was done using tilt tables, but the development of the mobile crane and truck mixers allowed tilt-up construction to grow. Tilt-up gained widespread popularity in the post World War II construction boom. Tilt-up was not used successfully in Australia until 1969.

Most early tilt-up buildings were warehouses. Today the method is used in nearly every type of building from schools to office structures, houses to hotels. They range from single story to more than seven and can be more than 29 metres (96 feet) in height.

An early example of this method is found in the innovative Schindler House, built in 1922 in West Hollywood, California. Architect Rudolf Schindler claimed that with the assistance of a small hand-operated crane, just two workmen were needed to raise and attach the tilt-up walls.

The first tilt-up built home in Ontario, Canada was built in 2017.

== Appearance ==
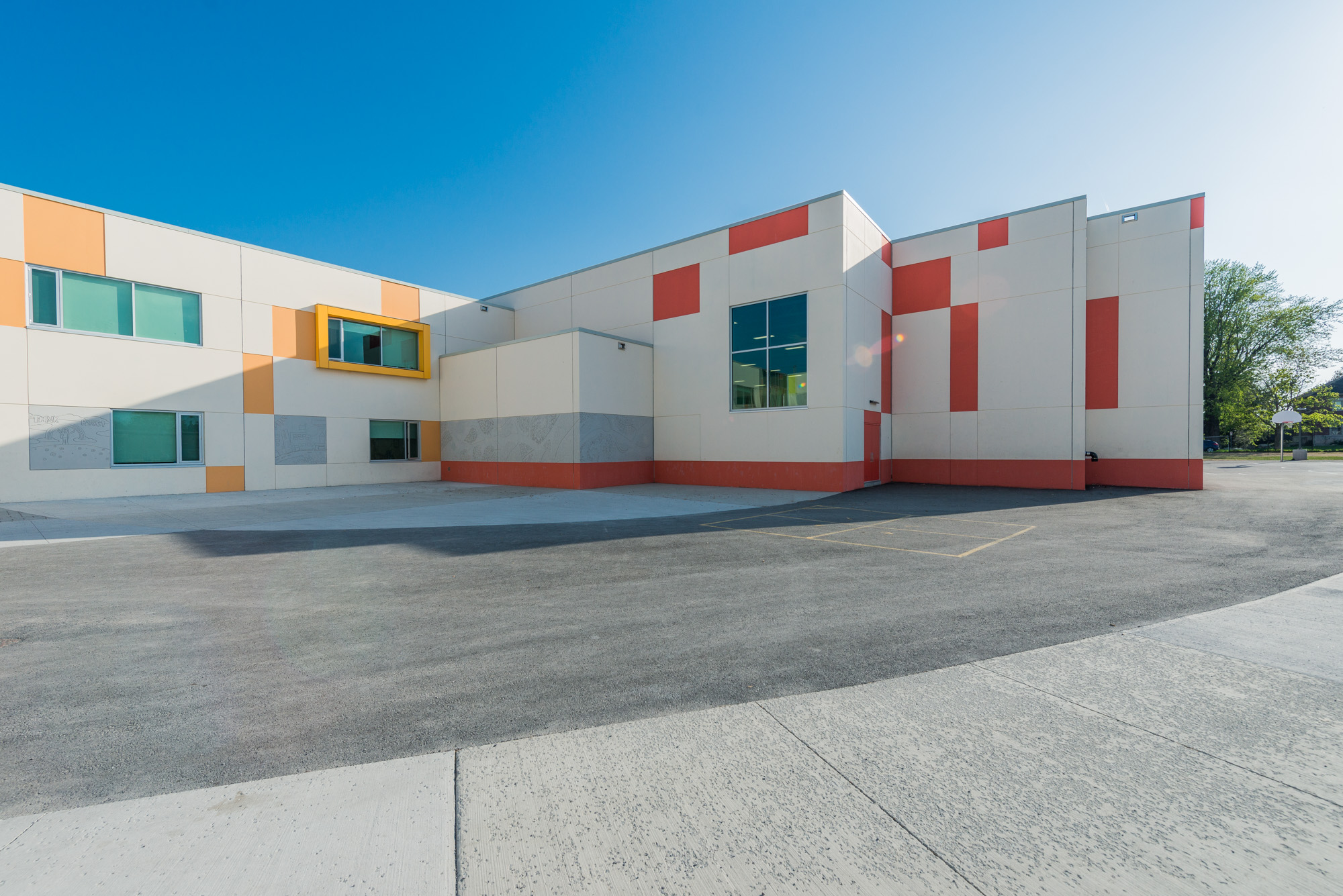
The school's architectural design highlights the flexibility offered by tilt-up concrete construction. The building's tilt-up panels include brick veneer and concrete finishes that incorporate recessed images of children's artwork. Public School, Ottawa, ON

Early tilt-up architecture was very minimalist and boxy. Recent techniques have expanded the range of appearance and shape.

Many finish options are available to the tilt-up contractor, from paints and stains to pigmented concrete, cast-in features like brick and stone to aggressive erosion finishes like sandblasting and acid-etching. Shapes are also a feature that have become dominant in the tilt-up market, with many panels configured with circular or elliptical openings, panel tops that are pedimented or curved, facades that are curved or segmented and featured with significant areas of glazing or other materials.

== Association ==
The Tilt-Up Concrete Association (TCA) is the international trade association for tilt-up concrete construction. TCA is a membership-based association, with nearly 500 members worldwide. TCA members can be contractors (general contractors or tilt-up subcontractors), engineers, architects, developers, consultants, suppliers, specialty trade firms, educators and students.

TCA offers primarily educational, networking and exposure benefits to its members. TCA also offers an Achievement Awards program annually, recognizing the best examples of tilt-up construction over a variety of end uses.

== Risks ==
In the wake of the 2011 Joplin tornado in which seven people were killed in a Home Depot when the 100,000-pound (45 t) panel walls collapsed after the store was hit by an EF5 tornado, engineers in an article published in The Kansas City Star criticized the practice. They said that once one wall falls, it creates a domino effect. Twenty-eight people in an un-reinforced training room in the back of the building survived. According to a study of the collapse, the tornado hit the south corner of the store and lifted the roof up causing the west walls to collapse into the store. The walls on the east side (where the people survived) collapsed out. Only two walls remained standing. Engineers said that stronger roof-to-wall connections might have tempered the collapse. Two other big box stores at the corner that had concrete block construction (an Academy Sports + Outdoors and Walmart) lost their roofs but the walls remained intact. Those buildings were not directly hit by the tornado but the Home Depot building suffered a direct hit. Three people died in the Walmart, but 200 survived. The engineers told the Star that when concrete blocks fail they usually break apart, and do not come down in huge slabs. Home Depot, which has hundreds of stores built with tilt-up, said it disagreed with the finding and that it would use tilt-up when it rebuilt the Joplin store.

Shortly after publication of the Kansas City Star article, the technical committee of the Tilt-Up Concrete Association (TCA) formed a task force to investigate the claims presented in the article. With the cooperation of Home Depot, the task group performed detailed engineering calculations, research and investigation of the claims posed in the article. This task force consisted of a nationwide group of practicing structural engineers with a diverse range of experience in tilt-up construction and "big box" buildings. The final report was published on January 12, 2012. "The information provided in these findings will help Association efforts to promote the benefits of site cast Tilt-Up construction and dispute many of the claims presented in The Kansas City Star article."

=== Findings of the Task Force ===
"The Task Force's findings to date include:

1. The failure started in the structural steel, steel joist and wide-rib deck roof system. This roof system is one of the most commonly used systems in commercial buildings, including those with masonry walls, precast concrete walls, and almost all forms of wall construction.
2. The Tilt-Up concrete panels performed very well and survived the extreme loads of the EF-5 event only to collapse after the roof failed due to lack of bracing mechanism.
3. Tilt-Up construction methods played no role in the failure.
4. The perception that the nearby Wal-Mart store performed better because it was concrete masonry is false. The Wal-Mart took a glancing blow from the storm and the Home Depot took a direct hit."

One of the conclusions of the Task Force's report was "Recommend to ICC and direct to building owners the use of storm shelters in lieu of designing buildings for high winds. The TCA should develop specific Tilt-Up based storm shelter designs for winds of up to 200 MPH that would compete against alternative masonry, precast, or cast-in-place designs. Storm shelter design is addressed in 2009 IBC, section 423 and ICC-500."

== Gallery ==
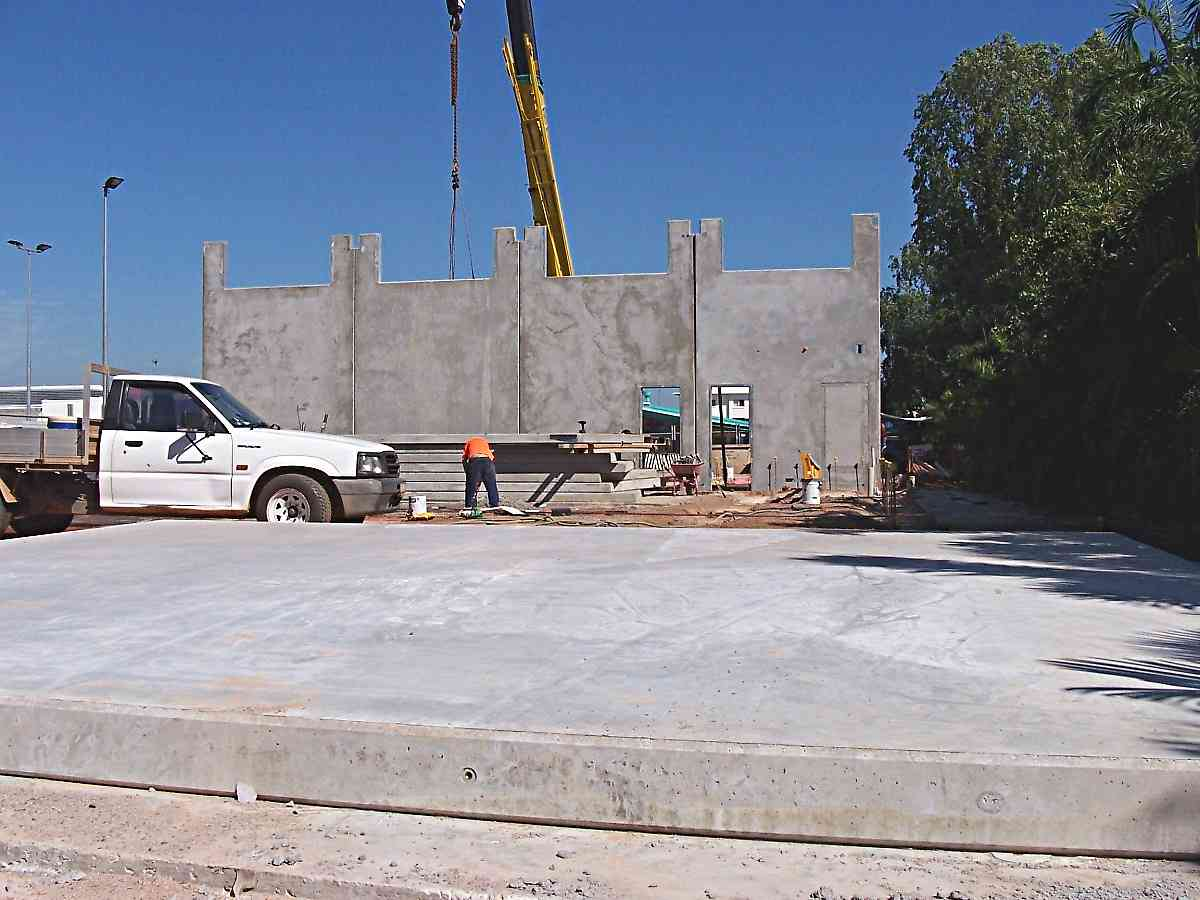
Cast panel on temporary casting pad (foreground), with panels being erected in background. Small retail shop, Northern Australia.

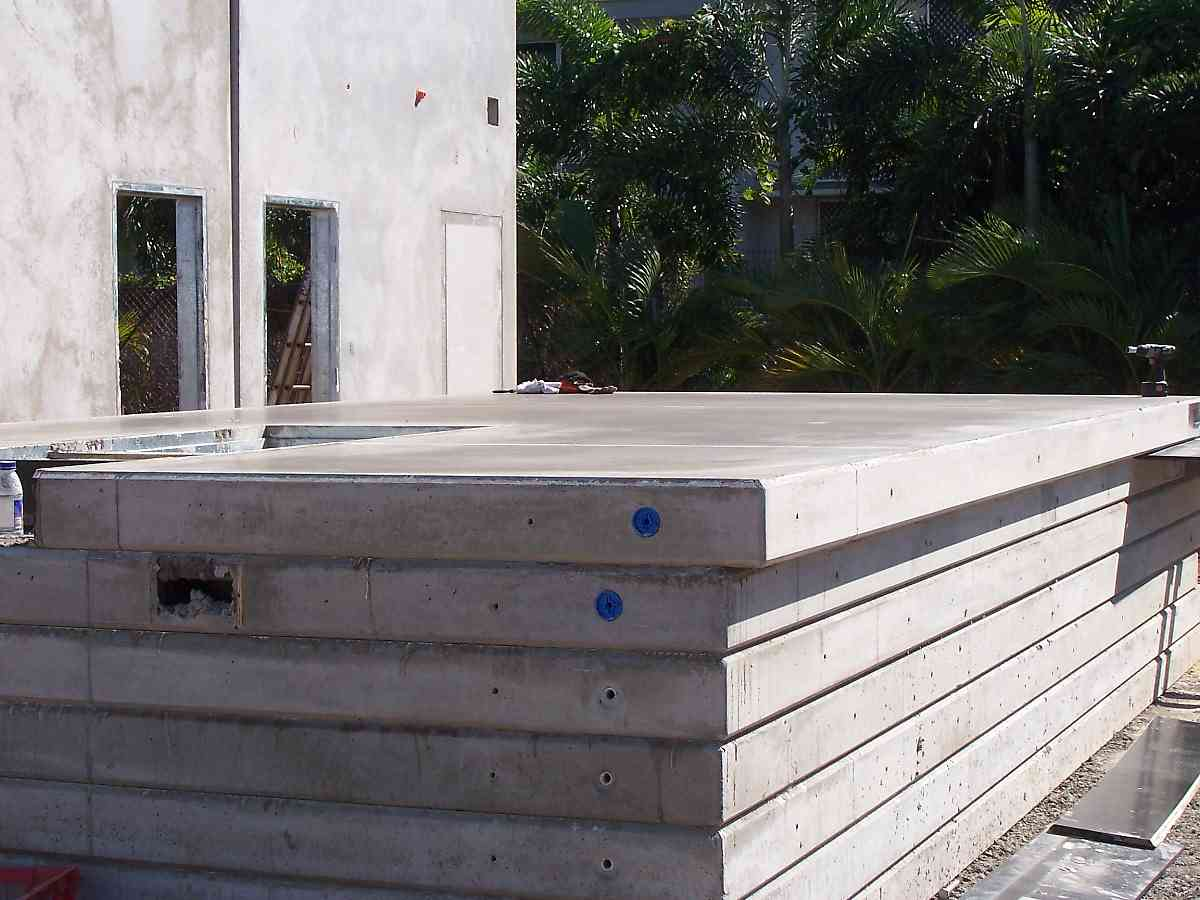
Stack-cast panels.

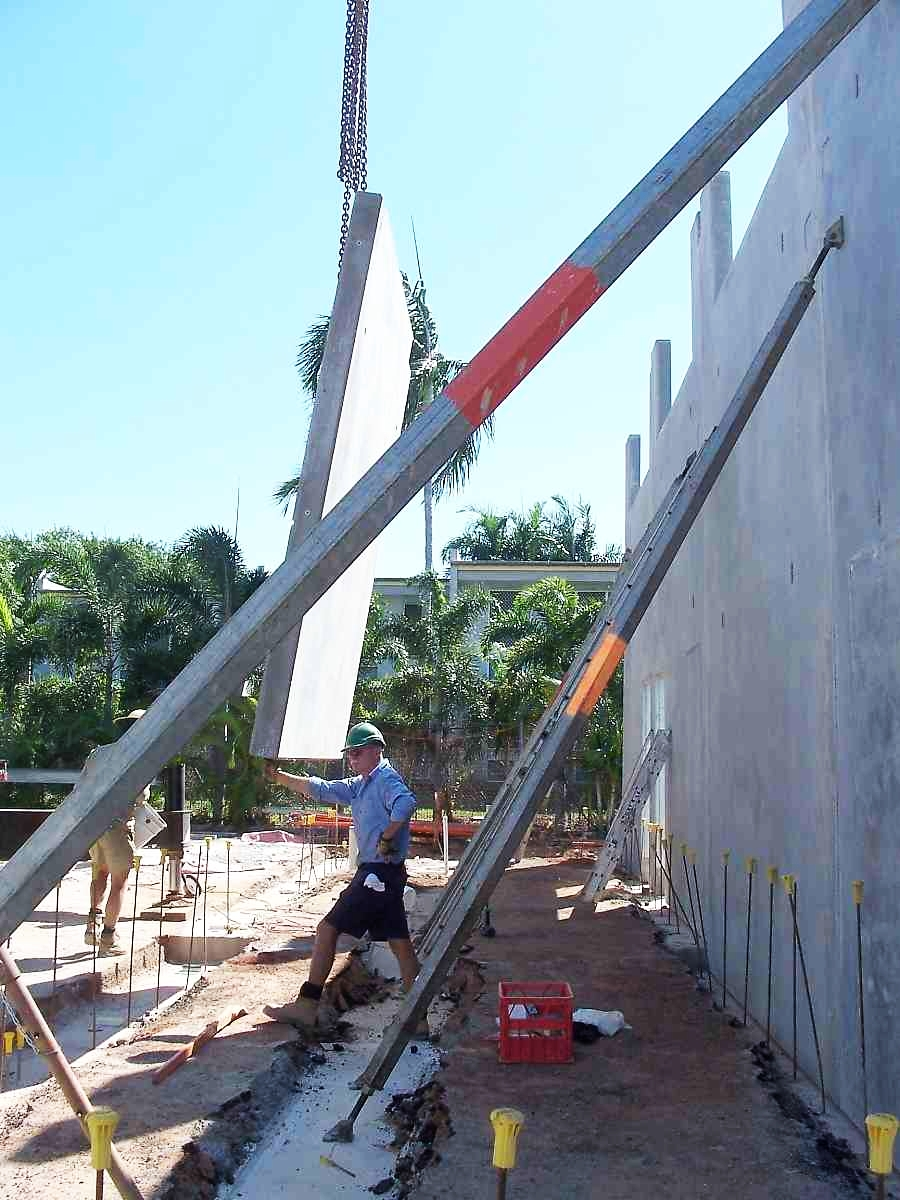
Panel being hoisted into position.

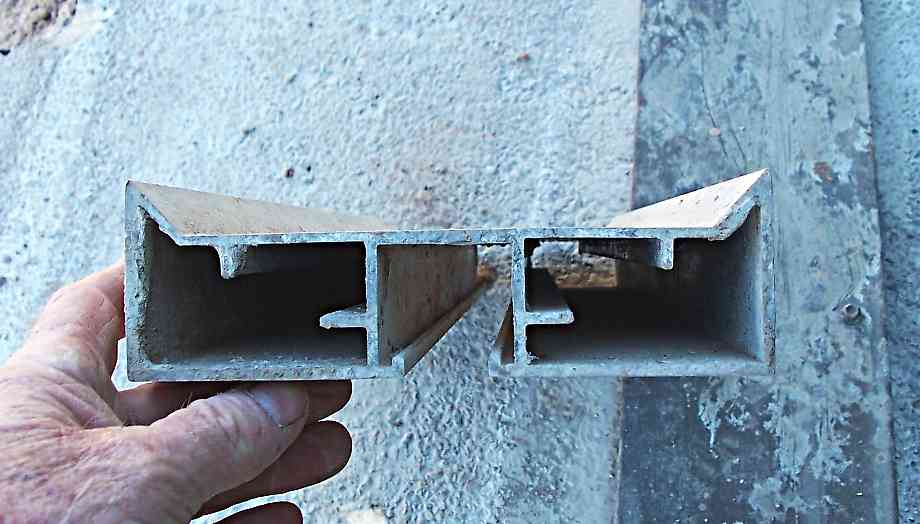
Extruded aluminium form section.

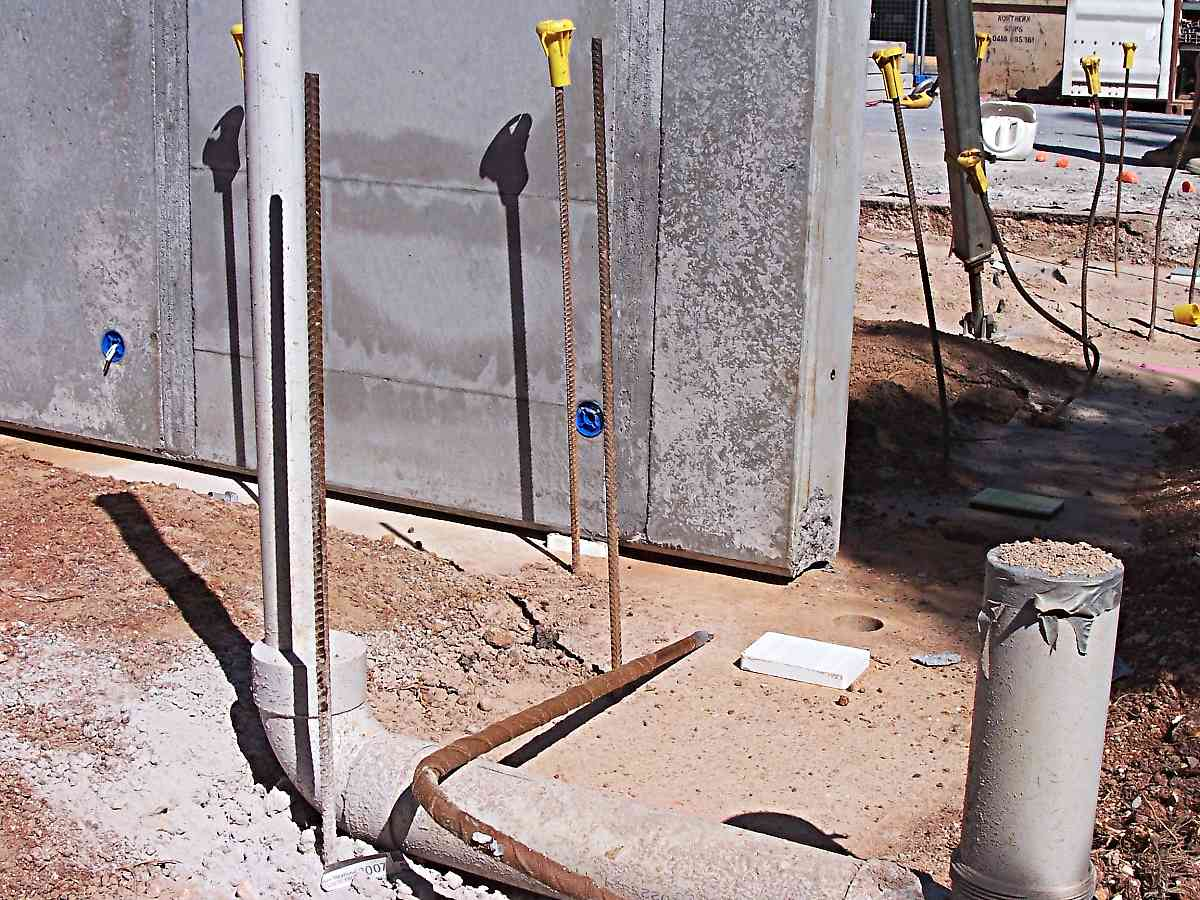
Base detail of tilt-slab sat on strip footings. Finished floor level will be approx. 75mm higher than blue inserts. Inserts take threaded rebar into floor slab.

== See also ==
- Lift slab
