= Bethlehem Baptist Church (Los Angeles) =

Church in Los Angeles, USA

Coordinates: 33.998348°N 118.247962°W

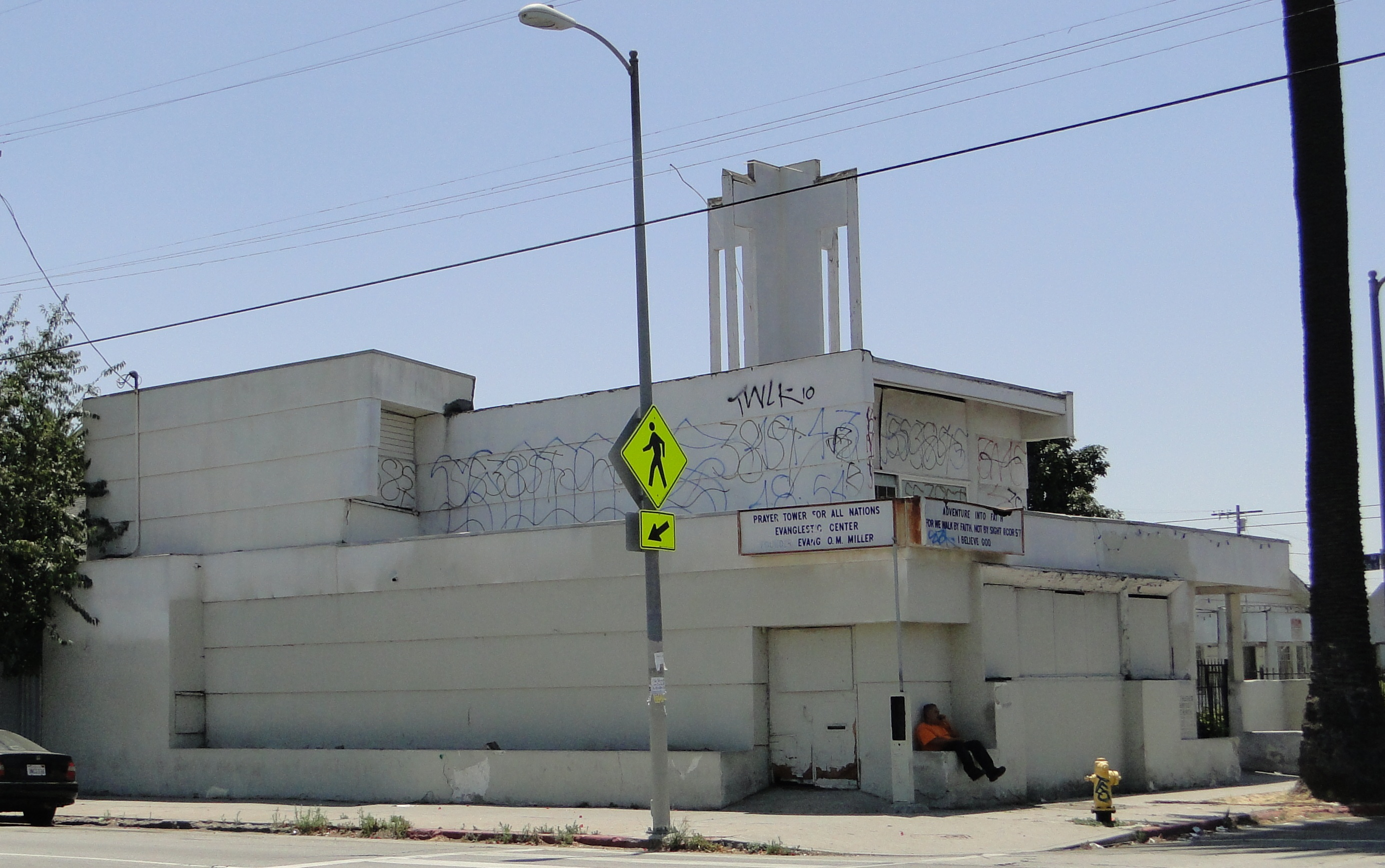
In 2011

The Bethlehem Baptist Church in Los Angeles was designed by architect R.M. Schindler, and built in 1944. Located in the Central-Alameda district of Los Angeles, United States, on the corner of Compton Avenue and 49th Street, it is the only example of a church designed by Schindler, and "the lone example of Modernist architecture to cross Los Angeles economic and racial boundaries in the era of Jim Crow housing covenants".

== History ==
In 2009, Bethlehem Baptist Church was declared a Historic-Cultural Monument by the Los Angeles City Council. It had been in a state of abandonment for around ten years, but was then occupied by Faith Build International congregation. Faith-Build International paid the initial $17,500 to lease the property with an option to buy, then began restoring it in February 2014.

In late 2015, the Bethlehem Baptist Church hosted artist Robert Barry’s first solo show in Los Angeles since 1989.

== Design ==
A downward-sloping floor leads to the pulpit, which branches out to two seating areas at 90-degree angles.
