= El Pueblo Ribera =

Coordinates: 32°49′43.69″N 117°16′44.31″W

El Pueblo Ribera Court is a complex of 12 duplexes at 230–248 Gravilla Street and 230–309 Playa del Sur in La Jolla, a community of San Diego, California. It was designed in 1923 by the Austrian-American Rudolf Schindler. Schindler's most famous works are in and around Los Angeles; El Pueblo Ribera is his only work in San Diego.

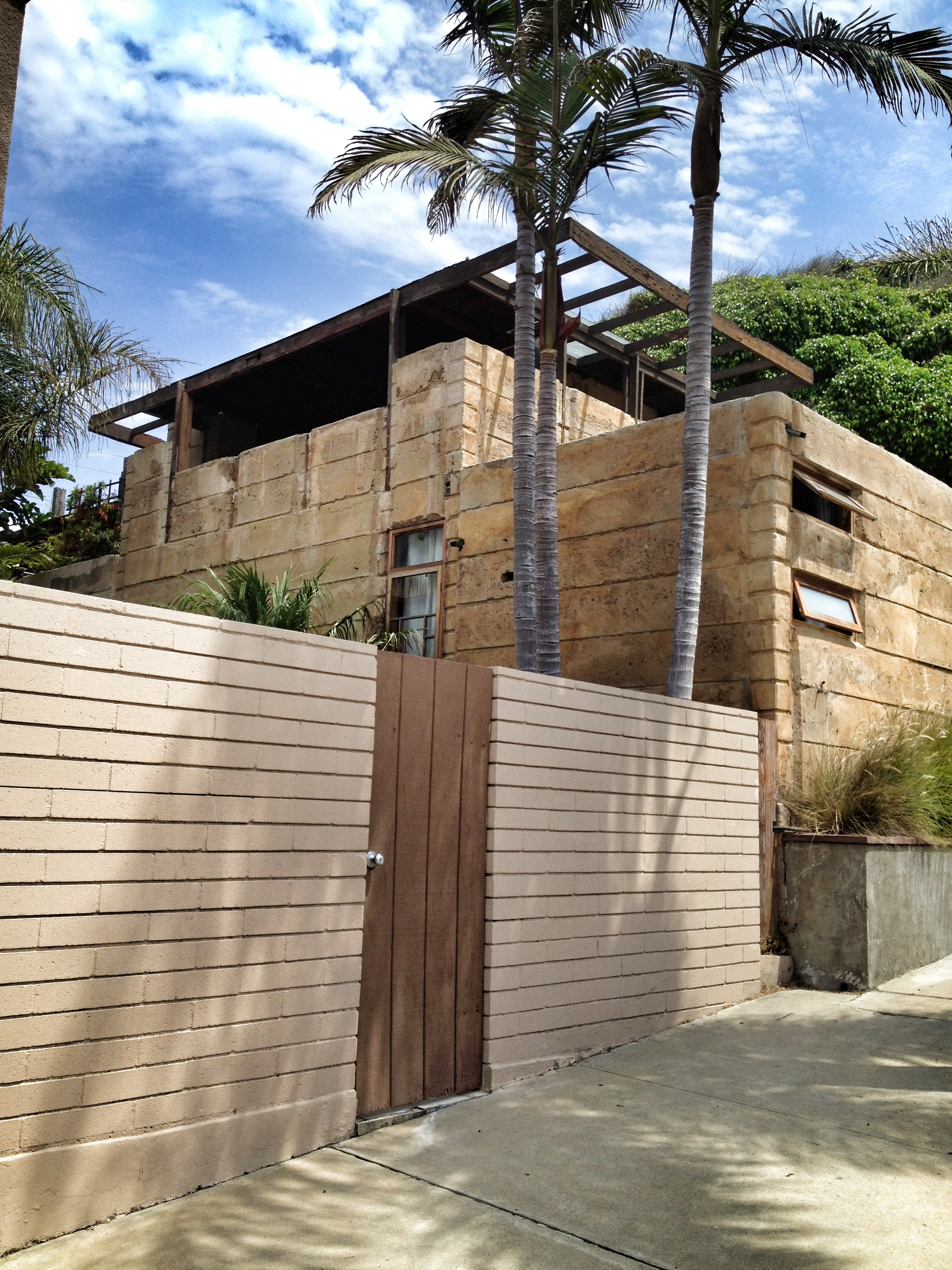
El Pueblo Ribera, side view of the complex from the west

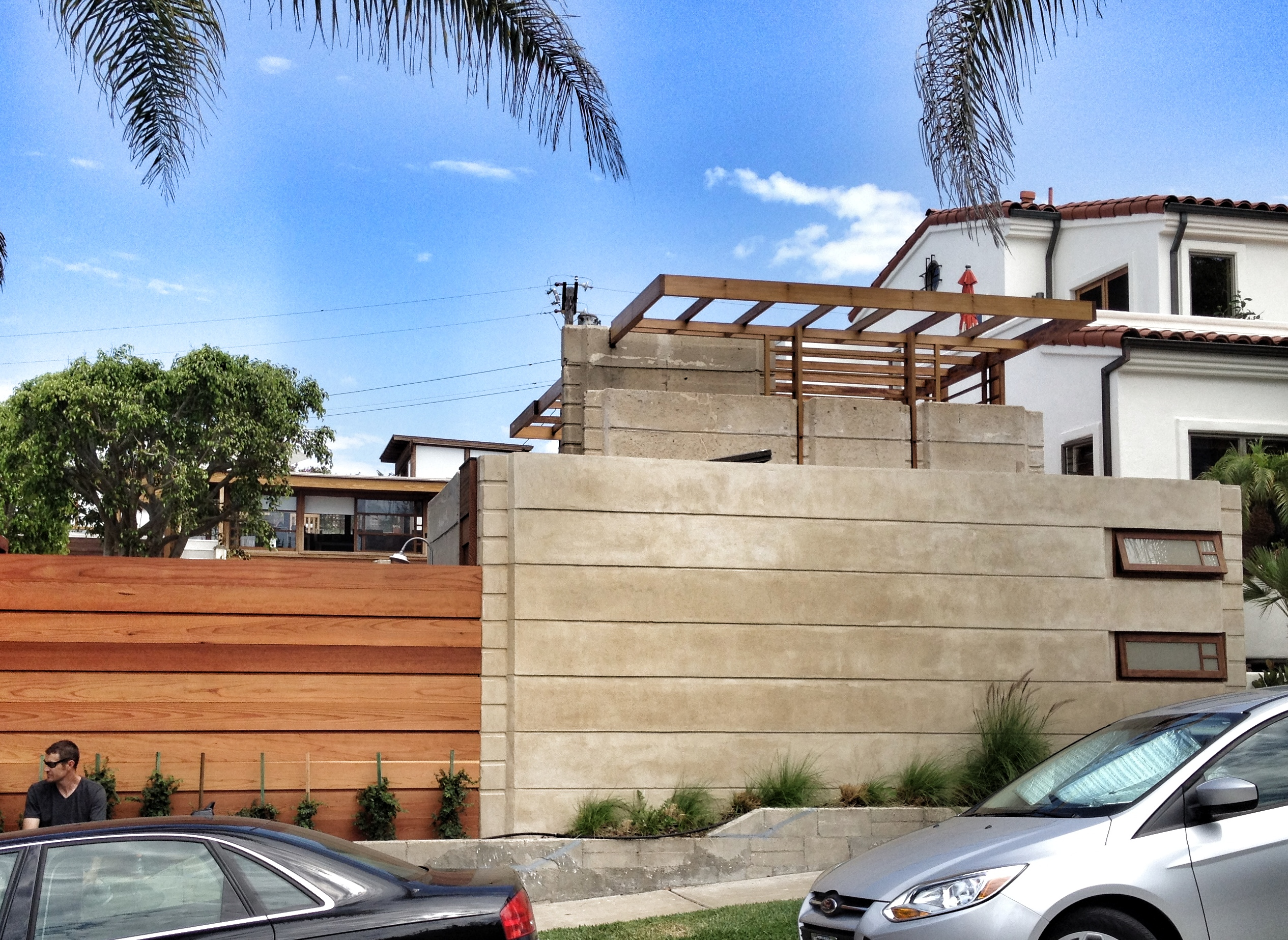
El Pueblo Ribera, view from south of east end of complex

== History ==
The complex was built in Modern architectural style. Each unit originally consisted of a bedroom on the ground level, and a sleeping porch on the upper level. Each unit enjoys a view of La Jolla's Windansea Beach.

The San Diego Historical Society declared the complex a historic district in 1977 (historic site #117).
