= Alexander Afinogenov =

Russian and Soviet playwright

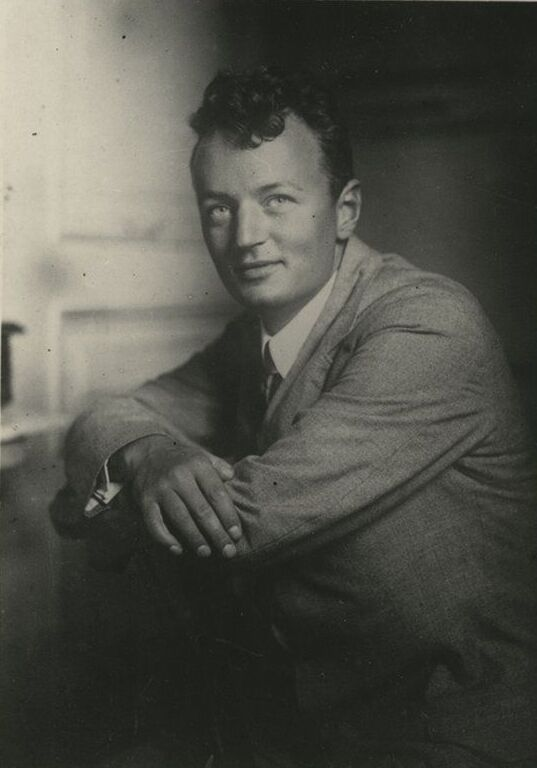
- Born: April 4, 1904; Skopin, Russian Empire
- Died: October 29, 1941 (aged 37); Moscow, Soviet Union

Alexander Nikolayevich Afinogenov (Russian: Алекса́ндр Никола́евич Афиноге́нов) (4 April [O.S. 22 March] 1904, – 29 October 1941) was a Russian and Soviet playwright.

== Biography ==
Alexander was born in the town of Skopin, in Ryazan Oblast. He joined the CPSU in 1922. He obtained a degree in journalism in 1924, the year that he published his first play. In the 1920s he was a member and later director of the Proletkult's theatre. He turned away from the Proletkult in the late 1920s, and became in the early 1930s the chief drama theoretician of the Russian Association of Proletarian Writers. He wrote 26 plays, but he is best known for Fear (1931) and Mashenka (1941). His work was attacked in 1936 and he was expelled from the CPSU in 1937, but he was never purged, and was rehabilitated in 1938. He continued writing until his death in a German air raid in 1941. He was married to American ballerina Jenny Marling (Schwartz). Her first husband was John Bovingdon.

== Works ==
His play Crank (Чудак) satirises bureaucracy, protectionism, and antisemitism. It was produced by the Second Moscow Art Theatre in 1929, in a production that featured Azarii Azarin as Volgin, Serafima Birman as Troshchina, and Sofya Giatsintova as Sima. His later plays Fear (Страх, 1931) and A Far Place (Далекое, 1935) were very popular with audiences; "he is distinguished among Soviet playwrights for his interest in personal psychological problems."

== Sources ==
- Solovyova, Inna. 1999. "The Theatre and Socialist Realism, 1929-1953." Trans. Jean Benedetti. In A History of Russian Theatre. Ed. Robert Leach and Victor Borovsky. Cambridge: Cambridge UP. 325–357. ISBN 0-521-43220-0.
