= Pauline Gibling Schindler =

American composer, educator and arts promoter

Pauline Schindler
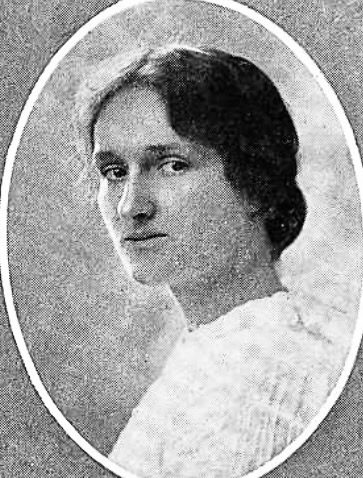
- Gibling in 1915
- Born: Sophie Pauline Gibling; March 19, 1893; Minneapolis, Minnesota, US
- Died: May 4, 1977 (aged 84); Los Angeles, California, US
- Occupations: Composer, educator, editor
- Spouse: Rudolph Schindler (m. 1919; div. 1927)
- Children: 1

Pauline Gibling Schindler (March 19, 1893 – May 4, 1977) was an American composer, educator, editor, and arts promoter, especially influential in supporting modern art in Southern California. Her husband was architect Rudolph Schindler.

== Early life and education ==
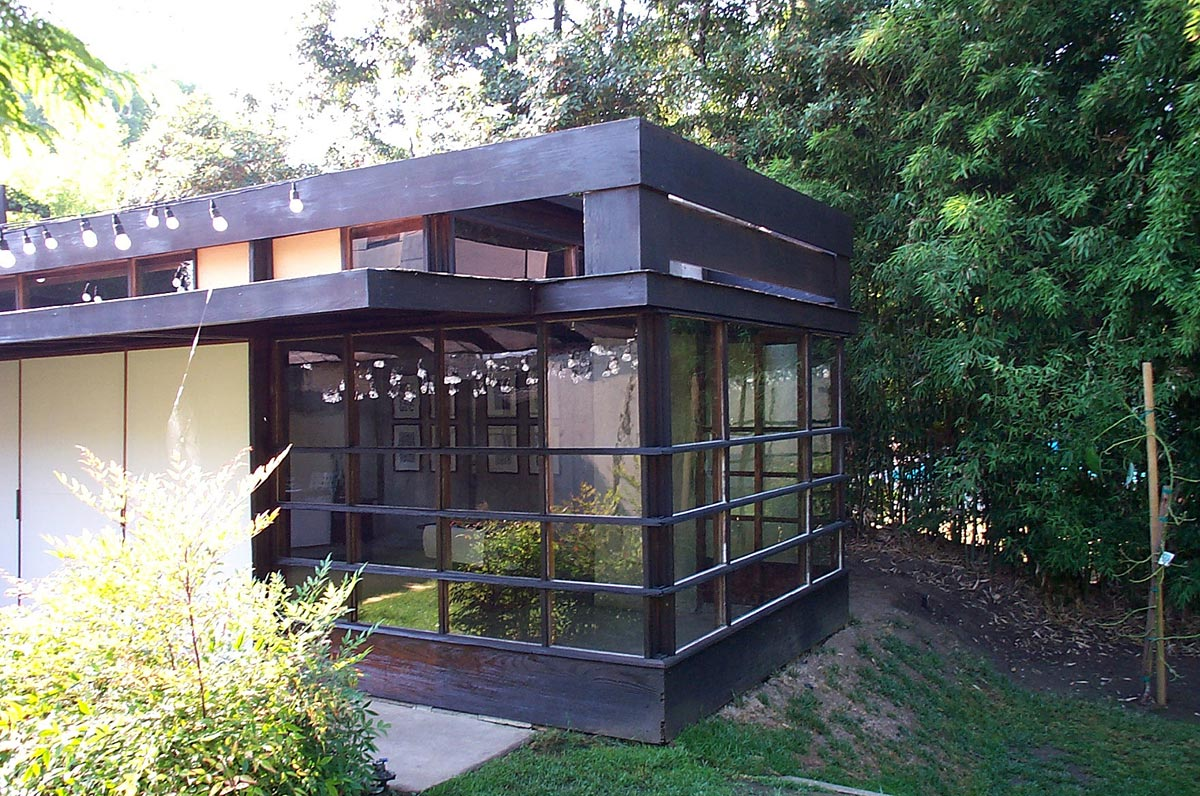
Schindler House (Rudolf Schindler), 1922

Her father was English-born. Pauline Gibling was raised in the New York City area, and attended Columbia High School in Maplewood, New Jersey, where she was classmates with Alfred Kinsey. She studied music at Smith College, in the class of 1915. After graduation she spent two years teaching piano at Hull House in Chicago, Illinois.

She married architect Rudolph Schindler in August 1919 in Chicago. They lived briefly at Taliesin the next year before moving to Los Angeles, where Schindler worked for Frank Lloyd Wright. Their home, the Schindler House in West Hollywood, was completed in 1922, an experiment in shared living, called "the built evocation of Schindler's collaboration with his wife."

== Career ==
While still in Los Angeles, she taught at the Walt Whitman School in Boyle Heights, and served with Rudolph on the school's board. Through the school, they met photographer Edward Weston, whose sons were students there. The couple hosted social gatherings at Schindler House, with Pauline mainly inviting artists and political thinkers. Pauline wrote an affidavit of support for architect Richard Neutra's visa into the United States in 1923, and the Neutras later lived at Schindler House for a few years.

After separating from Schindler in 1927, Pauline moved to the artists' colonies at Carmel-by-the-Sea, California. She edited the weekly Carmel Pine Cone newspaper and later The Carmelite publication, where she clashed with fellow editor Lincoln Steffens.

Schindler moved to Oceano, California, where she helped to edit a monthly arts journal, Dune Forum. She also lived at Halcyon, Santa Fe, and Ojai during these years.

She returned to the Schindler House in the late 1930s, and lived there with her ex-husband until he died in 1953, and with others until her death in 1977. She painted her side of the house pink, added carpeting and updated the plumbing in her later years.

As a musicologist she published as "Sophie P. Gibling," the titles Types of Musical Listening and Problems of Musical Criticism.

== Personal life ==
Gibling and Schindler had one son, Mark. They divorced in 1940. She had a brief relationship with composer John Cage, who was almost twenty years her junior, in the 1930s.

== Death ==
Pauline died on May 4, 1977 in Los Angeles, California, at the age of 84.

== Legacy ==
The non-profit Friends of Schindler House was formed by Pauline in 1976, shortly before her death, to maintain the house. It has since become an arts center, and is open for architectural tours.

A musical performance based on Schindler's life, Pauline: An Opera, was presented by architects Frank Escher and Ravi GuneWardena at Schindler House, in October 2013.

== Other sources ==
- Crosse, John (2014). The Carmelites in "Bohemian Crossroads: Art & Culture Collide Then Subside on the Monterey Peninsula" edited by Ted Wells. Guardian Stewardship Editions. ISBN 978-0991134908.
- Hines, Thomas S. (January 2019). "Critic and Catalyst: Pauline Gibling Schindler (1893–1977)". Getty Research Journal. 11: 39–80. doi:10.1086/702748. ISSN 1944-8740.
- "Pauline Gibling Schindler: Vagabond Agent for Modernism, 1927-1936", California Architectural History, July 14, 2010
