= Rudolph Schindler (architect) =

American architect

Rudolph Michael Schindler
- Born: September 10, 1887; Vienna, Austria
- Died: August 22, 1953 (aged 65); Los Angeles, California, US
- Occupation: Architect
- Spouse: Pauline Gibling Schindler (m. 1919; div. 1927)
- Children: 1
- Buildings: Kings Road House, Lovell Beach House

Rudolph Michael Schindler (born Rudolf Michael Schlesinger; September 10, 1887 – August 22, 1953) was an Austrian-born American architect whose most important works were built in or near Los Angeles during the early to mid-twentieth century.

Although he worked and trained with some of its foremost practitioners, he often is associated with the fringes of the modernist movement in architecture. His use of complex three-dimensional forms, "warm" materials, and striking colors, as well as his ability to work within tight budgets, however, have placed him as one of the mavericks of early twentieth century architecture. Reyner Banham said he designed "as if there had never been houses before".

== Early history ==
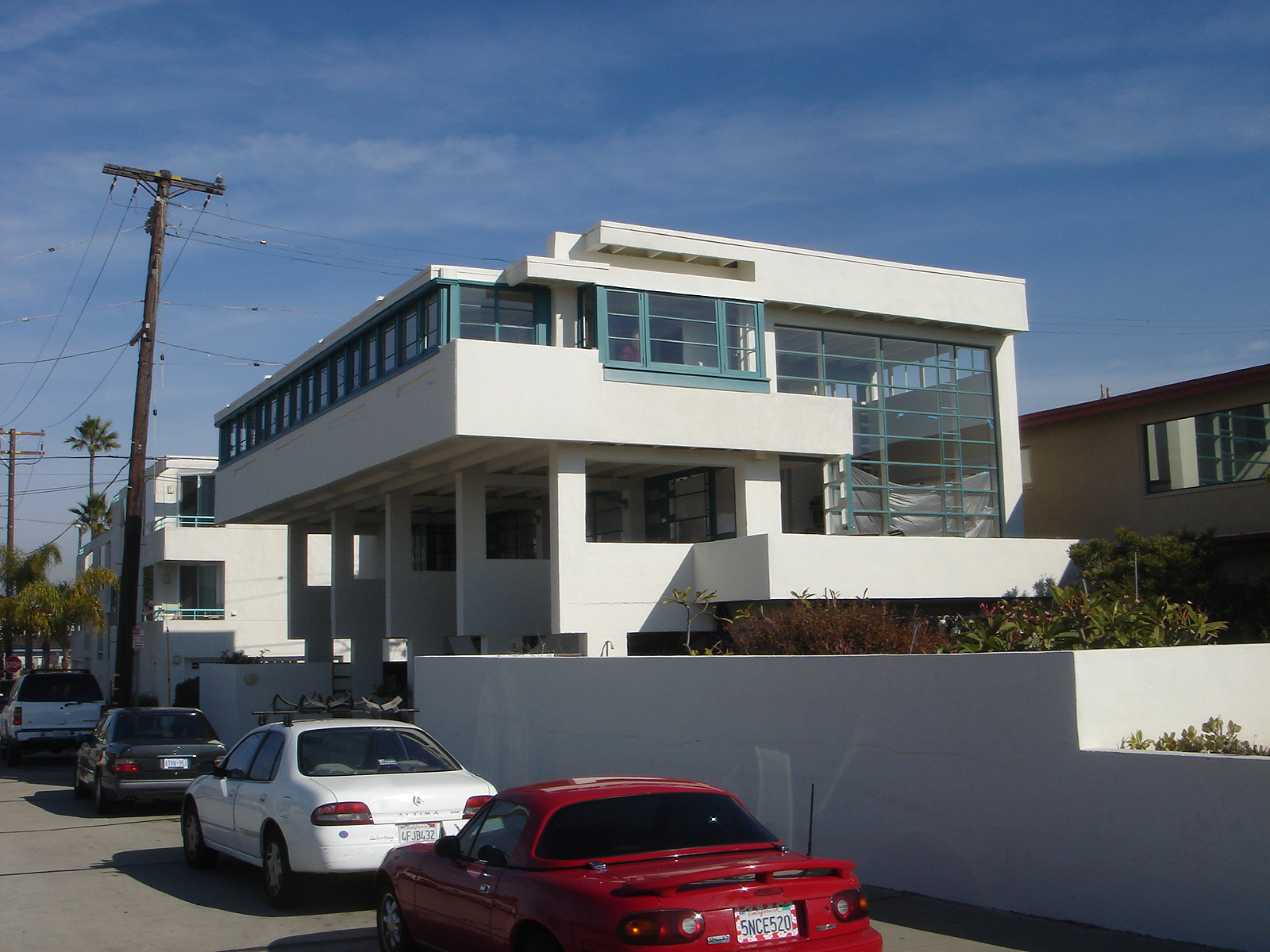
Lovell Beach House, Newport Beach, Balboa, California, designed by Rudolph Schindler in 1922

Rudolf Michael Schindler was born on September 10, 1887, to a middle-class Jewish family in Vienna, Austria. His father was a wood and metal craftsman and an importer; his mother was a dressmaker. He attended the Imperial and Royal High School, from 1899 to 1906, and enrolled at the Vienna University of Technology before attending the Vienna Academy of Fine Arts, or Wagnerschule, being graduated in 1911 with a degree in architecture. For unknown reasons, his family changed their surname from 'Schlesinger' to 'Schindler' in 1901.

Schindler was most influenced by professor Carl König, despite the presence of many other famous professors such as Otto Wagner and particularly, Adolf Loos. Most notably, in 1911, he was introduced to the work of Frank Lloyd Wright through the influential Wasmuth Portfolio.

Schindler also met his lifelong friend and rival Richard Neutra at the university in 1912, before completing his thesis project in 1913. Their careers would parallel each other: both would go to Los Angeles through Chicago, be recognized as important early modernists creating new styles suited to the California climate, and sometimes, both would work for the same clients. At one point, they and their wives shared a communal office and living structure that Schindler designed as his home and studio.

== Early professional career ==
In Vienna, Schindler acquired experience in the firm of Hans Mayr and Theodore Mayer, working there from September 1911 to February 1914. Schindler then moved to Chicago to work in the firm of Ottenheimer, Stern, and Reichert (OSR), accepting a cut in pay to be in that progressive American city, which was the home of Frank Lloyd Wright. He found New York City, which he visited along the way, to be crowded, unattractive, and commercial. Chicago was more appealing to him, however, with less congestion and providing access to the architectural work of Henry Hobson Richardson, Louis Sullivan, and Frank Lloyd Wright.

== Establishing contact with Wright ==
Schindler continued to seek contact with Wright, writing letters despite his limited English. He finally met him for the first time on December 30, 1914. Wright had little work at this stage, was still plagued by the destruction of Taliesin and the murder of his mistress earlier that year, and did not offer Schindler a job. Schindler continued work at OSR, keeping himself occupied with trips and study, notably familiarizing himself with the early tilt up slab work of Irving Gill.

Wright was able to hire Schindler after obtaining the commission for the Imperial Hotel in Tokyo, a major project that would keep the architect in Japan for several years. Schindler's role was to continue Wright's American operations in his absence, working out of Wright's Oak Park studio. In 1919, Schindler met and married Pauline Gibling (1893–1977). In 1920, Wright summoned him to Los Angeles to work on the Barnsdall House.

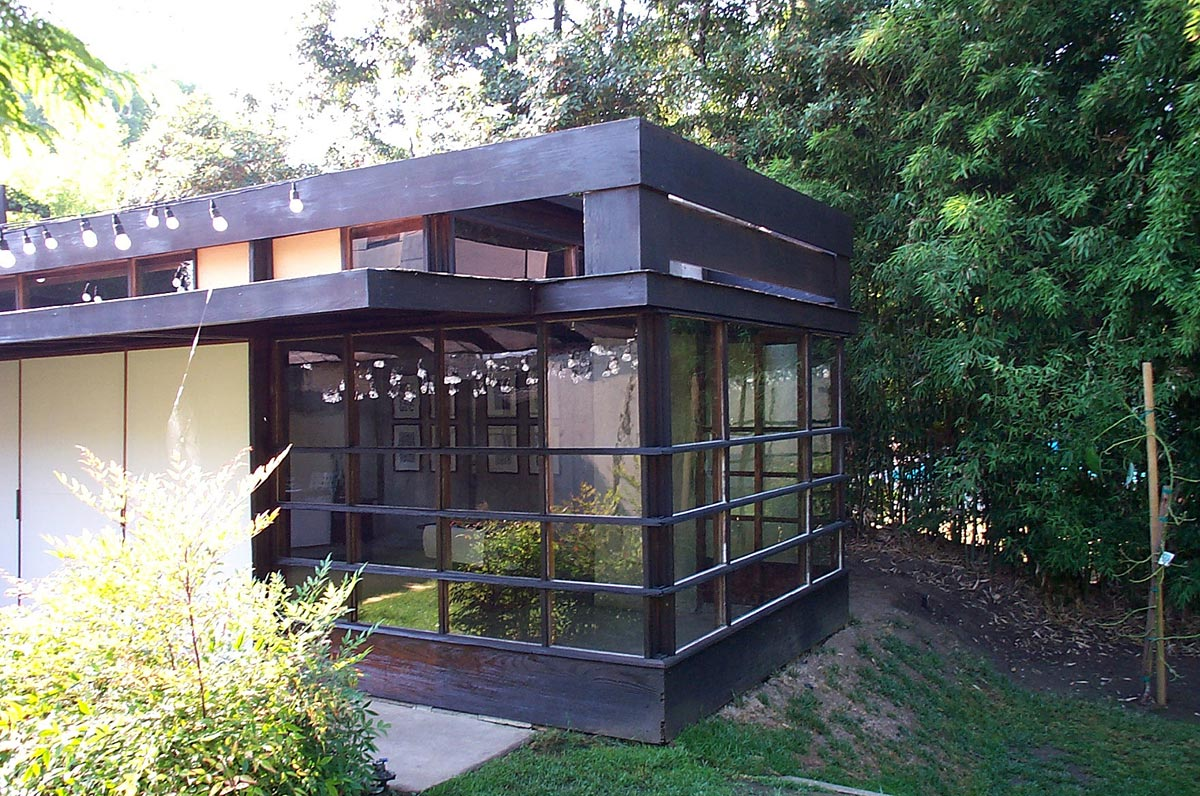
Schindler Chace house in West Hollywood, California – 1922

Schindler was engaged to design several private commissions while in Los Angeles, notably, he completed what many think is his finest building, the Kings Road House, also known as the Schindler house or the Schindler-Chace house, as an office and home for two professional couples by late spring 1922. He and his wife were one of the couples living in the communal structure. He also started to take on several projects of his own.

During this time, fractures started to appear in the Schindler-Wright relationship. Schindler complained, with some validity, of being underpaid and exploited. As well as his architectural affairs, he was running Frank Lloyd Wright's businesses, such as the rental of the Oak Park houses.

Of the houses Wright built in this period, the Hollyhock House was undoubtedly the most significant, for which Schindler did most of the drawings and oversaw the construction, while Frank Lloyd Wright still was in Japan. The client, Aline Barnsdall, subsequently chose Schindler as her architect to design a number of other small projects for her on Olive Hill and a spectacular beach-side 'translucent house' in 1927, which remains one of the great uncompleted projects of the twentieth century.

As Schindler was applying for a Los Angeles license to practice architecture in 1929, he mentioned his extensive work on the architectural and structural plans of the Imperial Hotel. Wright, however, refused to validate these claims. Eventually, disputes over whose work was whose, escalated until Schindler released a flier for a series of talks with Richard Neutra, describing himself as having been, "in charge of the architectural office of Frank Lloyd Wright for two years during his absence". Wright refuted this claim. The two split in 1931 and didn't reconcile until 1953, less than a year before Schindler's death.

== Solo work ==
Schindler's early buildings usually are characterized by concrete construction. The Kings Road House, Pueblo Ribera Court, Lovell Beach House, Wolfe House, and How House are the projects most frequently identified among these.

The Kings Road house was designed as a studio and home for Schindler, his wife, and their friends Clyde and Marian DaCamara Chace. The floor plan worked itself around several L-shapes. Construction features included tilt up concrete panels cast on site, which contrasted with the more 'open' walls of redwood and glass. It has largely become the symbol of Schindler's architecture.

In a search to create a more inexpensive architecture, Schindler abandoned concrete and turned to the plaster-skin design. This type of construction is characteristic of his work throughout the 1930s and 1940s, but his interest in form and space never changed. The Rodriguez House appears in the film Pineapple Express.

He developed his own platform frame system, the Schindler Frame in 1945. His later work uses this system extensively as a basis for experimentation.

== Recognition ==
Schindler's early work, such as the Kings Road House and Lovell Beach House, largely went unnoticed in the wider architectural world. As early and radical as they were for modernism, they may have been too different for recognition and Los Angeles was not a significant location on the architectural map. Schindler was not included in the highly influential International Style exhibit of 1932, while Richard Neutra was and, to add insult to injury, Neutra, incorrectly, was credited as the Austrian who worked on the Imperial Hotel with Wright.

His first major exposure came in Esther McCoy's 'Five California Architects' of 1960. His work is undergoing somewhat of a contemporary revaluation for its inventiveness, character, and formal qualities, which are making his designs familiar to a new generation of architects.

The Mackey Apartments and the Schindler Residence are maintained by the Friends of the Schindler House and the MAK Center for Art and Architecture. The MAK Center offers a variety of exhibitions and events. The center also sponsors six-month residencies for emerging architects and artists who are housed in the Mackey Apartments.

== Selected projects (existing) ==
- 1922 – Schindler House, 835 North Kings Road, West Hollywood, California
- 1922–1926 – Lovell Beach House, Newport Beach, Balboa Peninsula, California
- 1923 – El Pueblo Ribera Court, La Jolla, California
- 1925 – How House for James Eads How, Silverlake, Los Angeles, California
  - City of Los Angeles Historic-Cultural Monument#895
- 1926 – Manola Court apartment building for Herman Sachs, Edgecliff Drive, Los Angeles, California
- 1928 – Wolfe House, Avalon, Catalina Island, California (demolished in 2002)
- 1928–1952 – Samuel Freeman House (two guest apartments and furniture), Hollywood Heights, Los Angeles, California
- 1930 – R. E. Elliot House, Newdale Drive, Los Angeles
  - City of Los Angeles Historic-Cultural Monument#690
- 1933 – W. E. Oliver House, Micheltorena Street, Los Angeles, California
- 1933 – The Rainbow Ballroom, Denver (see also Verne Byers)
- 1934 – J. J. Buck House, Genesee Street, Los Angeles, California
  - City of Los Angeles Historic-Cultural Monument#122
- 1934 – Bennati A-Frame house, Lake Arrowhead, California
- 1935 – DeKeyser Duplex, Hollywood Heights, Los Angeles, California
- 1936 – Ralph G. Walker House, N Kenilworth Ave, Los Angeles, CA
- 1937 – H. Rodakiewicz House, Los Angeles, California
- 1938 – Bubeshko Apartments, Los Angeles, California
  - City of Los Angeles Historic-Cultural Monument#831
  - 2017 Docomomo Award of Excellence for restoration
- 1938 – Wilson House, Los Angeles, California
  - City of Los Angeles Historic-Cultural Monument#965
- 1939 – Mackey Apartments, South Cochran Avenue, Los Angeles, California
- 1940 – Van Dekker House, Woodland Hills, California
- 1940 – House on Ellis Avenue, Inglewood, California
- 1940 – S. Goodwin House, Studio City, California
- 1941 – Druckman Residence, Los Angeles, California
- 1944 – Bethlehem Baptist Church, 4900 S. Compton Ave., Los Angeles, California
- 1946 – Roxy Roth Residence, Studio City, California
- 1948 – Laurelwood Apartments, Studio City, California
  - City of Los Angeles Historic-Cultural Monument#228
- 1950 – Tischler House, Los Angeles, California
  - City of Los Angeles Historic-Cultural Monument#506
- 1952 – Schlesinger House, Los Angeles, California

== Quotes ==
Wright to Schindler, July 1929

"My dear Rodolph Schindler: ...I am in receipt of a letter from the Board asking if you had made designs for me. The answer to that is,-- No you didn't. Nobody makes designs for me. Sometimes if they are in luck, or rather if I am in luck, they make them with me. ...Nevertheless, I believe that you now are competent to design exceedingly good buildings. I believe that anything you would design would take rank in the new work being done in the country as worthy of respect."

— Frank Lloyd Wright
Schindler to Wright, while attempting to apply for his license to practice architecture

"Can't you give me two lines, just two lines of recommendations without any hints at what a great man the boss is and what poor fishes they are in comparison."

— Rudolph Schindler
Schindler to Mrs. Frantl at MOMA in response to an upcoming exhibition, September 1935

"You further called it an exhibition of 'California Architects'. Now it has become one of 'Neutra and others'. I am quite willing to give Neutra the crown for his ability as a publicity man, but I am not willing to sail under his flag as an architect."

— Rudolph Schindler
Schindler to Elisabeth Mock at MOMA, August 1943

"I consider myself the first and still one of the few architects who consciously abandoned stylistic sculptural architecture in order to develop space as a medium of art. ... I believe that outside of Frank Lloyd Wright I am the only architect in U.S. who has attained a distinct local and personal form language."

— Rudolph Schindler

"He has built quite a number of buildings in and around Los Angeles that seem to be admirable from the standpoint of design, and I have not heard of any of them falling down."

— Frank Lloyd Wright

"He has a good mind, is affectionate in disposition, and is fairly honorable I believe. Personally, though strongly individual, he is not unduly eccentric and I, in common with many others, like him very much."

— Frank Lloyd Wright

"Personally, I appreciate Rudolph. He is an incorrigible Bohemian and refuses to allow the Los Angeles barber to apply the razor to the scruff of his neck. He also has peculiarly simple and effective ideas regarding his own personal conduct. I believe, however, that he is capable as an artist. I have found him a too complacent and therefore a rotten superintendent. The buildings that he has recently built in Los Angeles are well designed, but badly executed. I suspect him of trying to give his clients too much for their money. I should say that was his extreme fault in these circumstances of endeavoring to build buildings."

— Frank Lloyd Wright
Wright at Schindler's Memorial Exhibition of 1954

"Rudolph was a patient assistant who seemed well aware of the significance of what I was then doing. His sympathetic appreciation never failed. His talents were adequate to any demands made upon them by me."

— Frank Lloyd Wright

== Films and books ==
In 2024 Schindler Space Architect, a feature-length documentary film by Valentina Ganeva on the life and works of Schindler, was released.

== Other sources ==
- Neutra, Dion (2012). The Neutras Then & Later I (Photography by Julius Shulman). Triton: Barcelona, Los Angeles. ISBN 978-84-938482-7-9.
- Darling, Michael; Smith, Elizabeth A. T. (2001). The Architecture of R.M. Schindler. Harry N. Abrams. ISBN 0-8109-4223-2.
- Sheine, Judith (2001). RM Schindler. Phaidon Press. ISBN 0-7148-3914-0.
- Leclerc, David (October 1996). "Schindler: La maison Wolfe". L'Architecture d'Aujourd'hui. 307.
- March, Lionel; Scheine, Judith (1995). RM Schindler: Composition and Construction. Academy Press. ISBN 1-85490-423-X.
- Gebhard, David (1971). Schindler. Viking Press. ISBN 0-670-62063-7.
  - reprinted in 1980 by Peregrine Smith
  - reprinted in 1997 by William Stout Publishers
- McCoy, Esther (1960). Five California Architects. Reinhold Publishing.
  - reprinted in 1975 by Praeger
