= Boynton Township, Tazewell County, Illinois =

Coordinates: 40°21′35″N 89°25′33″W

Boynton Township
- Township
- Location in Tazewell County
- Country: United States
- State: Illinois
- County: Tazewell
- Established: Unknown

Area
  - Total: 29.59 sq mi (76.6 km^{2})
  - Land: 29.59 sq mi (76.6 km^{2})
  - Water: 0 sq mi (0 km^{2}) 0%

Population (2010)
  - Estimate (2016): 267
  - Density: 9.3/sq mi (3.6/km^{2})
- Time zone: UTC-6 (CST)
  - Summer (DST): UTC-5 (CDT)
- FIPS code: 17-179-07627

Boynton Township is located in Tazewell County, Illinois. As of the 2010 census, its population was 275 and it contained 94 housing units. Formed as Boyington Township in November, 1854, but the name was changed to Boynton on an unknown date.

== Geography ==
According to the 2010 census, the township has a total area of 29.59 square miles (76.6 km^{2}), all land.

== Demographics ==
Historical population
Census	Pop.	Note	%±
2016 (est.)	267
U.S. Decennial Census
