= Torchil de Bovington =

11th-century landowner in Norman England

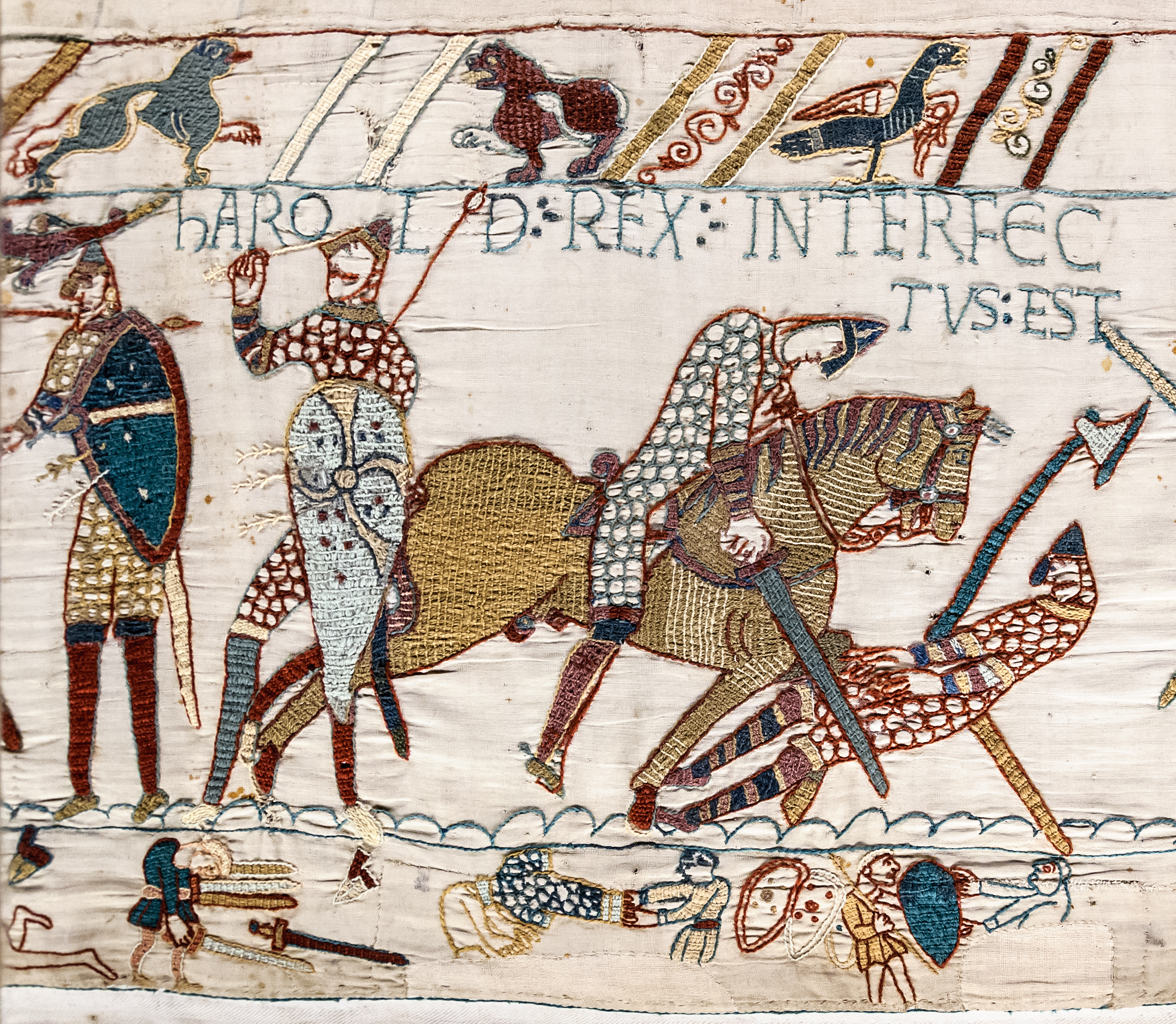
Bayeux Tapestry - the death of King Harold at the Battle of Hastings. One of the few surviving visual representations of how the landowning class of Torchil's time saw the world.

Torchil de Bovington (or Boynton) was an 11th-century landowner in Norman England.

William the Conqueror's Domesday survey of England was taken in 1086, listing both those who had land before the Norman Conquest of 1066 and who held it in 1086. Torchil (or Turchil) is mentioned as a landowner sixty-four times. He held over 60 manors, either alone or in conjunction with others, and almost all were located in Yorkshire.
