= Bovingdon Hall Woods =

Protected area in Essex, England

Coordinates: 51.929°N 0.557°E

- Site of Special Scientific Interest
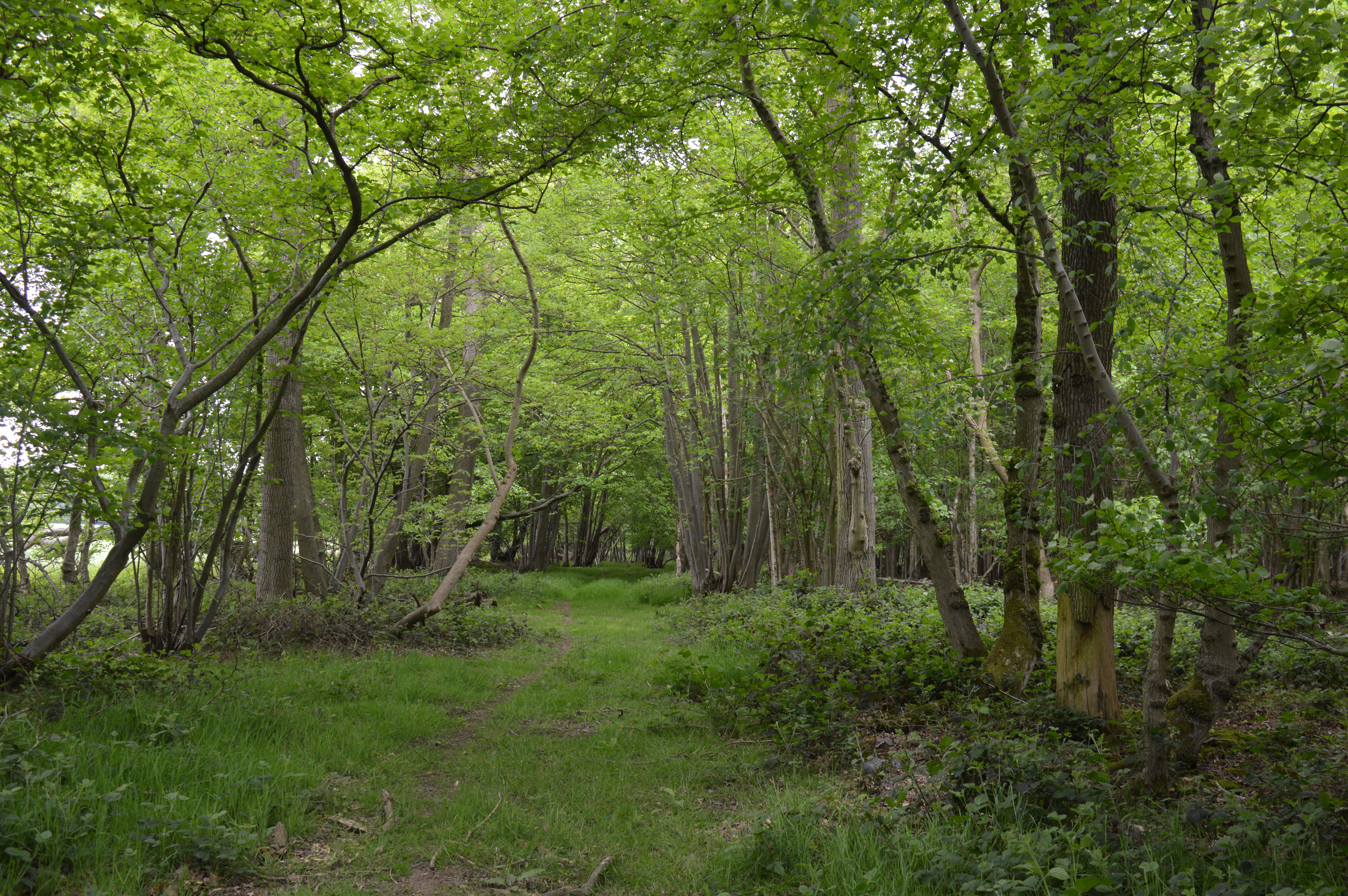
- Parkhall Wood
- Location of Bovingdon Hall Woods.
- Area of search: Essex
- Grid reference: TL752290; TL758286; TL758283; TL762279
- Interest: Biological
- Area: 69.4 ha (171 acres)
- Notification date: 1986
- Location map: Magic Map

Bovingdon Hall Woods is a 69.4-hectare (171-acre) biological Site of Special Scientific Interest north of Braintree in Essex. It is composed of several woods, including Parkhall Wood, Bovingdon Wood, Shoulder of Mutton Wood, and Maid's Wood.

The site is coppice woodland of medieval origin on chalky boulder clay. It has unusual woodland types, such as small-leaved lime and plateau alder. Other trees include sessile and pedunculate oak, ash, maple and hornbeam, with occasional wild service tree. The understory has elder, hazel, field maple and hawthorn, while the ground flora is donated by bramble. There are many natural ponds and dells.

The site is private land with no public access.
