= Boyington =

Surname

Boyington is a surname. Notable people with the surname include:

- William W. Boyington (1818–1898), U.S. architect
- Pappy Boyington (1912–1988), U.S. fighter pilot of World War II
- Jessica Boyington (born 1985), U.S. beauty queen

== See also ==
- Boynton (disambiguation)
