= Stuart Richardson House =

Building in New Jersey, United States

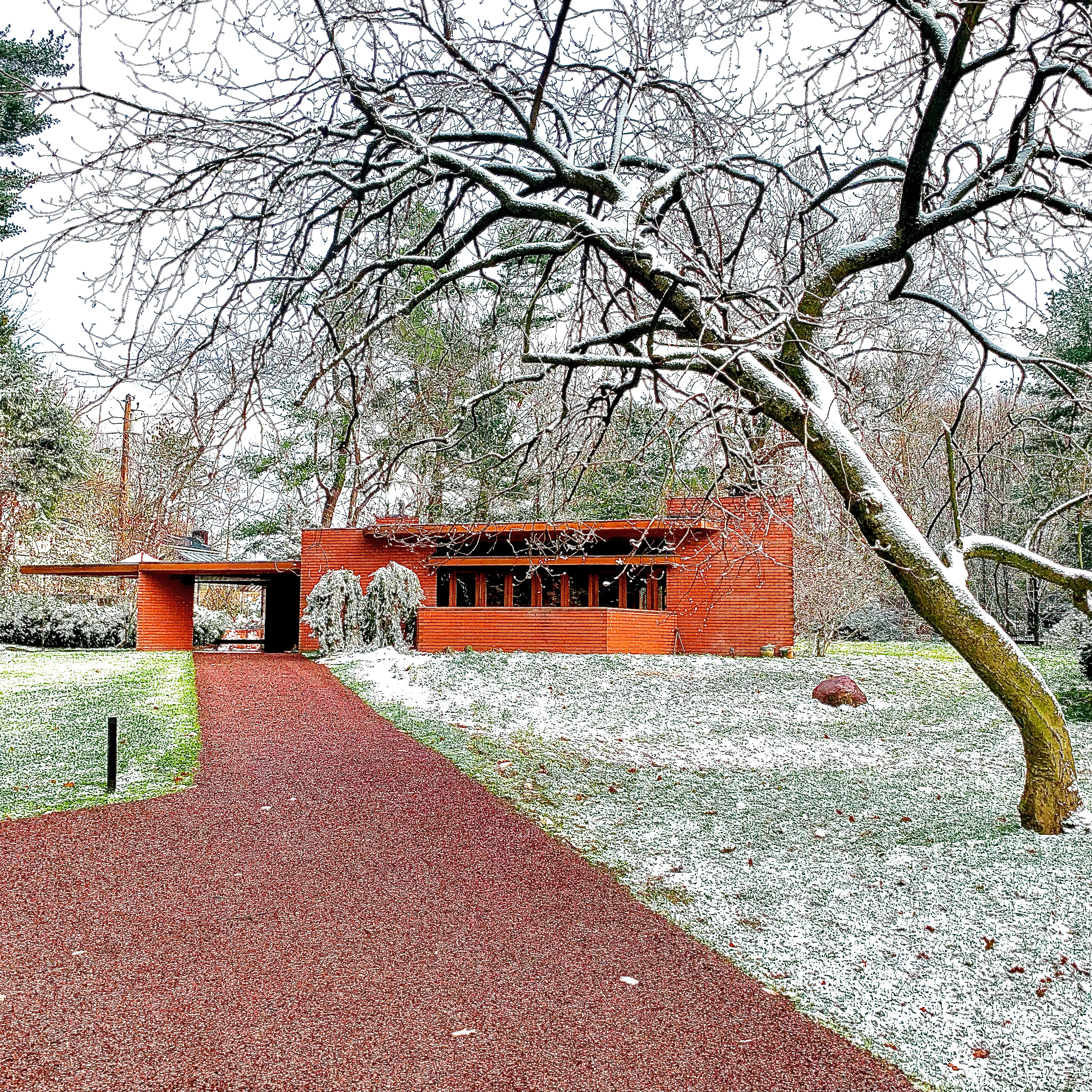
Frank Lloyd Wright 'Stuart Richardson House' (1941) exterior

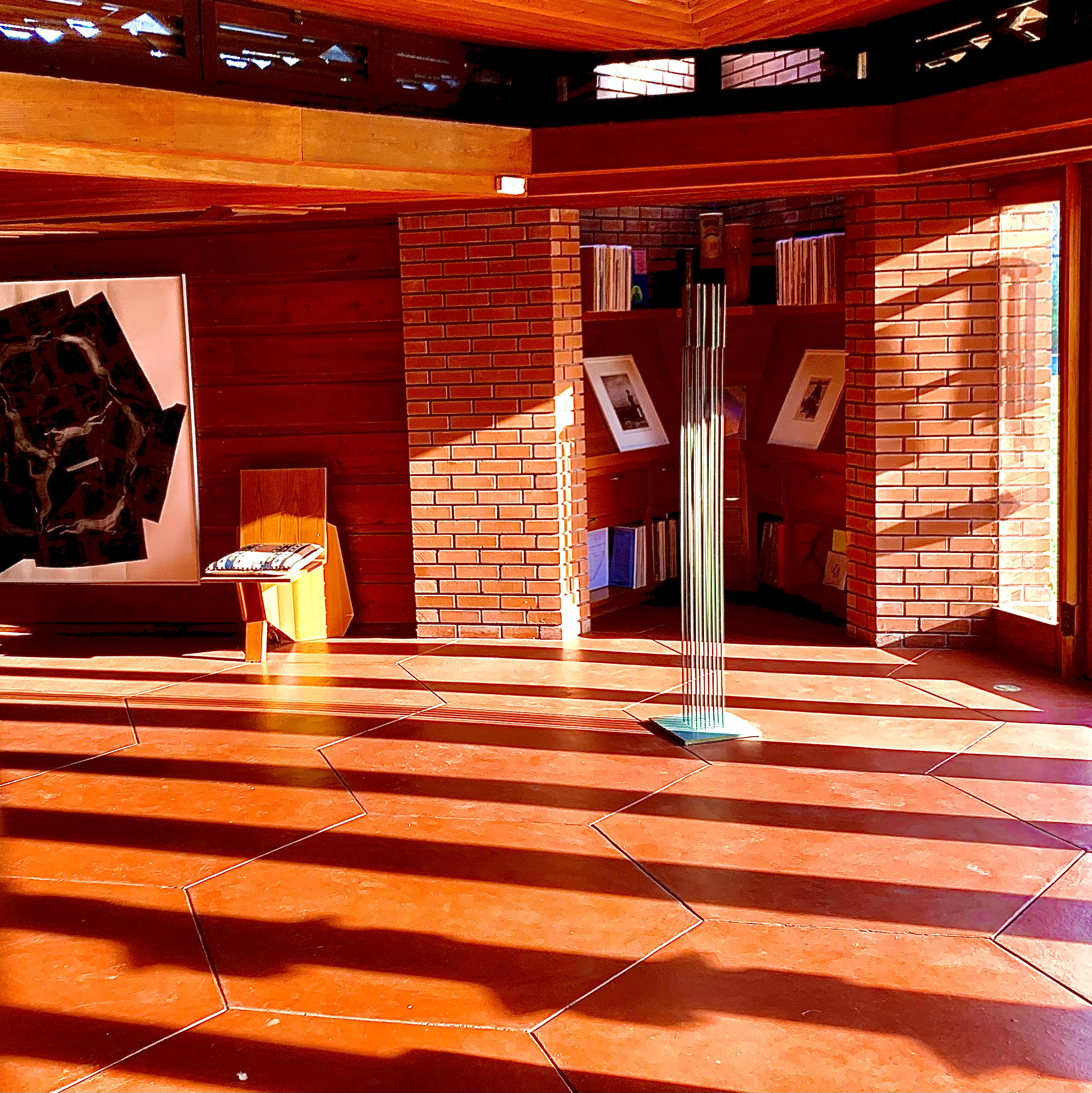
Frank Lloyd Wright 'Stuart Richardson House' (1941) interior

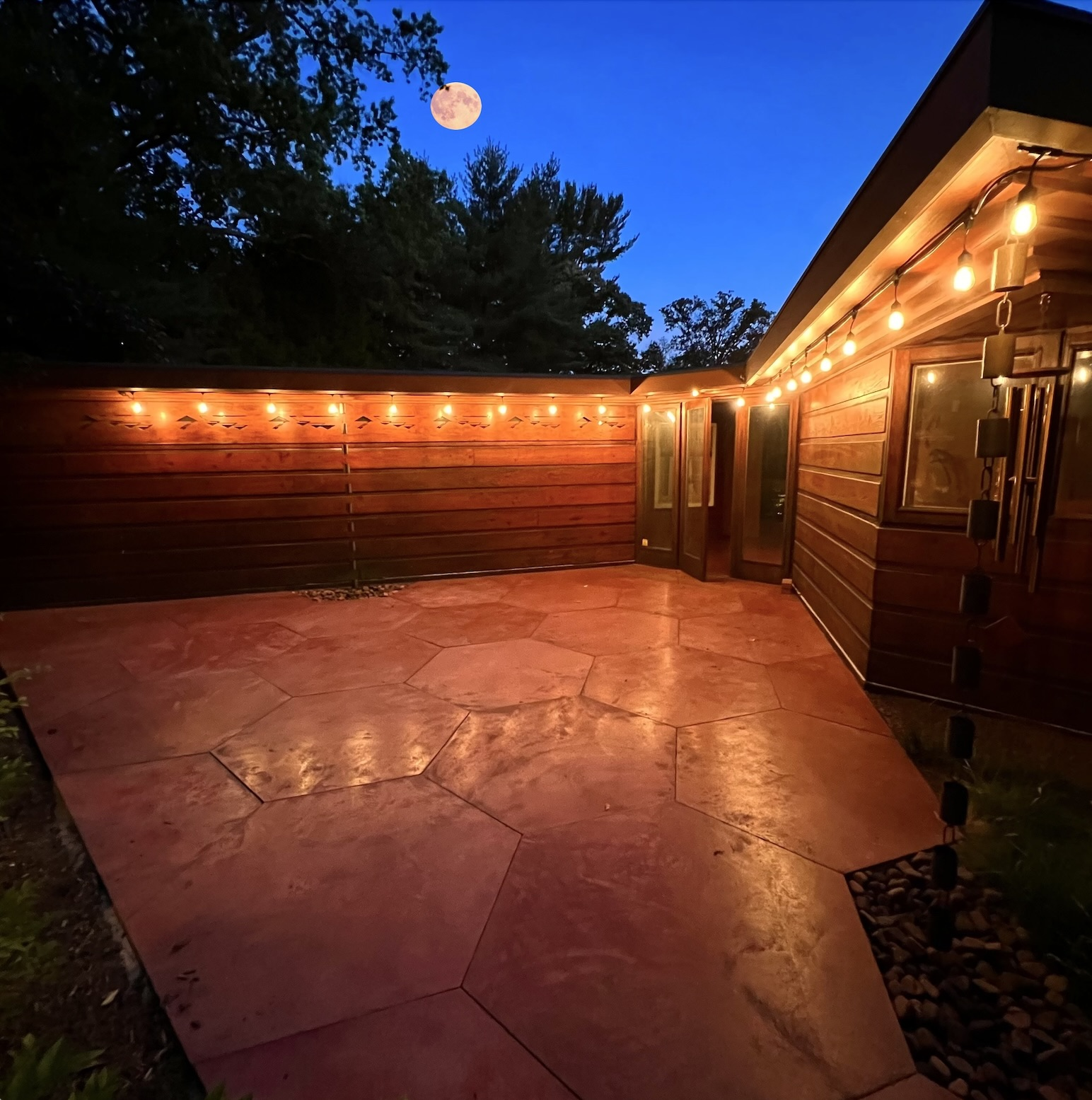
Frank Lloyd Wright 'Stuart Richardson House' (1941) exterior

The Stuart Richardson House is a Usonian-style residence in Glen Ridge, Essex County, New Jersey, United States. Affectionately named "Scherzo" by its architect Frank Lloyd Wright, it was designed in 1941 and built in 1951 for actuary Stuart Richardson and his wife Elisabeth. The Richardsons, with their two daughters Margot and Edith, moved in on October 23, 1951, and owned the house until 1970. The primary building construction materials employed in the design of the house were red brick, old growth tidewater cypress wood, and glass on a Cherokee-red radiant heated concrete floor mat. The building spans 1,800 square feet (170 m^{2}).

The Richardson House, originally designed for a site in Livingston, New Jersey, was built a decade later in Glen Ridge due to complexities imposed by World War II. The design is a rare example of a Wright-designed Usonian home with 60- and 120-degree angles. Tucked into a landscaped woodland meadow with a stream, multiple ponds, and waterfalls running along its private entry invisible from the street, it is 20 miles (32 km) from midtown Manhattan. The home's centerpiece is a massive triangular living–dining space with prow-like wood-burning fireplace, an inverted pyramidal ceiling unlike any other known to be designed by Wright, and illuminated perforated clerestory windows. Fourteen full height French doors create two window walls opening onto balconies and an in-ground heated swimming pool surrounded by a flagstone terrace on the south side of the home. On the north side of the home off the bedroom loggia is a large triangular planted terrace providing additional outdoor living space. There is a master suite with separate bedroom, dressing area, and master bath. The home also includes a carport, entry loggia, large kitchen, library–studio, two bedrooms, a guest bathroom, and mechanical room. Every room contains the original desks, dressers, shelving, tables, chairs, and credenzas designed by Wright, and there is ample storage space integrated throughout the home.

A 2006 restoration by previous owners Edith and John Payne with New Jersey-based TARANTINOarchitect returned The Richardson House to the integrity and beauty FLLW originally envisioned, and earned the 2010 Frank Lloyd Wright Building Conservancy Spirit Award. Payne sold the house in 2016. The house was listed for sale again in 2019.

== See also ==
- List of Frank Lloyd Wright works
