= Cedric G. and Patricia Neils Boulter House =

Historic house in Cincinnati, Ohio

- Cedric G. Boulter and Patricia Neils House
- U.S. National Register of Historic Places
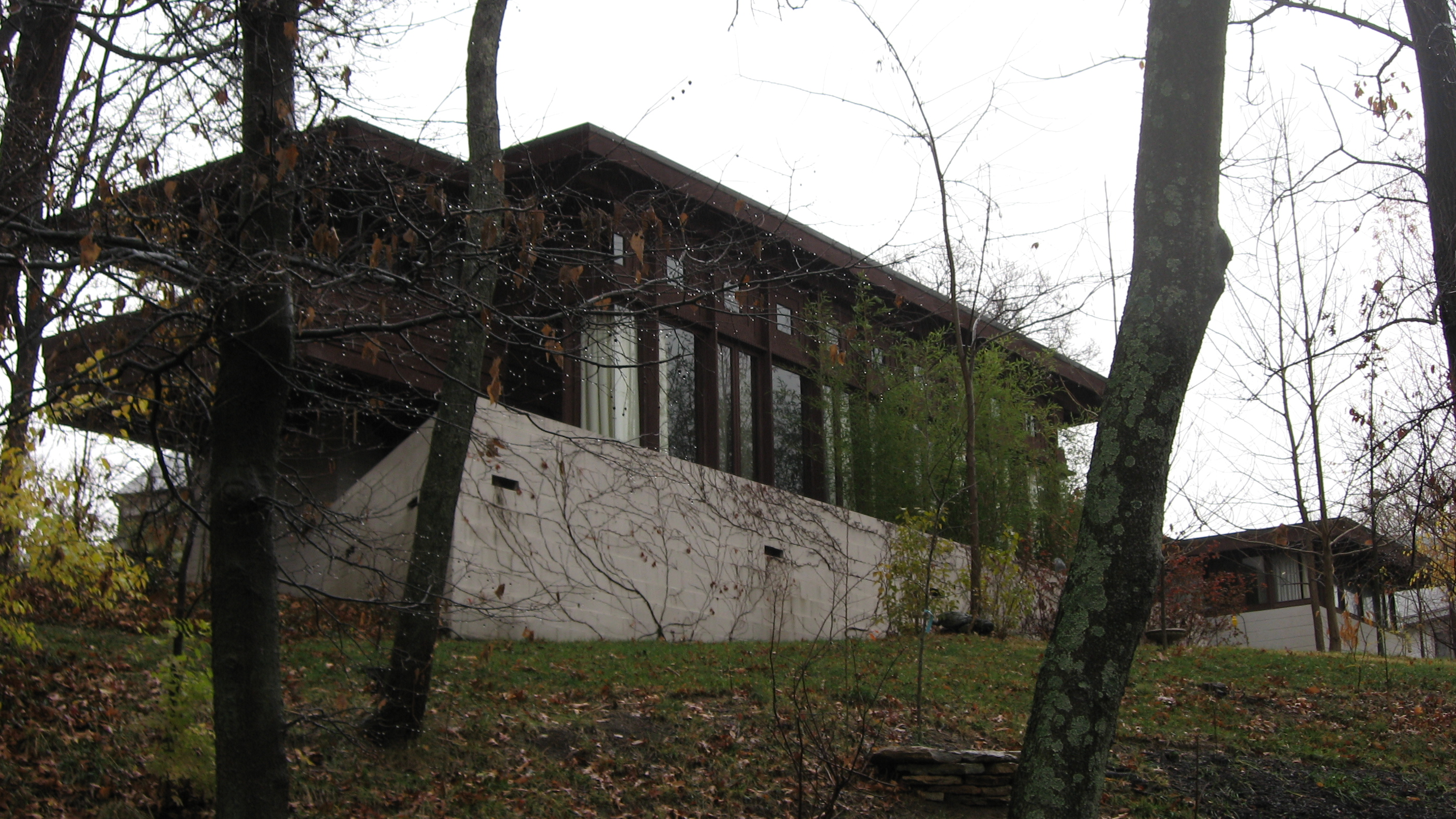

- Location within Ohio Location within the United States
- Interactive map showing the location of Cedric H. and Patricia Neils Boulter House
- Location: 1 Rawson Woods Circle, Cincinnati, Ohio
- Coordinates: 39°09′06.7″N 84°31′22.9″W
- Built: 1956
- Architect: Frank Lloyd Wright
- Architectural style: Usonian
- NRHP reference No.: 99000512
- Added to NRHP: May 14, 1999

Cedric G. Boulter and Patricia Neils House is a Frank Lloyd Wright-designed house in the Clifton neighborhood of Cincinnati, Ohio, United States. It was commissioned in 1953, with construction beginning in 1954, and completed in 1956. Additions to the design were completed in 1958.

In 1949, Patricia's parents commissioned the Frieda and Henry J. Neils House in Minnesota and Wright promised to design a home for her when she married.

The building was listed in the National Register of Historic Places on May 14, 1999.

== History ==
Cedric and Patricia (Neils) Boulter were classics professors at the University of Cincinnati. Wright designed them a Usonian style house with a square module of 4 feet on a side. The house uses concrete block, with Douglas fir used as a structural wood.(Storrer, 407) The home is a split level, with the second floor (which has the first bathroom, the Master Bedroom and a study) overlooking the living room. Construction was initially completed in 1956 with plans for another bedroom and bath on the other side of the carport. These were completed two years later under the direction of Benjamin "Ben" Dombar, original construction manager, former member of the Taliesin Fellowship and area architect.

The Boulters lived in the home until the 1980s. After the death of Cedric, Patricia sold the home to David and Miriam Gosling. The Goslings had the building placed on the National Register of Historic Places and enclosed the carport. The third owners were Chuck Lohre and Janet Groeber who worked on the house for 15 years. They carried out needed restoration work, updated the kitchen, and addressed energy efficiency as possible.

When they were ready to sell the home, they put it on auction in February 2019. Their intention, as they said, was to get a buyer sensitive to owning a Wright structure. The home was at auction for one day and was purchased site-unseen by Brook Smith, with the intention of "using the house as a retreat space for creatives. A fire occurred at the house in August 2019 while the owner was absent. It was estimated to cause US$100,000 in damages.

The home was sold via private sale to venture capitalists Candice Matthews Brackeen and Brian Brackeen, on March 15, 2021.

== See also ==
- List of Frank Lloyd Wright works
