= George Sturges House =

House in Los Angeles, California

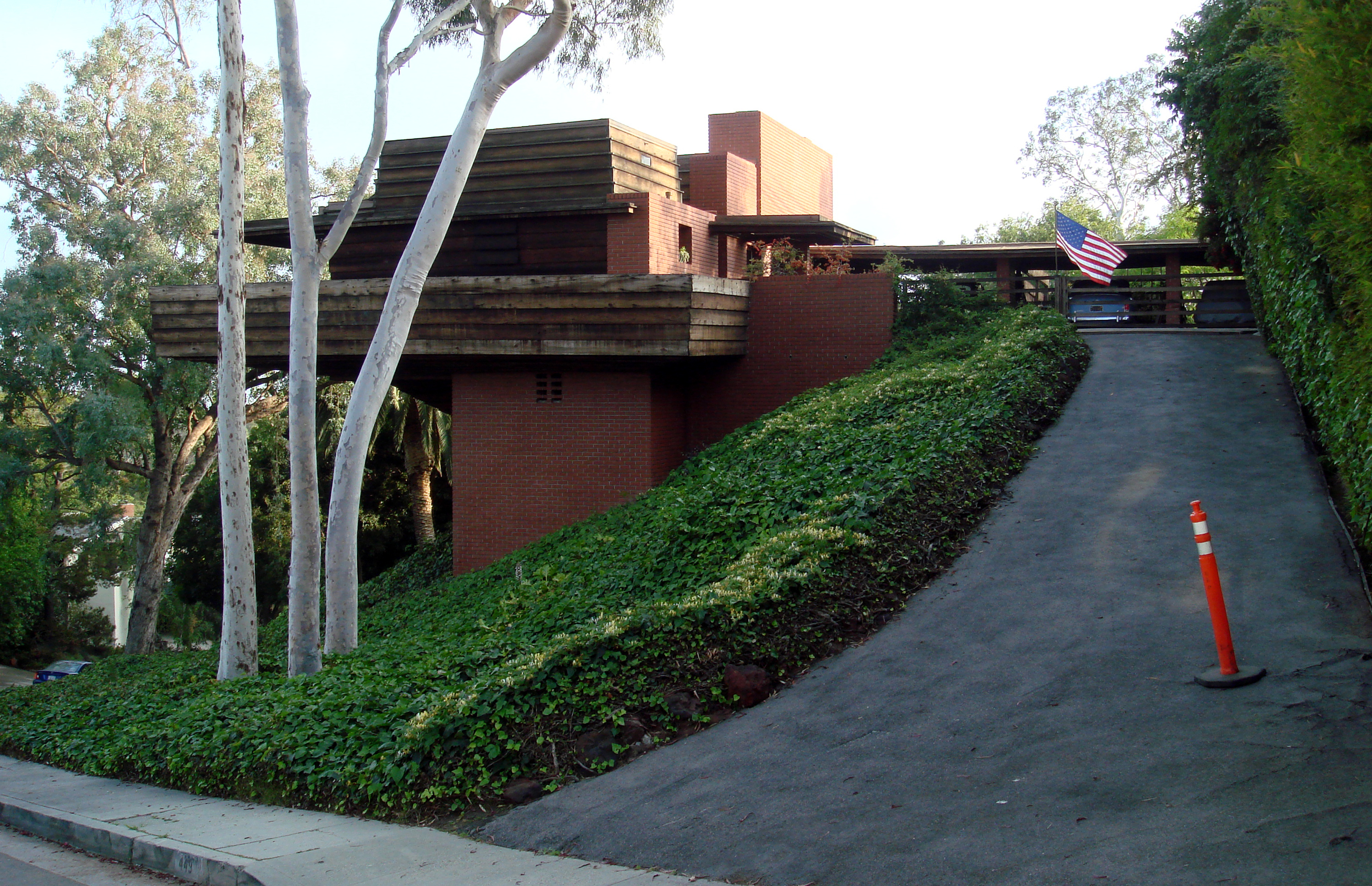
- Interactive map of the George Sturges House area

General information
- Architectural style: Usonian
- Location: Los Angeles, United States
- Coordinates: 34°04′00.78″N 118°28′52.51″W
- Completed: 1939
- Client: George D. Sturges

Design and construction
- Architect: Frank Lloyd Wright

Los Angeles Historic-Cultural Monument
- Designated: May 25, 1993
- Reference no.: 577

The George Sturges House is a single-family house, designed by architect Frank Lloyd Wright and built for George D. Sturges in the Brentwood Heights neighborhood of Brentwood, Los Angeles, California. Designed and built in 1939, the one-story residence is fairly small compared to 21st century standards, 1,200 square feet (110 m^{2}), but features a 21-foot panoramic deck. The home is made out of concrete, steel, brick and redwood. Wright hired Taliesin fellow John Lautner to oversee its construction.

The Sturges House is the only structure in Southern California built in Wright's modern Usonian style. Other Wright homes in the area were built in the 1920s as textile block houses, including the Ennis House.

The George Sturges House can be viewed easily from the street (449 N. Skyewiay Road). It was designated as Los Angeles Historic-Cultural Monument #577 on May 25, 1993.

From 1967 until his death in 2015, the house was owned by actor Jack Larson. After Larson's death, the house was to be put up for auction, with the proceeds to benefit the nonprofit Bridges/Larson Foundation. In February 2016 Los Angeles Modern Auctions announced that no qualified bidder had registered, and it was withdrawn. The All Right Now Foundation obtained the house that December, but the new owner did not cooperate with the Los Angeles Conservancy and Frank Lloyd Wright Building Conservancy on a preservation plan. By 2026, the Sturges House was in such poor shape that the Los Angeles Conservancy had listed the house on its watch list of endangered buildings. At the time, some of the cladding had fallen off or had warped.

== See also ==
- List of Frank Lloyd Wright works
