= Seamour and Gerte Shavin House =

Historic house in Tennessee, United States

- U.S. National Register of Historic Places
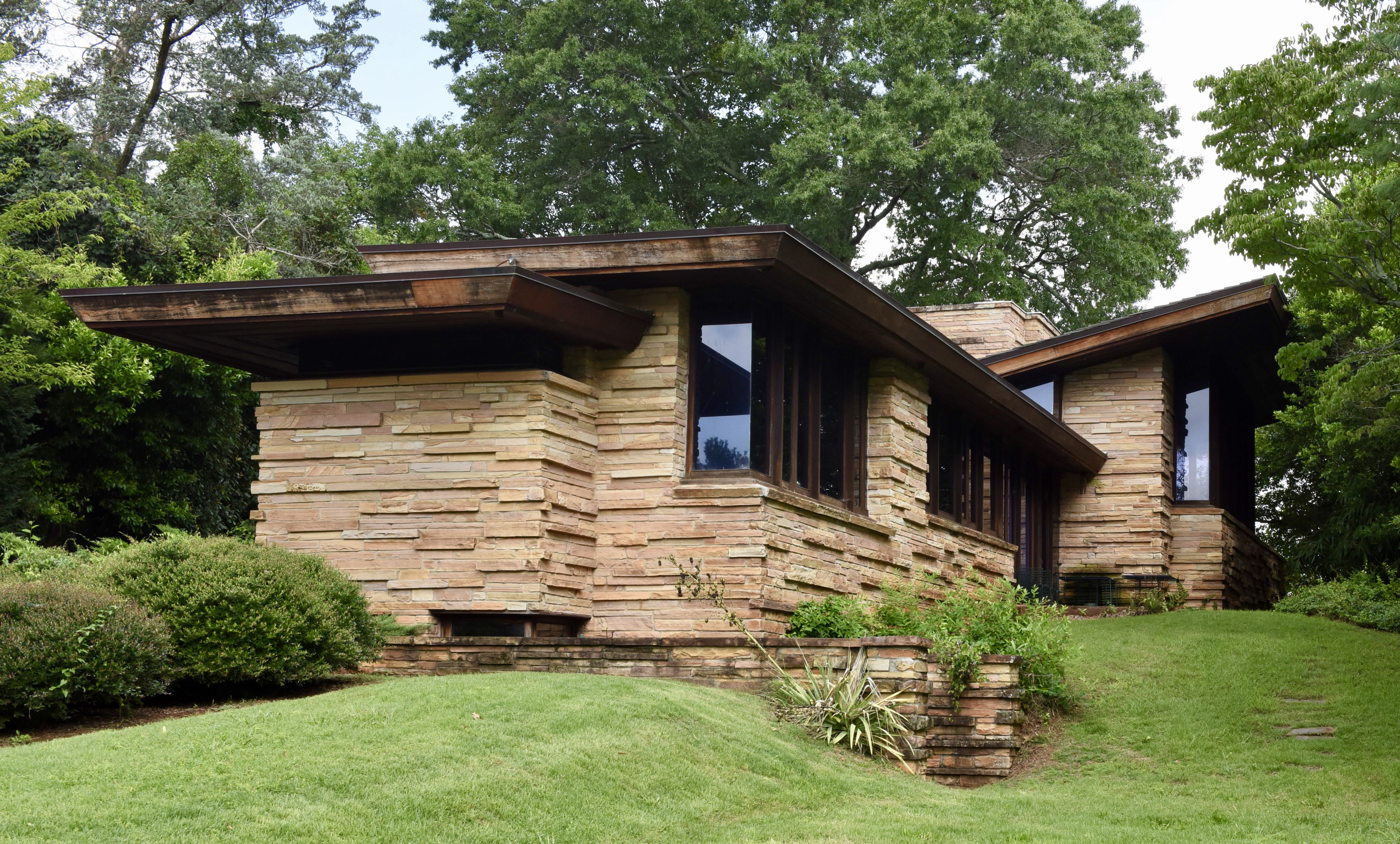

- Location within Tennessee
- Location: Chattanooga, Tennessee
- Coordinates: 35°3′7.203″N 85°15′0.8994″W
- Area: 2000 sq. ft.
- Built: 1952
- Architect: Frank Lloyd Wright
- Architectural style: Usonian
- NRHP reference No.: 93000149
- Added to NRHP: March 23, 1993

The Seamour and Gerte Shavin House is a Usonian home in Chattanooga, Tennessee that was designed by Frank Lloyd Wright. The house was added to the National Register of Historic Places in 1993.

== History ==
The house was commissioned by newlyweds Seamour and Gerte Shavin in 1949 and the home at 334 North Crest Road on Missionary Ridge in Chattanooga was completed in 1952. Seamour was a building materials salesman. It is the only building designed by Frank Lloyd Wright in Tennessee. Both the exterior and interior of the house use primarily crab orchard stone and treated Louisiana cypress wood. The stonework is reminiscent of Fallingwater: laid horizontally, stones are allowed to protrude (or "stick out") at points from the line of the wall, resembling stone ledges.

The house is sited on top of a hill to take advantage of the view of the Tennessee River and Lookout Mountain. The home features a kitchen, den and bathroom at the top of the hill, and sleeping areas down some stairs on the lower, or eastern, side of the hill. The den/living room is the focal point of the home, featuring a large stone fireplace. Mitered glass in one corner and wood framed corner glass doors that open outward allow the eyes to wander both outside the home and around the interior.

There are many classic Wright details, such as a stunning example of a 12-by-16-by-16-foot (3.7 m × 4.9 m × 4.9 m) cantilevered roof over the carport that is similar to the Goetsch–Winckler House. There are double clerestory windows with cut-wood light screens. The home has a hidden entrance. The Shavins' house contains built-ins and furniture designed by Wright, resulting in a unified design scheme.

Wright, who died in 1959, never visited the site of the Shavins' house during or after its construction. Marvin Bachman, an apprentice of Wright, supervised the construction. In 1951, Bachman was killed in an automobile accident. During the summer of 1952, Bachman's sister, Gloria, and her husband, Dr. Abraham Wilson visited Seamour and Gerte Shavin and helped them move into their new home. On the drive back to New Jersey, the couple decided to commission Wright to design the Bachman–Wilson House.

Seamour died in 2005, while the couple still lived in the home. Gerte continued to divide her time between Chattanooga and Leesburg, Virginia, where the couple lived part-time since the 1990s. In June 2026, the residence was listed for sale at $1.6 million. In August 2026, the home was sold for $4 million to a couple from middle Tennessee.

== See also ==
- National Register of Historic Places listings in Hamilton County, Tennessee
- List of Frank Lloyd Wright works
