= Frank Sander Residence =

Frank S. Sander House (Springbough)
- Location within Connecticut

General information
- Type: House
- Architectural style: Usonian
- Location: Stamford, Connecticut
- Coordinates: 41.119949°N 73.581424°W
- Construction started: 1955

Technical details
- Floor area: 2,200 sq ft

Design and construction
- Architect: Frank Lloyd Wright

The Frank S. Sander House ("Springbough") is a 2,200-square-foot (200 m^{2}) house located in Stamford, Connecticut. It was designed by the noted architect Frank Lloyd Wright in 1952.

Springbough is composed of mahogany, burnt face brick and glass and is built into the side of a rocky ledge. The house was restored in 1996 by Anne Del Gaudio.

In 2002 the house was toured by participants of the Frank Lloyd Wright Building Conservancy meeting in New York.

== See also ==
- List of Frank Lloyd Wright works
