= Dr. Richard and Mrs. Margaret Martin House =

Historic house in Tennessee, United States

- Dr. Richard and Mrs Margaret Martin House
- U.S. National Register of Historic Places
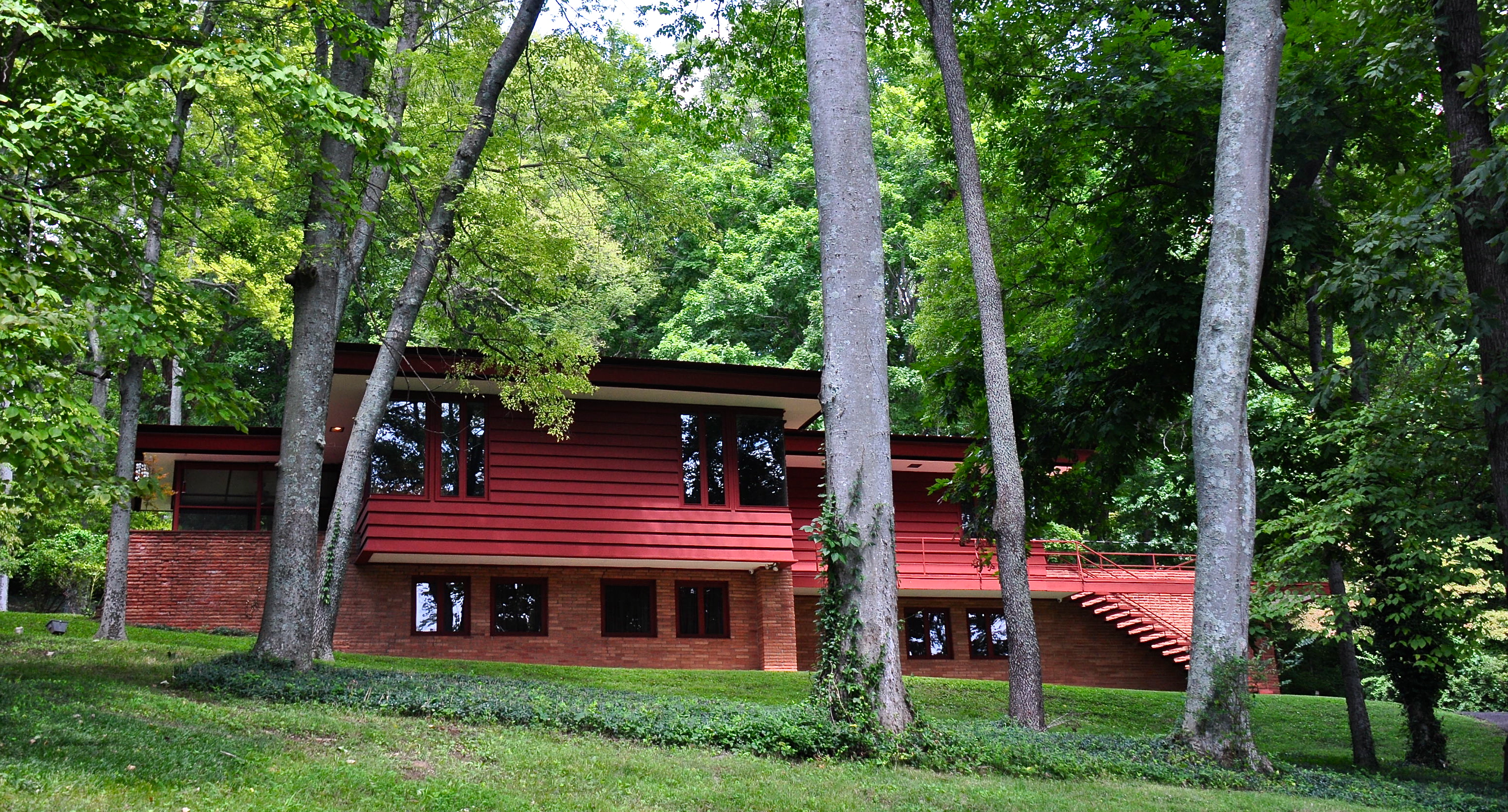
- The house in 2014

- Location within Tennessee
- Location: 825 Kendall Drive, Nashville, Tennessee
- Coordinates: 36°8′2″N 86°51′53″W
- Area: 1 acre (0.40 ha)
- Built: 1956
- Architectural style: Modern Movement
- NRHP reference No.: 07000188
- Added to NRHP: March 22, 2007

The Dr. Richard and Mrs. Margaret Martin House is a historic house in Nashville, Tennessee, U.S. It was built in 1956 for Dr. Richard Martin and his wife, Margaret. It was designed by architect Robert Bruce Draper, who was an apprentice of Frank Lloyd Wright. The home was designed with influence from the Usonian architectural style. It has been listed on the National Register of Historic Places since March 22, 2007.
