= Tracy House =

House in Normandy Park, Washington, US

- U.S. National Register of Historic Places
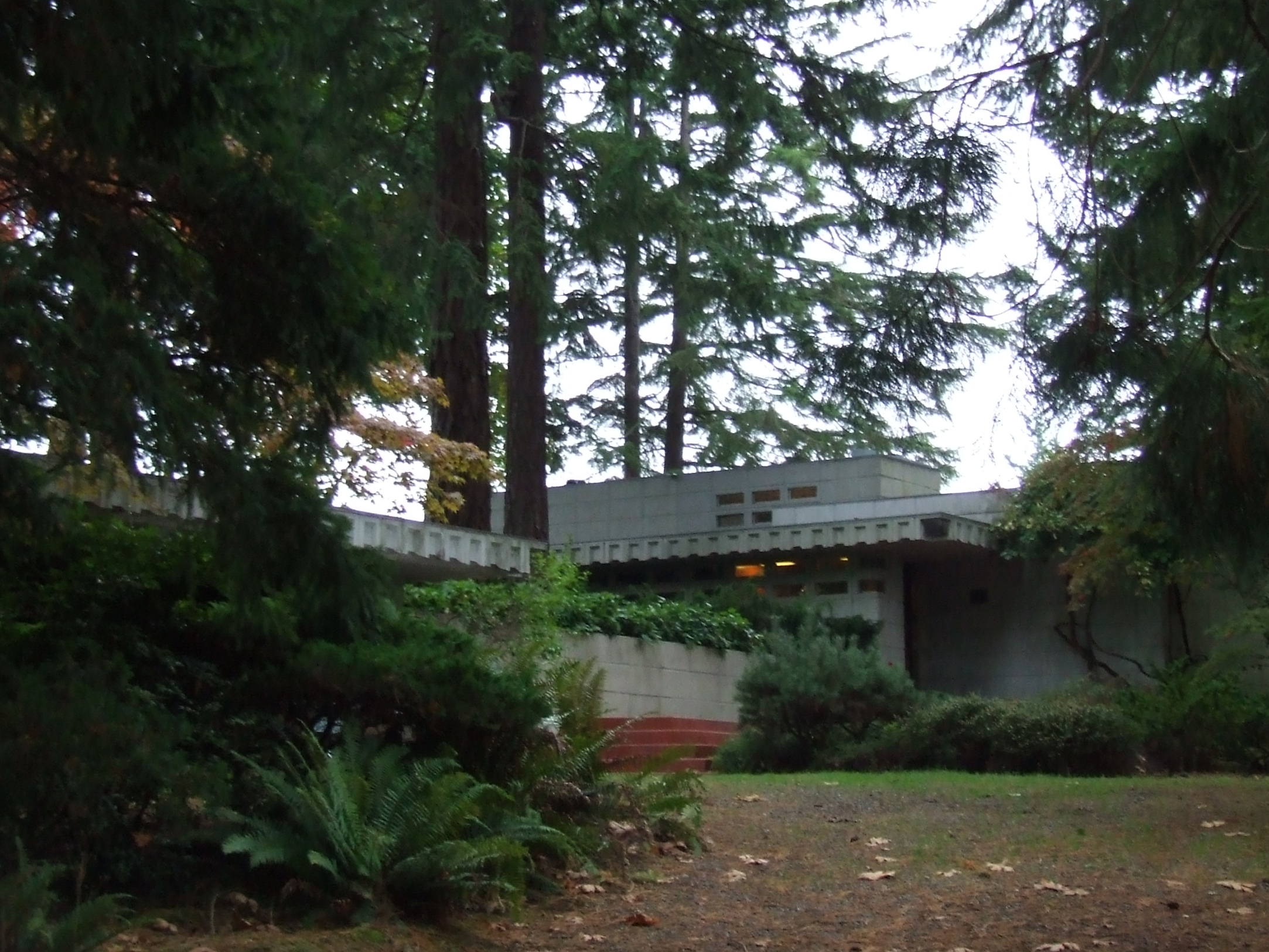

- Location within Washington (state)
- Location: 18971 Edgecliff Dr SW; Normandy Park, Washington
- Coordinates: 47°25′52.64″N 122°21′1.95″W
- Built: 1956
- Architect: Frank Lloyd Wright
- Architectural style: Usonian
- NRHP reference No.: 95000830
- Added to NRHP: July 13, 1995

The Tracy House (also known as the Bill and Elizabeth Tracy House) is a Frank Lloyd Wright-designed Usonian Automatic home that was constructed in Normandy Park, Washington, a suburb near Seattle, in 1956.

The house, like other Wright-designed Usonian automatics, is composed of concrete blocks that is broken up by glass and redwood plywood. The Tracy House is 1,150 square feet (107 m^{2}) and has three bedrooms and one bathroom as well as a two-car garage; the lot itself is 31,000 square feet (2,900 m^{2}) and faces the Puget Sound.

The Tracy House was built for Bill and Elizabeth Tracy, who occupied it until the latter's death in 2012; the property was listed on the real estate market for the first time at a price of $950,000.

In 2011, Seattle Met named it one of the ten greatest homes in the Seattle area.

== See also ==
- List of Frank Lloyd Wright works
