= Dorothy H. Turkel House =

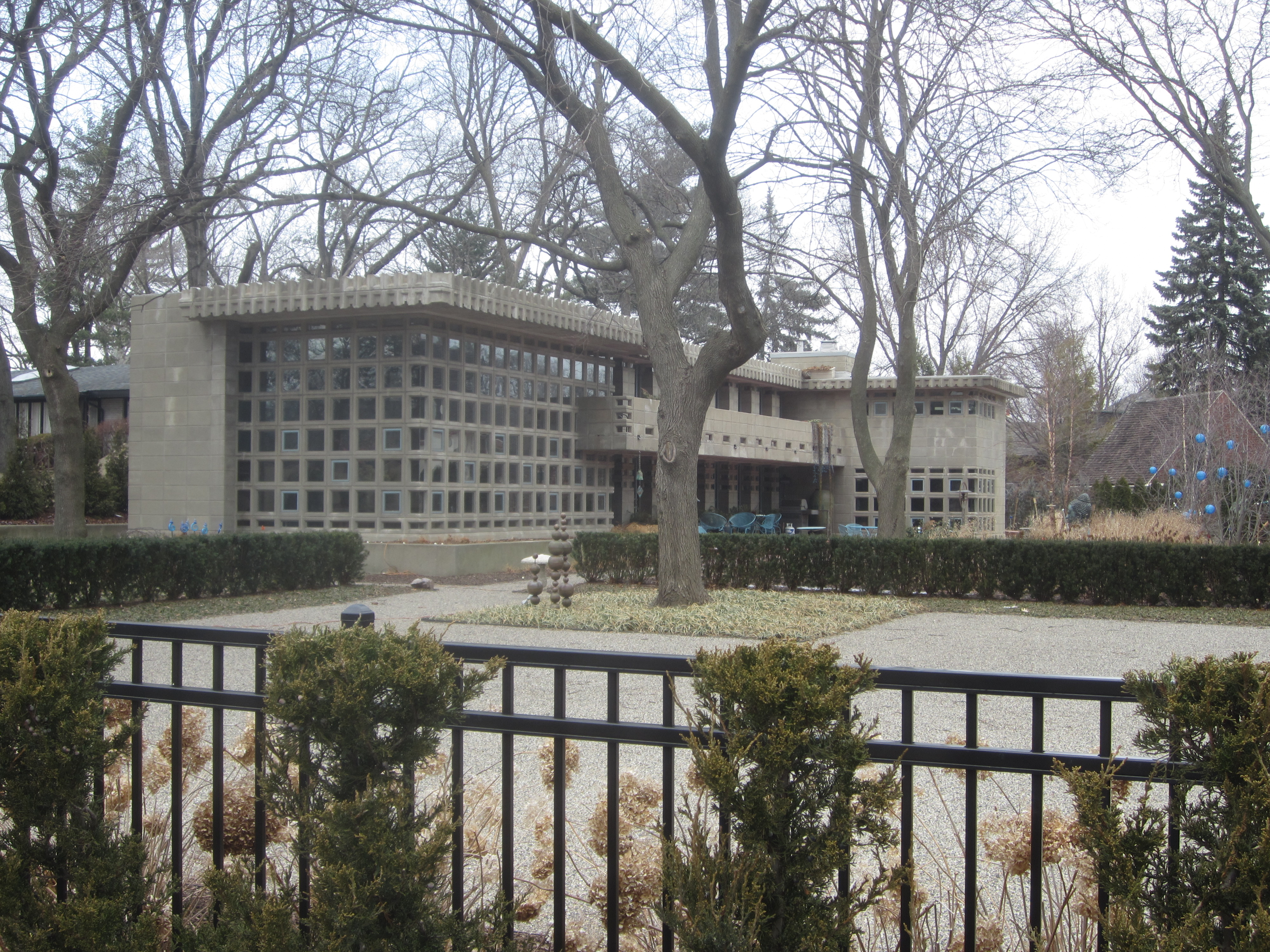
- Interactive map of the Dorothy H. Turkel House area

General information
- Architectural style: Usonian
- Location: 2760 West 7 Mile Road; Detroit, Michigan
- Coordinates: 42.432363°N 83.130865°W
- Completed: 1956

Design and construction
- Architect: Frank Lloyd Wright

The Dorothy H. Turkel House is a private residence located at 2760 West 7 Mile Road in north-central Detroit, Michigan, within the Palmer Woods neighborhood. It was designed by Frank Lloyd Wright and completed in 1956.

The Dorothy H. Turkel House is the only Wright-designed building within the city limits of Detroit. The spacious, two-story residence also represents a rare example of Usonian design, since the "Usonian Homes" were typically small, single-story dwellings. The house was purchased in 2006 by Norman Silk and Dale Morgan, who began restoration work on the house with former Wright apprentice, Lawrence R. Brink. The restoration was complete in 2010, at a reported cost of one million dollars.

== Gallery ==
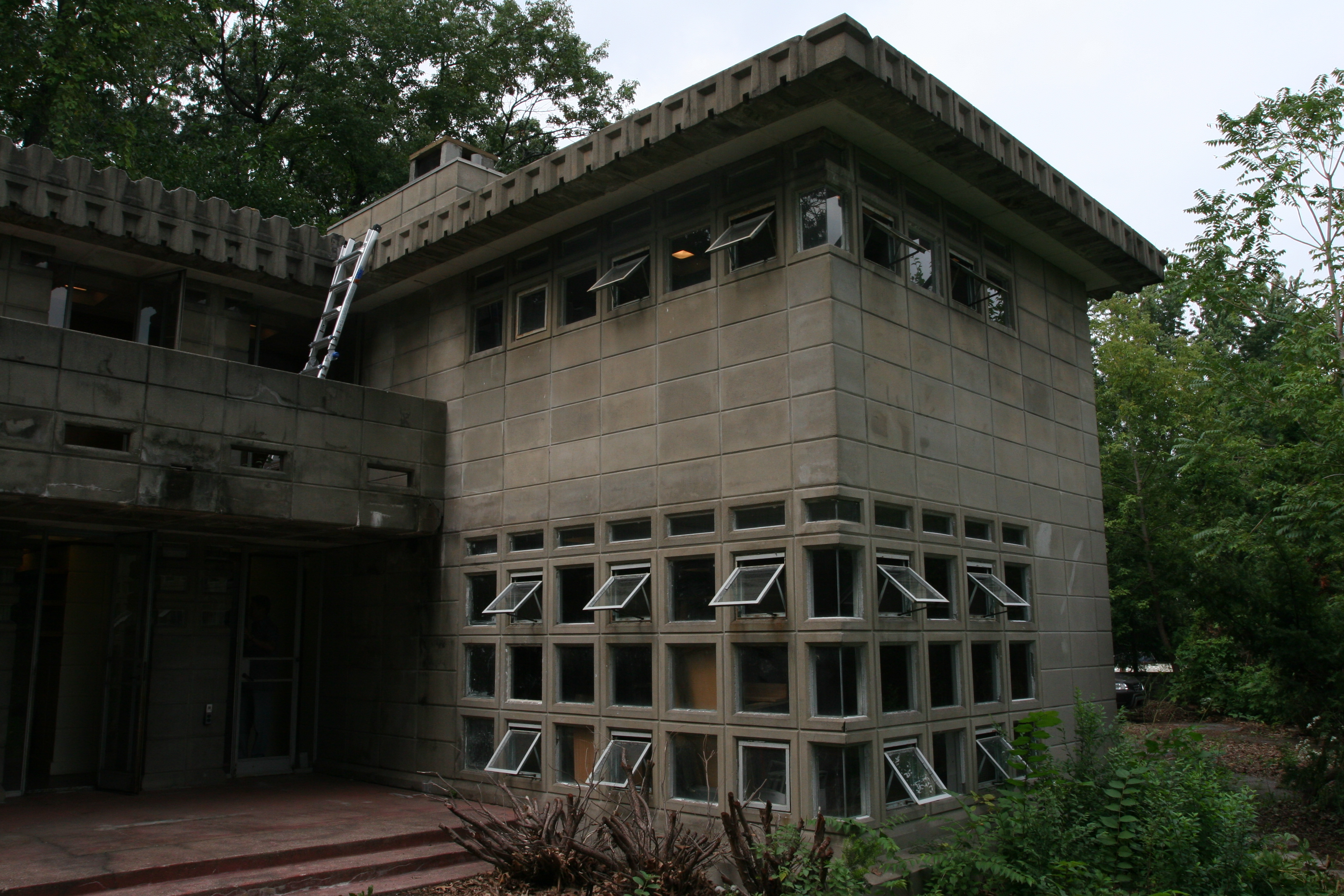
Exterior

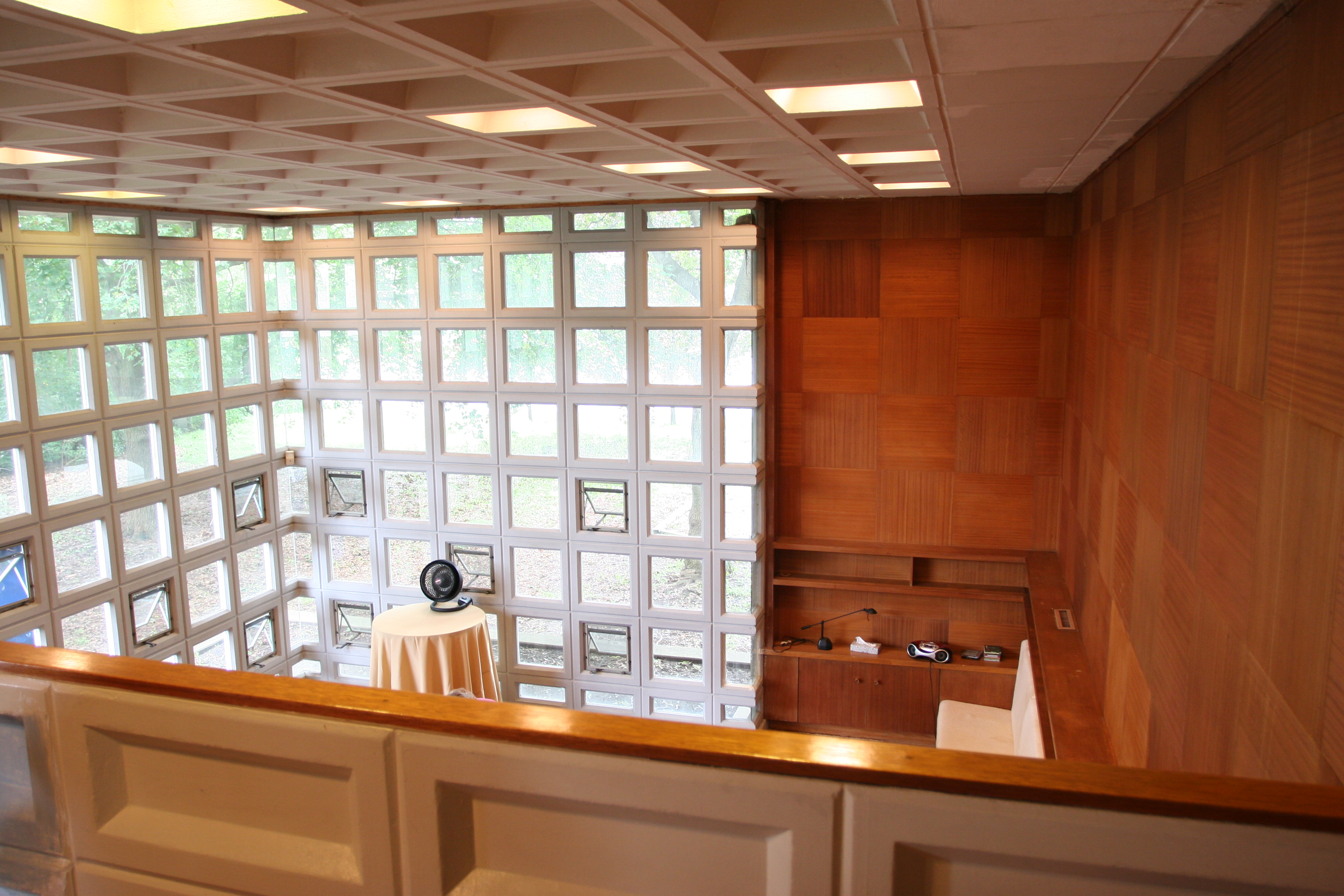
Living room from balcony

== See also ==
- List of Frank Lloyd Wright works
