= John C. Pew House =

House in Shorewood Hills, Wisconsin

Coordinates: 43°04′53″N 89°27′25″W

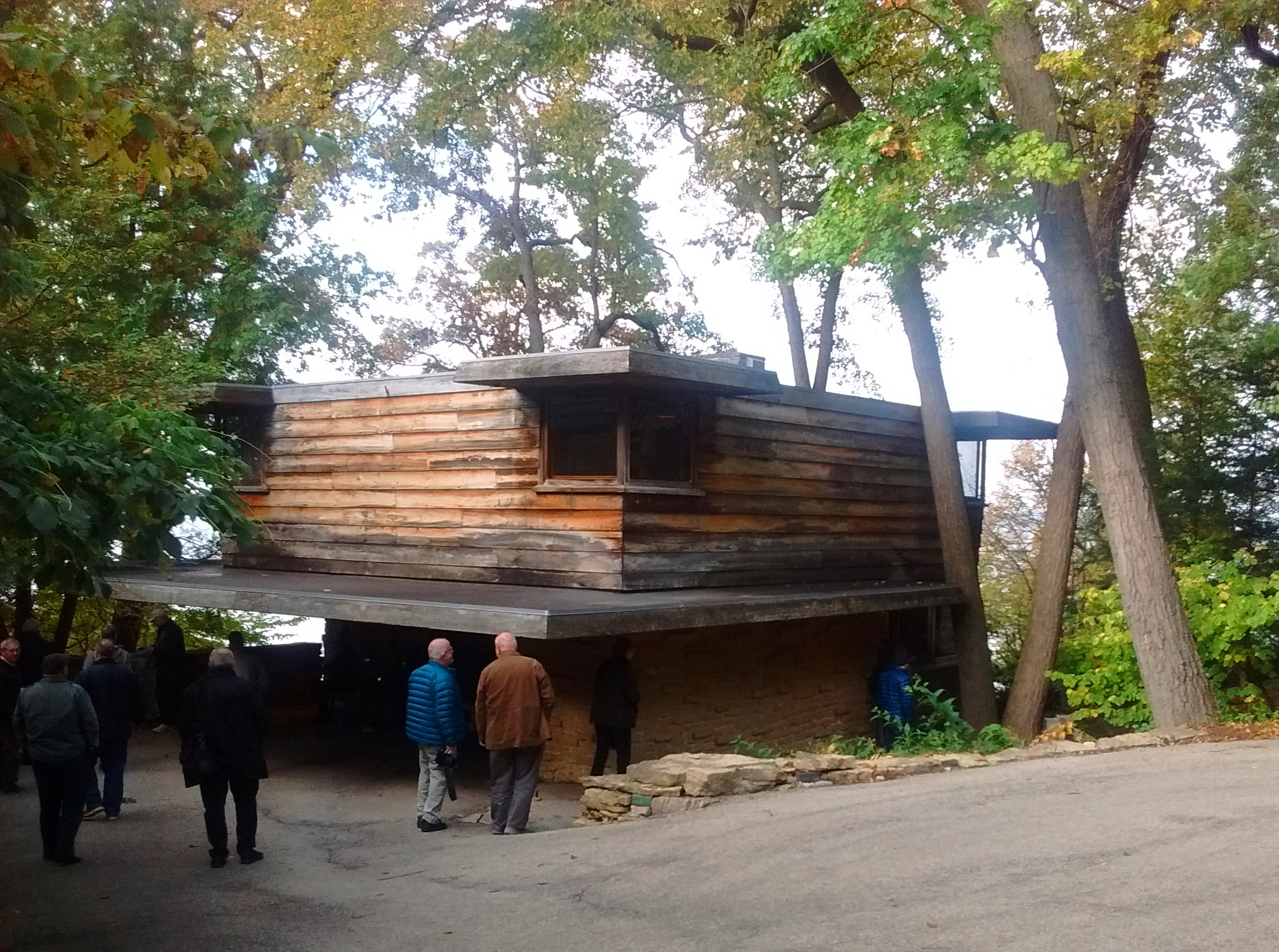
Looking northeast at the Pew House.

The John C. Pew House, also known as the Ruth and John C. Pew House, is located at 3650 Lake Mendota Drive, Shorewood Hills, Wisconsin. It was designed by American architect Frank Lloyd Wright in 1938 for research chemist John Pew and his wife, Ruth. Built on a narrow lot, the two-story home steps down the sloping hill to the shore of Madison's Lake Mendota. A home in Wright's Usonian style, the building was meant to be economical: its cost was US$8,750 (equivalent to $195,458 in 2024). The building is placed at an angle, relative to the lot, giving two of sides of the house views of the lake. Construction was supervised by a member of Wright's Taliesin Fellowship, William Wesley "Wes" Peters (who was also Wright's son-in-law). Peters said to Wright about the building that, "I guess you can call the Pew house a poor man's Fallingwater." To which Wright was to have replied, "No, Fallingwater is the rich man's Pew House."

The current owner is Eliot Butler.

== See also ==
- List of Frank Lloyd Wright works
