= Weltzheimer/Johnson House =

Historic house in Oberlin, Ohio

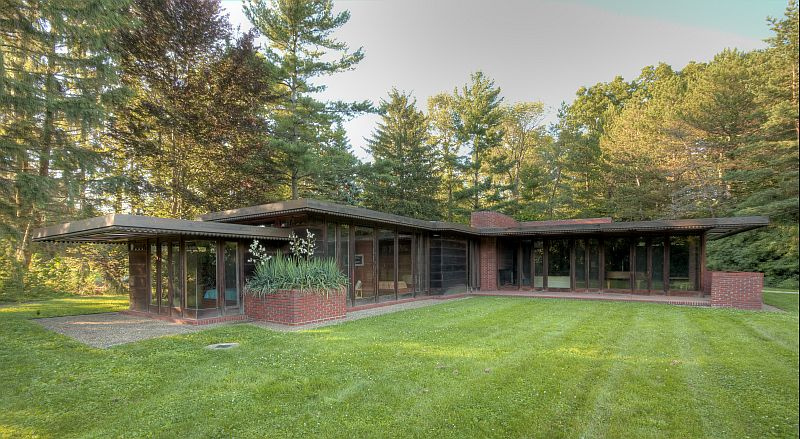

- Location within Ohio
- Interactive map showing the Weltzheimer House

General information
- Architectural style: Usonian
- Location: Oberlin, Ohio, United States
- Coordinates: 41.287449°N 82.236890°W
- Construction started: May 1948
- Completed: April 1949
- Cost: $30,000 – $45,000
- Client: Charles and Margaret Weltzheimer

Design and construction
- Architect: Frank Lloyd Wright

The Weltzheimer/Johnson House is a Usonian style house designed by Frank Lloyd Wright in Oberlin, Ohio. It was constructed in 1948 and 1949. Now owned by Oberlin College, it is operated as part of the Allen Memorial Art Museum. The house was originally named the Charles Weltzheimer Residence.

== Style ==
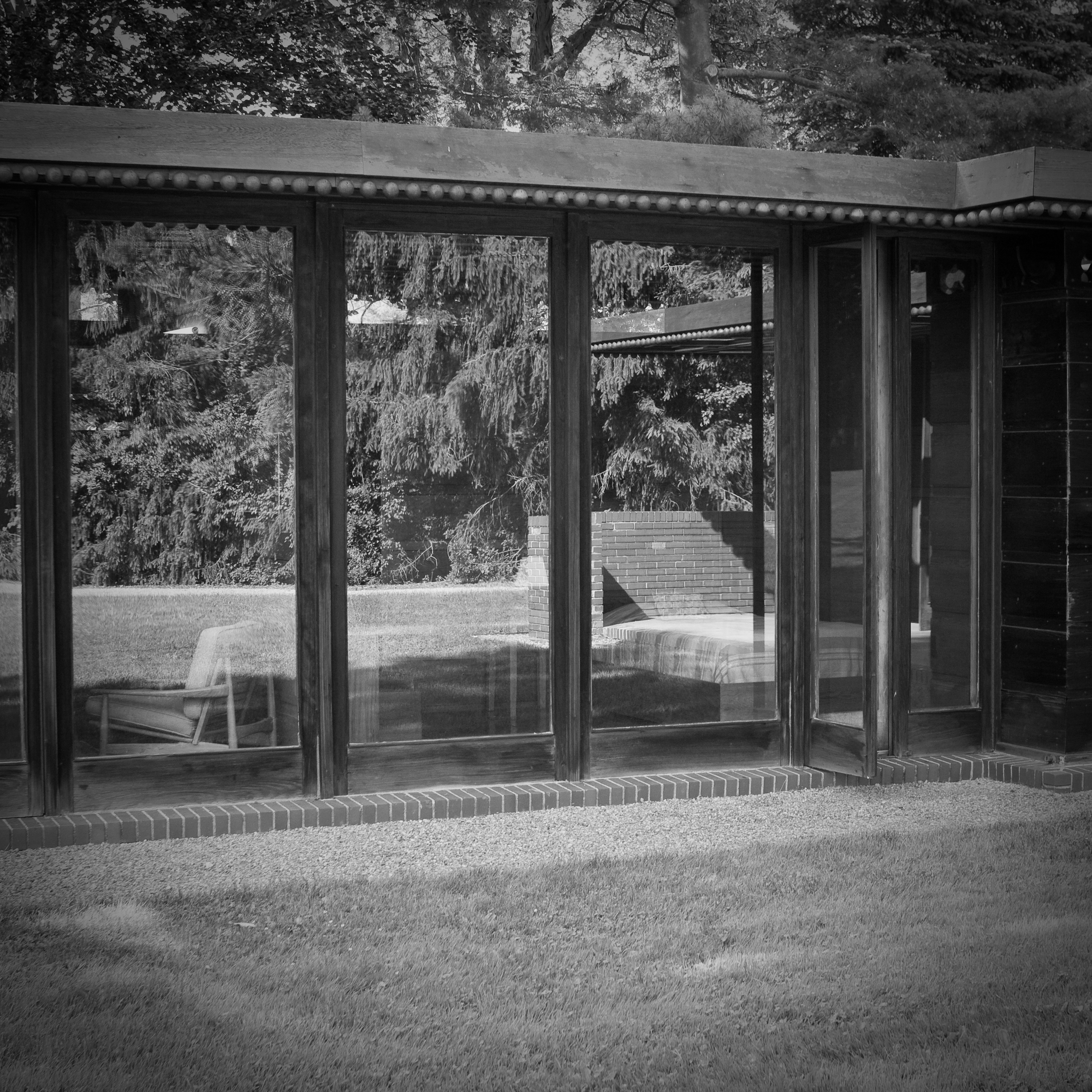

The first of nine Usonian homes to be built in Ohio, the house bears the typical features of the Usonian style: brick construction, an L-shaped plan, a flat roof with large overhangs and a carport. The Weltzheimer house is, however, unusual in a number of respects. For instance, it is rare in its use of redwood which forms the ceiling and exterior walls of the home. The unusually elaborate curvilinear motifs in the panels in the clerestory are unique to this house. Wright himself also created a detailed landscape plan for the property.

The Weltzheimer/Johnson House stands as another expression of Wright's answer to the demand for beautiful and affordable middle-class homes in post-World War II America. Pairing innovation with basic owner-builder construction materials and techniques, the concepts of organic architecture evolved into these Usonian characteristics: a flowing floor plan with distinct public and private wings, a grid-patterned concrete slab floor with radiant heat, a flat roof and cantilevered carport, masonry fireplace mass, board and batten walls with simple built-in furniture, and tall glass walls and doors opening to the landscape.

The Weltzheimer/Johnson House uses brick masonry and redwood and has several distinctive features, including the hundreds of stained balls forming the roof dentil ornamentation whose circular motif is echoed in the shadow panel screens of the clerestory and the interior brick columns that separate the living room from the "workspace," Wright's name for the kitchen in his Usonian homes.

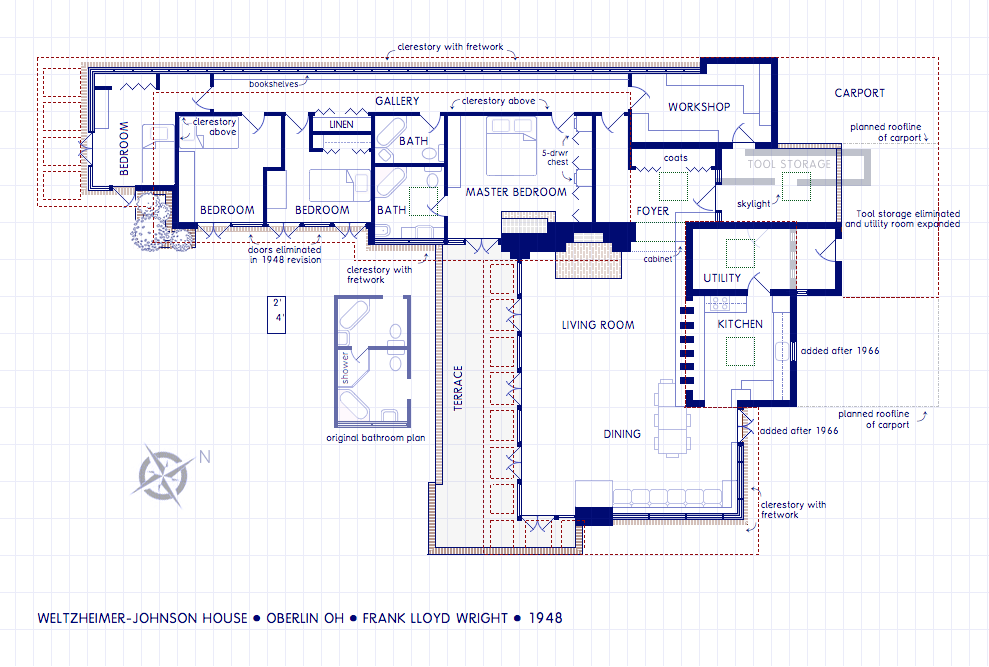
Floor plan

== History ==
The house was commissioned by Charles and Margaret Weltzheimer in 1947, a year after they moved to Oberlin to live near a business Charles was a part-owner of. The original budget for the project was $15,000, but the final cost was two to three times that, possibly as much as $50,000, precise records having been either lost or not kept in the first place. The first plans were delivered in May 1948, and although much interior work remained to be completed, the family moved into the house in April 1949. An apprentice from Taliesin oversaw construction; Wright himself never visited the site.

The house was angled in the lot, both to maximize exposure to the winter sun and to enhance views of surrounding property. The landscape plan for the property included a small orchard of fruit trees planted in diagonal rows that matched the orientation of the house; a gravel drive along the eastern edge of the property and "berry bushes" on the western and southern edges. A rectangular garden was planned adjacent to the bedroom wing and perennial borders extended selected wall out into the landscape. The Weltzheimers loosely followed Wright's plan, including planting the orchard, though they never strictly adhered to it.

The house remained in the Weltzheimer family until the early 1960s. The next two owners made drastic changes to the property. They first removed many of the original plantings and planted numerous trees close to the house, breaking the visual connection from the interior to the exterior. One owner also installed a brick column to support a sagging roof overhang. A speculator bought the house in 1966 and subdivided the property into four lots. The house was painted and downspouts were added. Inside, white formica countertops and mahogany cabinets were installed in the kitchen. Other significant changes were made in every room of the house.

In 1968 the home was purchased by Ellen H. Johnson, a Professor of Modern Art at Oberlin College. She bought the house to prevent further damage and soon embarked on a daunting restoration that continued for the 25 years that she owned the house. Johnson also began to undo some of the changes to the landscape to restore the feeling of serenity and connectedness that Wright intended.

In the 1970s, concerned about the future of the house, Ellen Johnson made arrangements for the house to be transferred to Oberlin College upon her death. To ensure that the home would be properly maintained and that the college would not dispose of it, she also arranged for a maintenance endowment.

Ellen Johnson died in 1992, and the house was transferred to Oberlin College. Today the house is operated by the Allen Memorial Art Museum and holds public open house hours on the first Sunday of each month. As of 2009, the Weltzheimer/Johnson House has begun seasonal closings to preserve the house and protect it from extreme wear-and-tear. The house is now closed December through February, reopening for public open house tours in April.

== See also ==
- List of Frank Lloyd Wright works
