= Hause House =

Unbuilt design by Frank Lloyd Wright

The Hause House project was one of the many un-built works designed by the architect Frank Lloyd Wright in 1939. This building structure was one of his Usonian designs that was a short-tailed rectangular plan to be located in Lansing, Michigan. Although the structure was never built, it was developed into working drawings and was utilized in the creation of another Frank Lloyd Wright design for the Faculty House at Florida Southern College's campus. The Hause House was a Usonian based on the design of wood board and batten exterior as many of them are, while the Florida Southern College Faculty House was a concrete structure. Many similarities are seen on each floor plan with only minor changes due to the Hause projects site location.
