= Frieda and Henry J. Neils House =

Historic house in Minnesota, United States

- U.S. National Register of Historic Places
- Minneapolis Landmark
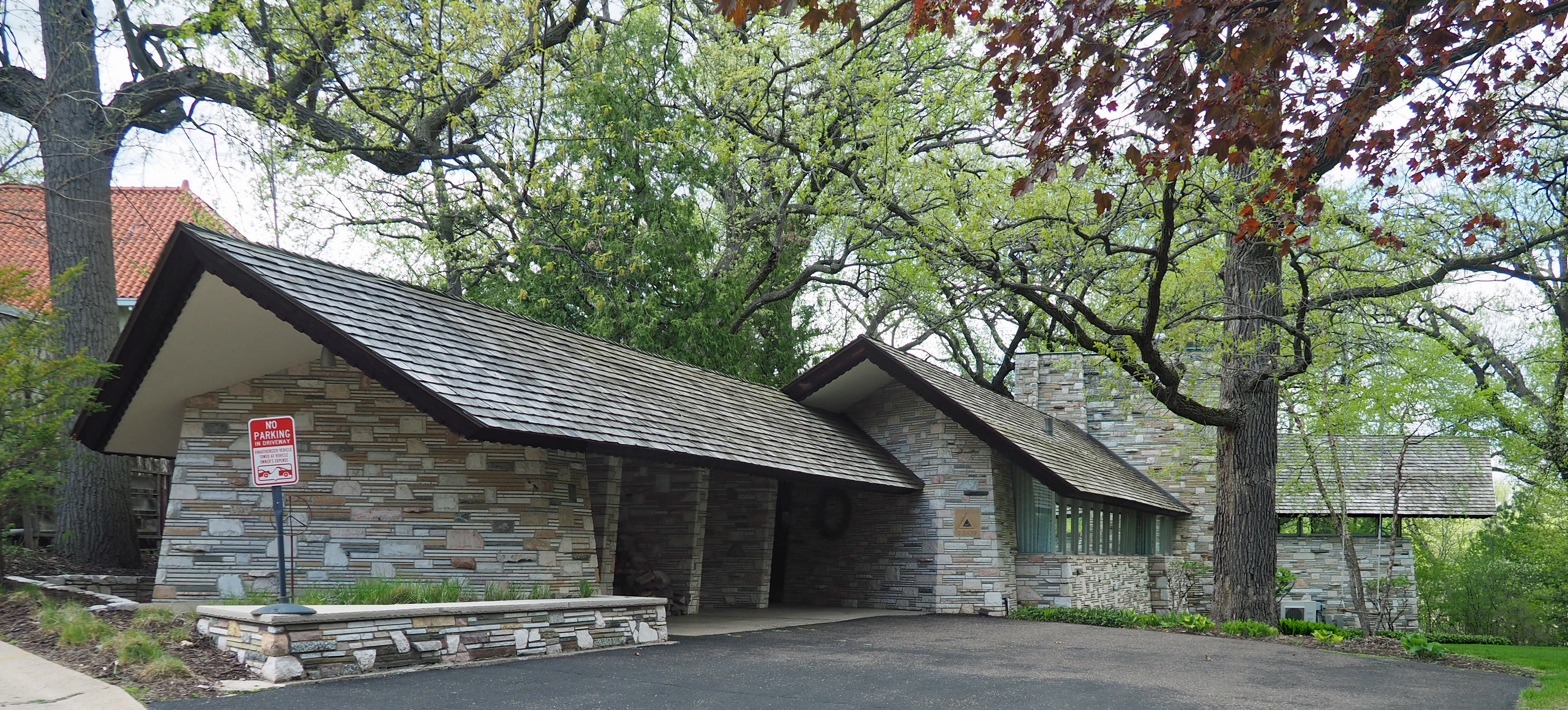
- The Neils House viewed from the south
- Interactive map of Frieda and Henry J. Neils House
- Location: 2801 Burnham Boulevard, Minneapolis, Minnesota
- Built: 1951
- Architect: Frank Lloyd Wright, Lyle Halverson
- Architectural style: Usonian
- NRHP reference No.: 04000531

Significant dates
- Added to NRHP: May 26, 2004
- Designated MPLSL: 1986

The Frieda and Henry J. Neils House is a house in Minneapolis designed by Frank Lloyd Wright. The home was designed for Henry J. Neils, a stone and architectural materials distributor, and his wife Frieda. It is unusual for a Wright-designed home both in the type of stone used as well as in its aluminum window framing.

The Neils approached Wright in 1949 to help build a new home on property adjacent to their existing home, overlooking Cedar Lake. The home was designed through close collaboration between the architect and the Neils who were knowledgeable about architecture. It was Wright's only home to use marble walls: the small marble blocks were left over from other marble projects, and Henry Neil, who was a trustee of a marble company, was able to acquire them at a good price and convince Wright to use the material; however, the color of the completed walls did not satisfy either Wright or the Neils, and some of the blocks were later stained. Unlike Wright's normal use of wooden window frames, the home used aluminum frames made by Neils' company.

The house was designed in Wright's post-World War II Usonian architecture, with the goal of "affordable, beautiful housing for a democratic America." The L-shaped, one-story home's floor plan features a dominant living room and social and spatial separation into "active" and "quiet" areas. The short side of the L consists of the "active" portion, centering on a living room with 17-foot (5.2 m)-high vaulted ceiling and views of Cedar Lake; the "quiet" portion is the long side ending in a three-car carport and has bedrooms as well as a gallery leading to a hidden main entrance.

Located on 2801 Burnham Boulevard, the home is visible from public streets but remains privately owned by members of the Neils family. In 2026, it was placed for sale for $2.5 million.

== Gallery ==
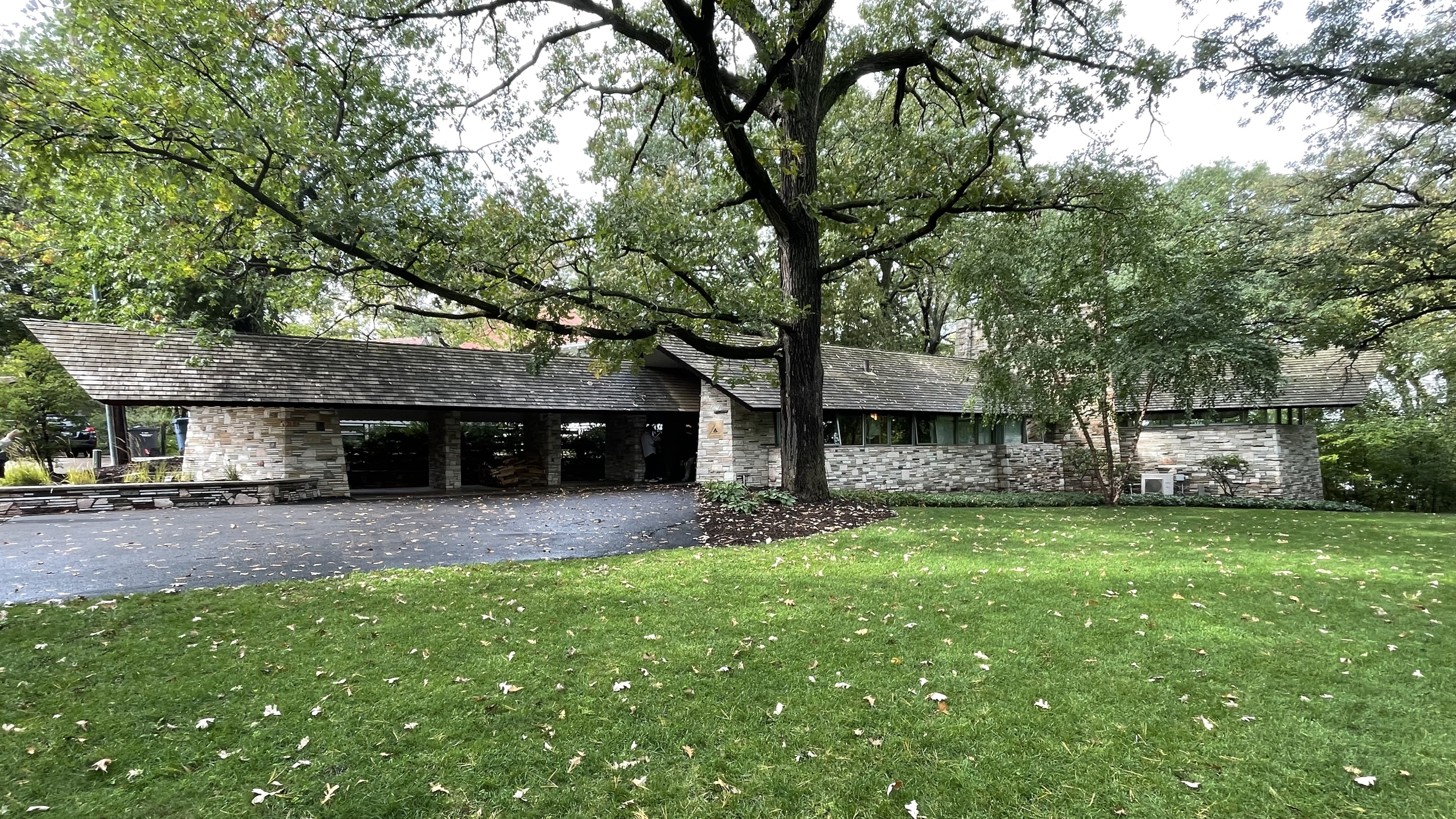
Full length of house from east.

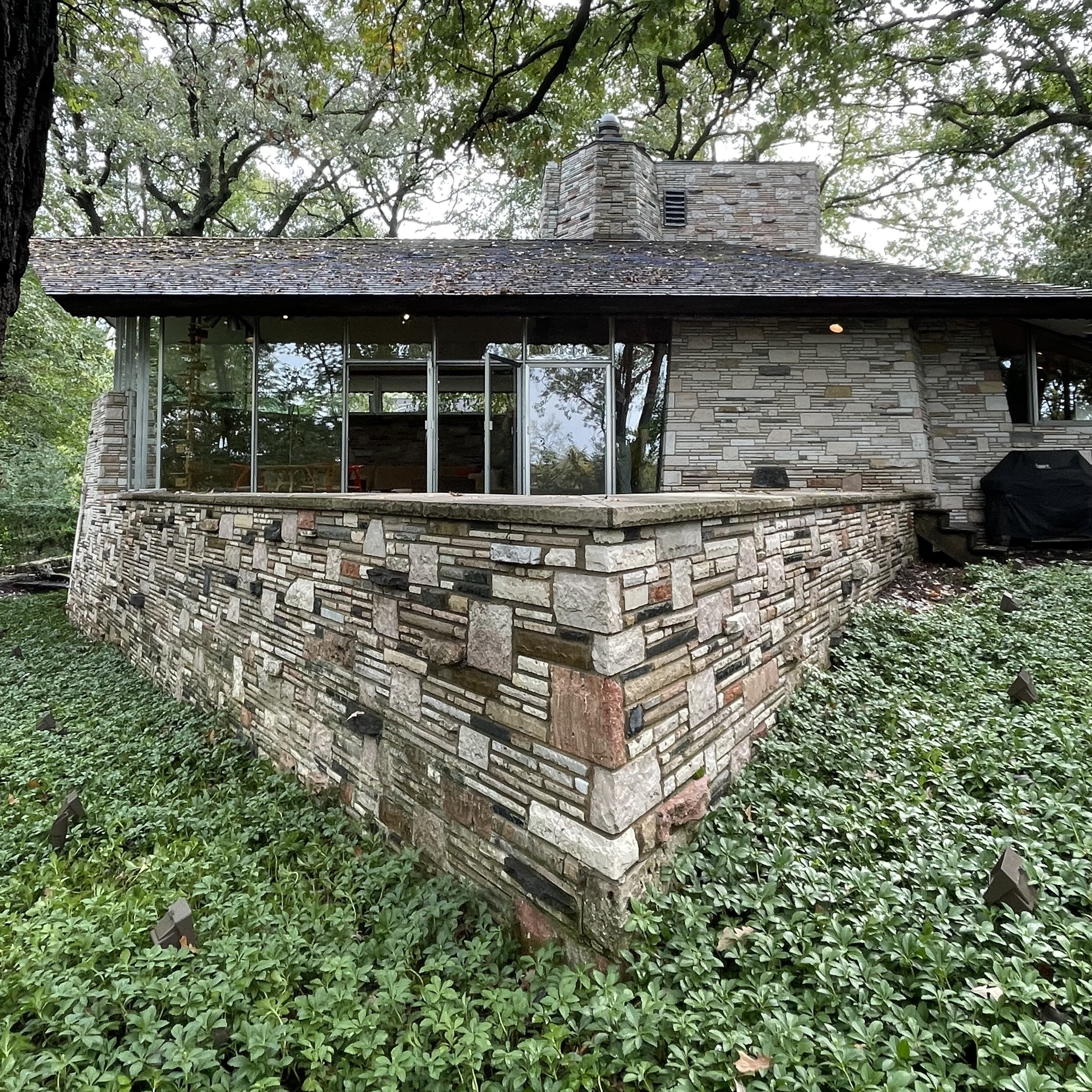
Northwest facing deck. Note use of marble.

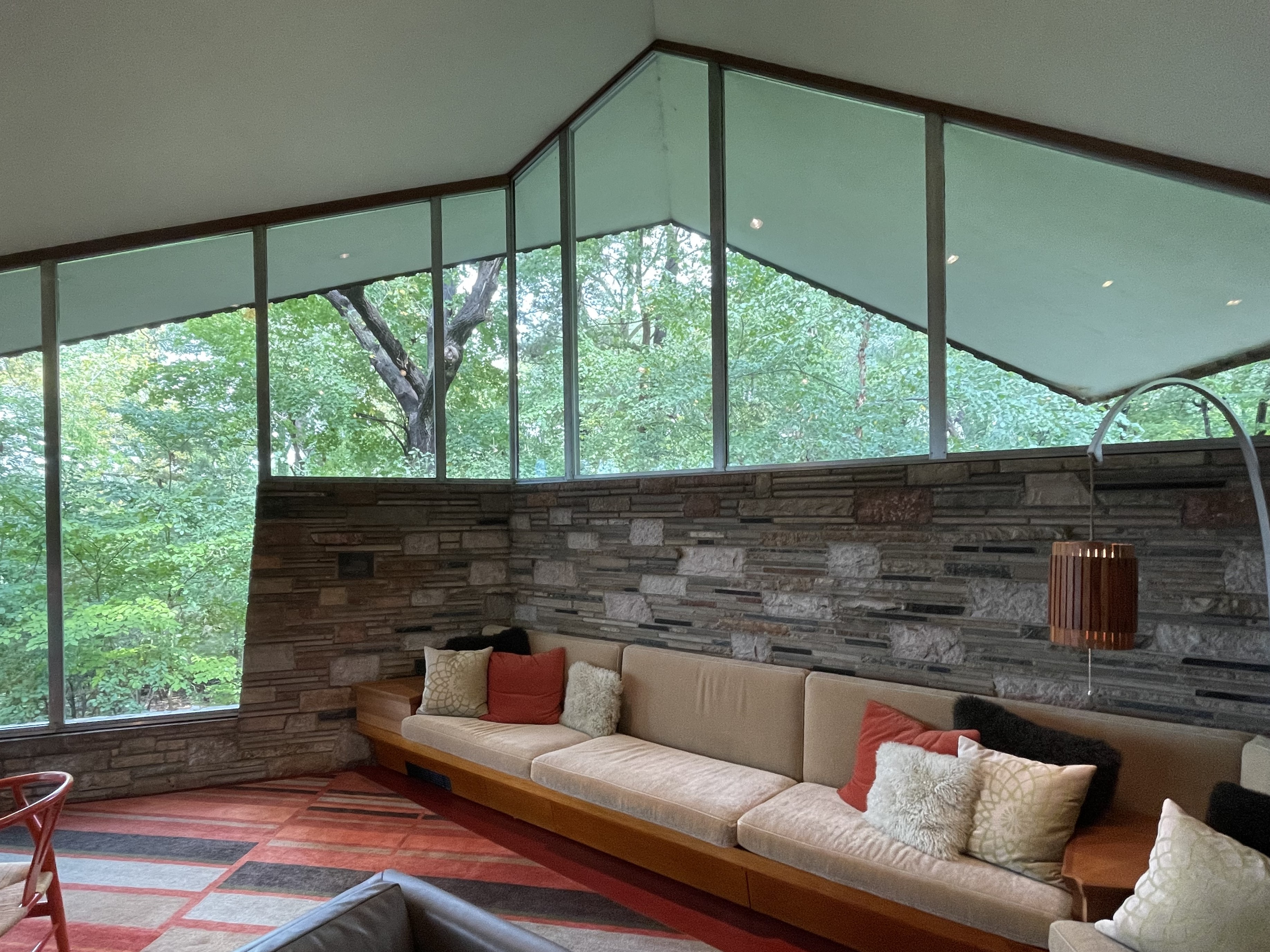
Living room detail with aluminum window frames.

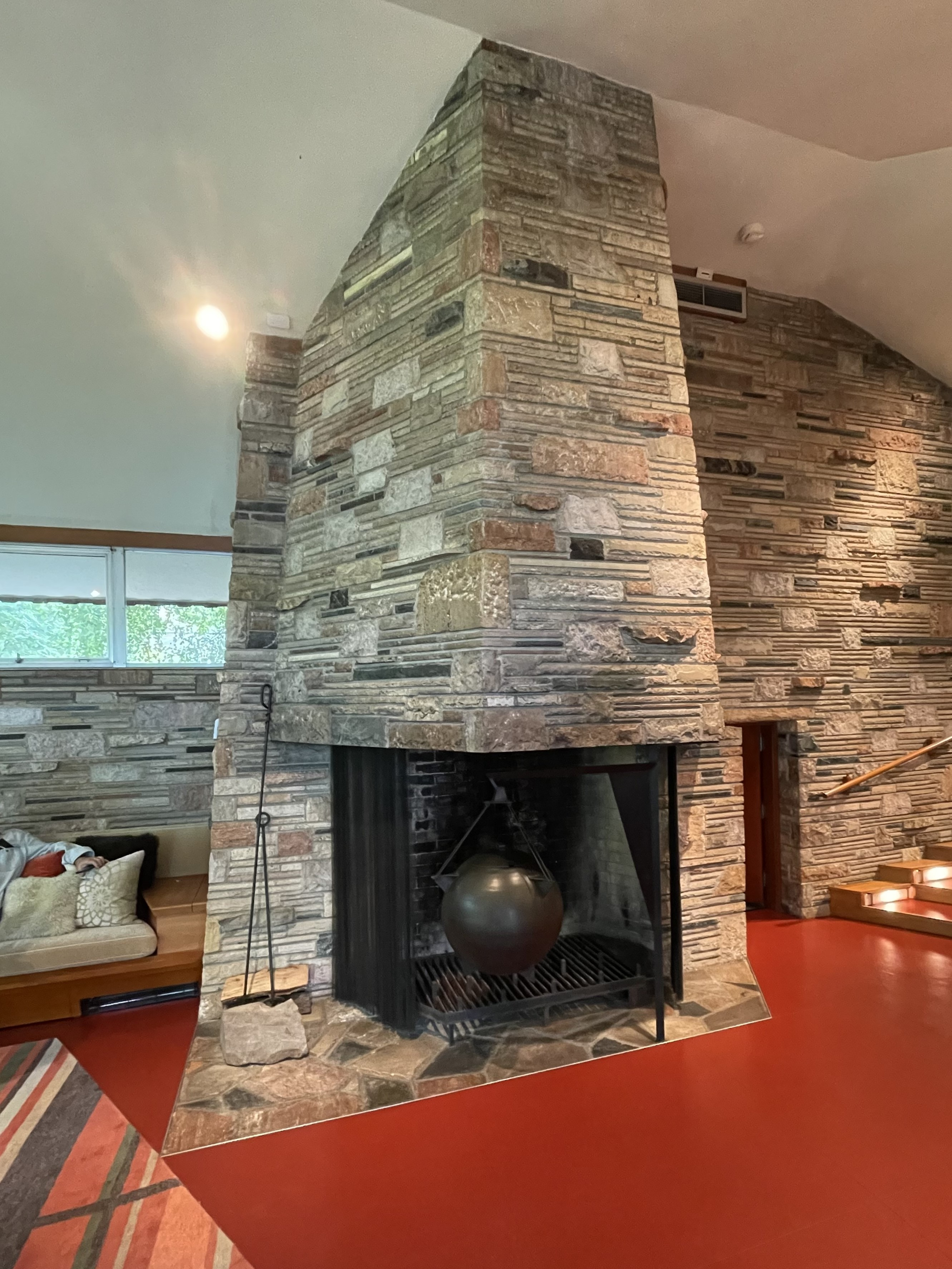
Classic massive Wrightian fireplace.

== See also ==
- List of Frank Lloyd Wright works
