= Bachman–Wilson House =

House in Bentonville, Arkansas

Bachman Wilson House
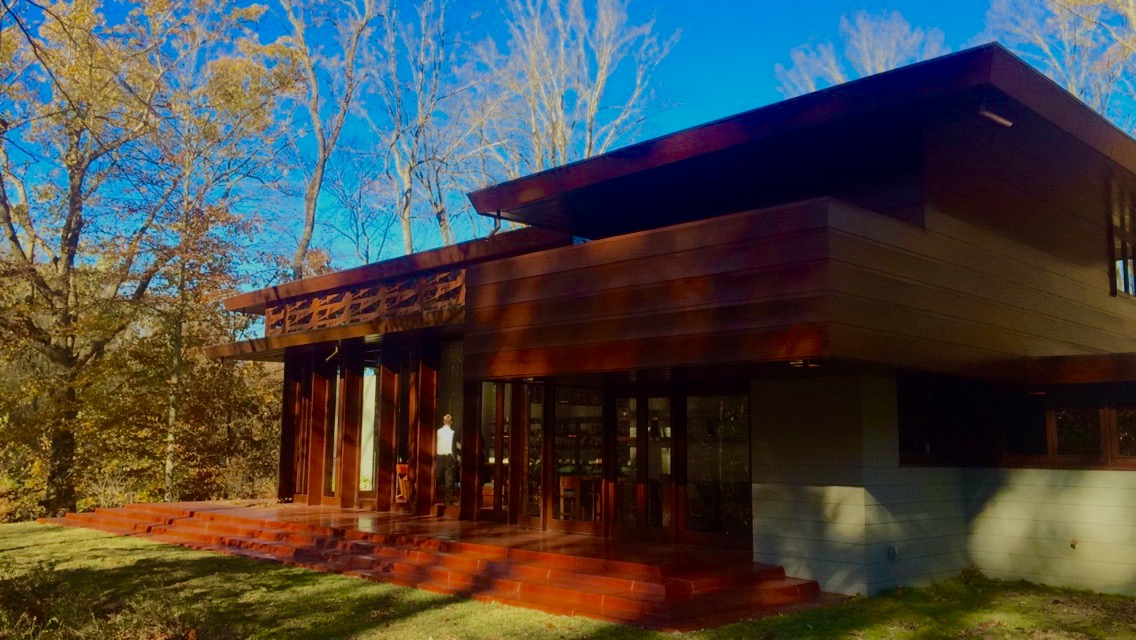

- Location within New Jersey Location within the United States
- Interactive map showing the Bachman-Wilson House

General information
- Type: House
- Architectural style: Usonian
- Location: Millstone, New Jersey
- Coordinates: 40°30′00″N 74°35′15″W
- Construction started: 1954

Technical details
- Floor count: 2
- Floor area: 1,800

Design and construction
- Architect: Frank Lloyd Wright

The Bachman–Wilson House is a Usonian-style house designed by Frank Lloyd Wright, originally located in Millstone, New Jersey, United States. It was built in 1954 for Abraham Wilson and his first wife, Gloria Bachman. Ms. Bachman's brother, Marvin, had studied with Wright at Taliesin West, his home and studio in Scottsdale, Arizona. In 2014 the house was acquired by the Crystal Bridges Museum of American Art in Bentonville, Arkansas and has been relocated in its entirety to the museum's campus.

== Architecture ==
The Bachman-Wilson house is an example of Wright's invention of Usonian architecture. Wright built many of his houses around the notion of comfortable, low-cost living that fits the needs of its residents, as well as building a structure to match its environment. Wright was determined to use his new style to reinvent the previously box-like forms of early-to-mid twentieth century architecture, and create buildings that were right for modern times, as well as engaging and exciting for people to experience in a visual sense. Wright's ideas for low-cost living originated in the early twentieth century, and Wright was able to produce a large number of designs in that time. These would eventually turn into one of the largest collections of designs done by Wright in the early twentieth century.

The house is an example of Wright's ongoing pursuit of the "destruction of the box" with its continuous open and flowing spaces and transparency. Wright's invention of the transparent corner can be seen in the tall windows meeting at a corner looking out onto the back porch area of the house. Another architectural signature of Frank Lloyd Wright is also seen in the fireplace as it sits in the central portion of the house. While it does have many features that give a sense of open space, it also has many other interesting architectural features.

The front façade of concrete blocks has an almost fortress-like appearance to ensure privacy from the street. The house is built with Way-Lite concrete blocks and Philippine mahogany trim. It has a second story, rare in a Usonian house, with cantilevered balconies. The living room has a built-in banquette facing a wooded scene through a wall of 10-foot-high (3.0 m) glass panes, symbolizing a transcendental pew set before the altar of nature.

The public space is a dramatic focal point, with walls of glass and an open floor plan. Cut-out wooden panels of abstracted forms over 24 clerestory windows provide an unobtrusive yet restrained decorative touch to this lavish space. These recall Native American geometric motifs as well as stylized forms that may be based in nature. Construction was completed in 1956. Gloria and Abraham Wilson were the original owners of the home, and it was later bought and restored in 1988.

== Sharon and Lawrence Tarantino ==
In 1988, Sharon and Lawrence Tarantino acquired the neglected Bachman Wilson House. Tarantino Architects has since guided the home's complete restoration and rebuilt the kitchen according to Wright's original drawings. Sharon and Lawrence Tarantino have received several awards for their restoration work, including the Wright Spirit Award from the Frank Lloyd Wright Building Conservancy.

The house was originally located along the Millstone River in Millstone Borough. It exemplifies Wright's "Usonian" philosophy and employs his early green building principles, including minimizing the size of the house and ancillary spaces, pioneering passive solar and radiant heat design, employing natural daylight and recycling construction waste. As its location was prone to flooding, the owners sought to relocate and rebuild it at a safer site in order to preserve it.

== Relocation and renovation ==
On January 15, 2014, the Crystal Bridges Museum of American Art in Bentonville, Arkansas, announced that it was acquiring the Bachman–Wilson House and had made plans to relocate the house in its entirety to the museum's campus. Due to its past flooding and other circumstances, not all of the original structure could be relocated, such as the exterior concrete block wall and the stained concrete flooring, both of which have been remade by Crystal Bridges' reconstruction crew for the relocation. Despite flood damage, most of the interior of the house has been saved and can be seen and toured on the grounds of Crystal Bridges.

The house is located on the south side of Crystal Bridges (36.380452°N 94.204070°W) and is only a brief walk from the south entrance. In addition, there is also a welcoming pavilion constructed by the Fay Jones School of Architecture from The University of Arkansas that educates visitors about the Bachman–Wilson House and about Frank Lloyd Wright and his works elsewhere.

== See also ==
- List of Frank Lloyd Wright works

== Bibliography ==
- Storrer, William Allin (1993). The Frank Lloyd Wright Companion. Chicago: University of Chicago Press. ISBN 978-0-226-77624-8. (S.366)
- Kennedy-Grant, Philip S. "AIA New Jersey Guidebook". Rutgers University Press, 2012, ISBN 978-0-8135-5126-5
