= J.A. Sweeton Residence =

- Location within Camden County, New Jersey

General information
- Type: House
- Architectural style: Usonian
- Location: 373 Kings Highway North; Cherry Hill, New Jersey 08034
- Coordinates: 39.928128°N 74.992971°W
- Construction started: 1950

Technical details
- Floor area: 1,500 sq ft (140 m^{2})

Design and construction
- Architect: Frank Lloyd Wright

The J.A. Sweeton Residence was built in 1950 in Cherry Hill, in Camden County, New Jersey, United States. At 1,500 square feet (140 m^{2}), it is the smallest of the four Frank Lloyd Wright houses in New Jersey. This Usonian scheme house was constructed of concrete blocks and redwood plywood.

The Sweeton House is sheltered by a dramatically pitched roof that comes within four feet of the ground. An impressive cantilevered carport extending about 20 feet (6.1 m) from the house provides a dramatic visual element to the entrance. Wright loved the automobile but thought garages were a relic of the "livery-stable mind," according to his revised autobiography.

The compact horizontal plan reflects a standard Usonian scheme. Three bedrooms and one bathroom are arranged on a linear axis like cabins of an ocean liner. With its prominent living room defined by six glass doors, mitered glass corners and cathedral ceiling, the home seems larger than its 1,500 square feet (140 m^{2}).

The Sweeton House remains a private residence and is not accessible by the public. The larger original site has been subdivided and is isolated from major roadways.

The homes address is actually 373 Kings Highway. 375 is Princeton Behavioral Center, house is behind the Center.

== See also ==
- List of Frank Lloyd Wright works
