= Dudley Spencer House =

Historic house in Delaware, United States

- Laurel
- U.S. National Register of Historic Places
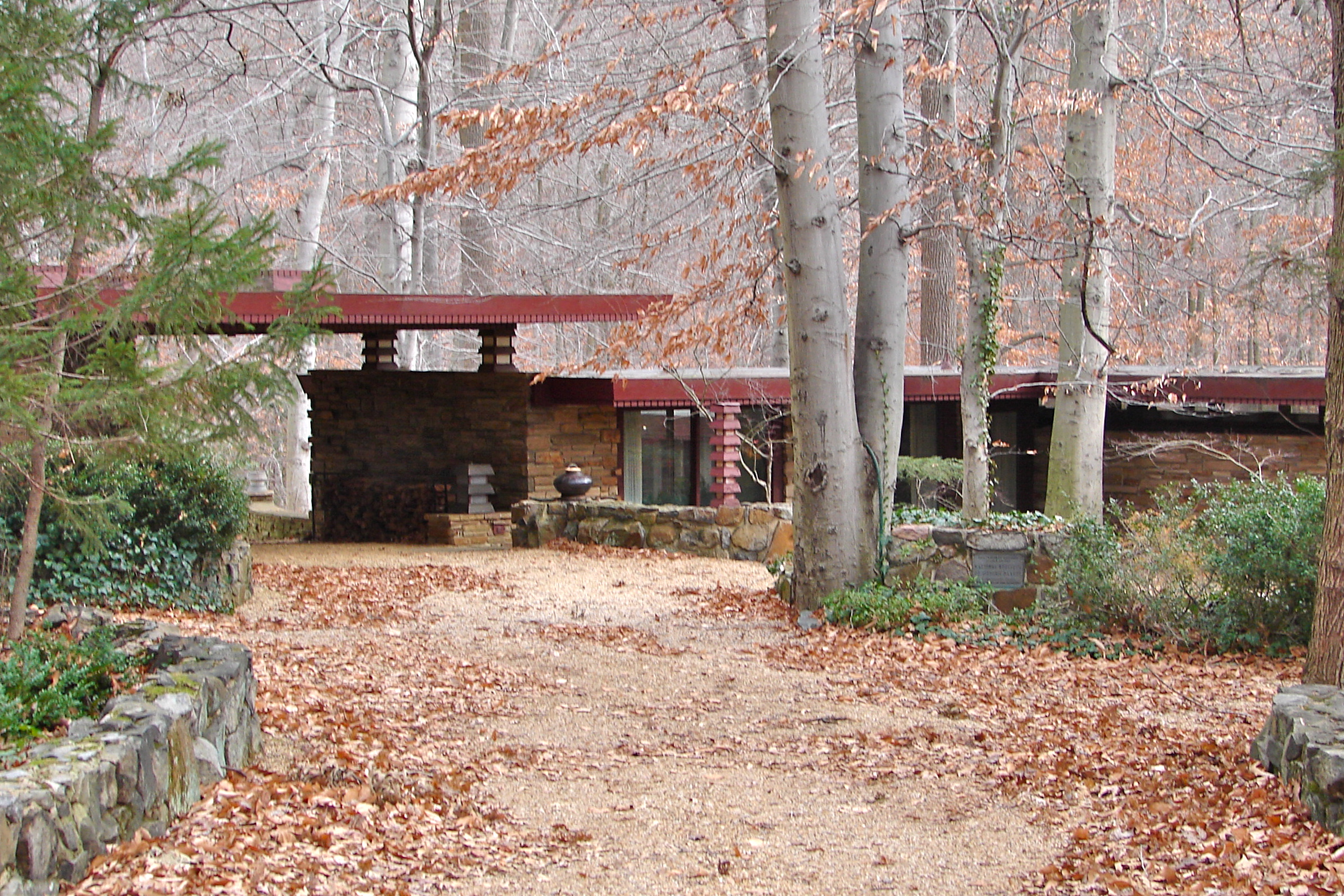

- Location within Delaware Location within the United States
- Location: 619 Shipley Rd, Wilmington, Delaware
- Coordinates: 39.77355°N 75.51678°W
- Area: 6.7 acres (2.7 ha)
- Built: 1956-1961
- Architect: Frank Lloyd Wright
- Architectural style: Usonian
- NRHP reference No.: 74000603
- Added to NRHP: December 4, 1974

The Dudley Spencer House, also called Laurel, is a Frank Lloyd Wright–designed Usonian home in Wilmington, Delaware.

Wright designed this home in 1956 and named it "Laurel". This house is of the hemicycle design, and is built of irregularly coursed fieldstone. This single story house has a flat roof with curvilinear extensions and windows under roof extensions. The interior fireplace and hearth serves as dominant structural and aesthetic element. Typical of Wright designs, the home successfully blends with the surrounding wooded environment. The Dudley Spencer house is private and not accessible to the public. The house was built by its first owner, Dudley Spencer, over a five-year period between 1956 and 1961. In a 1969 interview, Spencer said he personally designed and built the steel structures used in the house and enlisted the help of a local prison gang.

Following the death of Spencer in 2012, the house was sold to its current owners in 2013.

The house was listed on the National Register of Historic Places in 1974.

== See also ==
- List of Frank Lloyd Wright works
- National Register of Historic Places listings in Wilmington, Delaware
