= Usonia =

Architectural style and ideal promoted by Frank Lloyd Wright

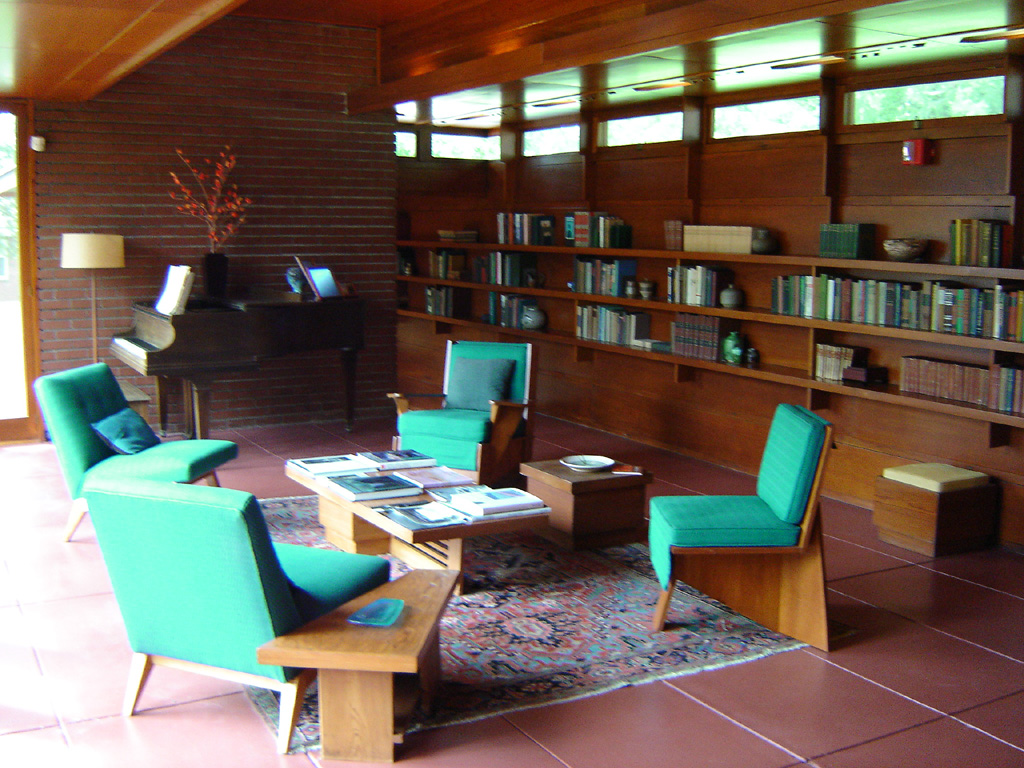
The interior of the Rosenbaum House

Usonia (/juːˈsoʊni.ə/) is a mid-20th-century architectural style and ideal for the United States promoted by American architect Frank Lloyd Wright. The architectural style predominantly refers to a class of small, single-story dwellings designed by Wright without a garage or much storage. They are often L- or T-shaped, characterized by native materials; flat roofs and large cantilevered overhangs for passive solar heating and natural cooling; natural lighting with clerestory windows; and radiant-floor heating.

Wright used the term 'Usonia' to refer to the United States in general (in preference over America), and more specifically to his vision for the landscape of the country, including the planning of cities and the architecture of buildings. Wright proposed the use of the adjective Usonian, coined by a Scottish writer in the early 20th century.

Wright regarded the term "United States" as primarily referring to a political union, and he sought to define an 'American way of life' beyond the Constitutional structure that extended beyond constitutional and governmental forms.

In his 1957 book ''A Testament'', Wright associated Usonia with middle-class democratic societies opposed to European aristocracy.

== Etymology ==
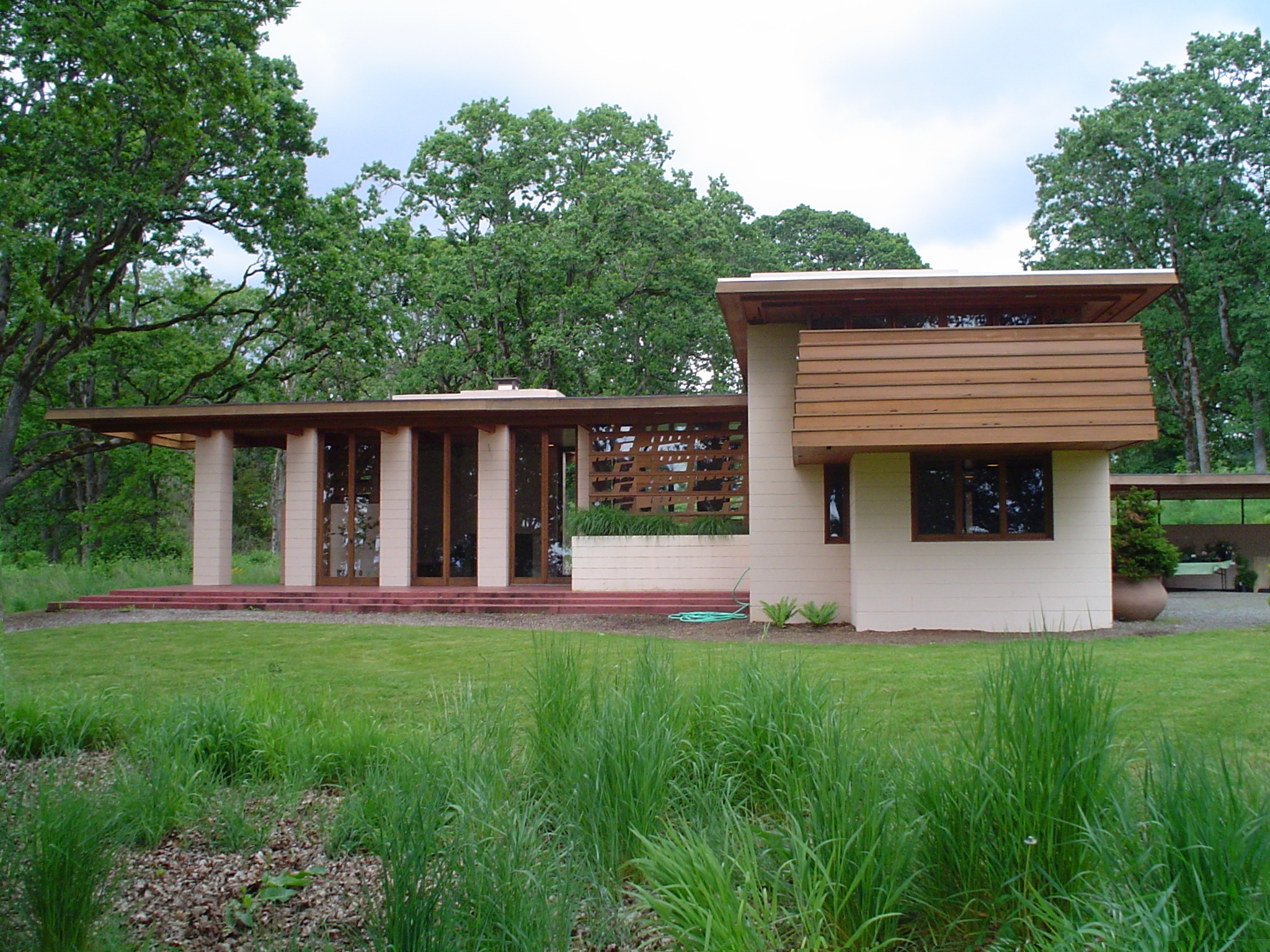
Gordon House

The word Usonian appears to have been coined by James Duff Law, a Scottish writer born in 1865. In a miscellaneous collection, Here and There in Two Hemispheres (1903), Law quoted a letter of his own (dated June 18, 1903) that begins "We of the United States, in justice to Canadians and Mexicans, have no right to use the title 'Americans' when referring to matters pertaining exclusively to ourselves." He went on to acknowledge that some author had proposed "Usona" (United States of North America), but that he preferred the form "Usonia" (United States of North Independent America). The earliest published use by Wright was in 1927:

But why this term "America" has become representative as the name of these United States at home and abroad is past recall. Samuel Butler fitted us with a good name. He called us Usonians, and our Nation of combined States, Usonia.

— Frank Lloyd Wright

== Usonian house design ==
The Usonian style is shared by middle-income family homes designed by Frank Lloyd Wright. Wright had mostly designed houses for wealthy clients until the 1930s, when he also began to design lower-cost Usonian houses for middle-class families. The Willey House, built in 1934, may have been the first Usonian house; the Herbert and Katherine Jacobs First House, built in 1937, is often considered to be the first true "Usonian". Over his lifetime, he designed more than 300 Usonian houses, including 140 that were ultimately constructed.

In general, his Usonian houses tended to have open plans, geometric floor grids, in-floor heating, and a carport, and they lacked a garage or basement. They also tended to be arranged in the shape of an "L" or a "T". They are characterized by native materials; flat roofs and large cantilevered overhangs for passive solar heating and natural cooling; natural lighting with clerestory windows; and radiant-floor heating. Another distinctive feature is that they typically have little exposure to the front/'public' side, while the rear/'private' sides open expansively to their view. This strong visual connection between the interior and exterior spaces is an important characteristic of all Usonian homes.

After designing the Jacobs First House, Wright ultimately designed dozens of similar Usonian homes across the U.S. The Usonian design is considered among the aesthetic origins of the ranch-style house popular in the American west of the 1950s. The Usonia Historic District is a planned community in Pleasantville, New York, built in the 1950s following this concept. Wright designed three of the 47 homes himself.

== Noted Usonian houses ==
=== Precursor to Usonians ===
- Malcolm Willey House 1934, Minneapolis, Minnesota
- Peters-Margedant House* 1934, University of Evansville, Evansville, Indiana. (Note: The Peters-Margedant house was not designed by Wright, but rather, one of his apprentices, William Wesley "Wes" Peters. Many of its features were later incorporated into the Usonians.)

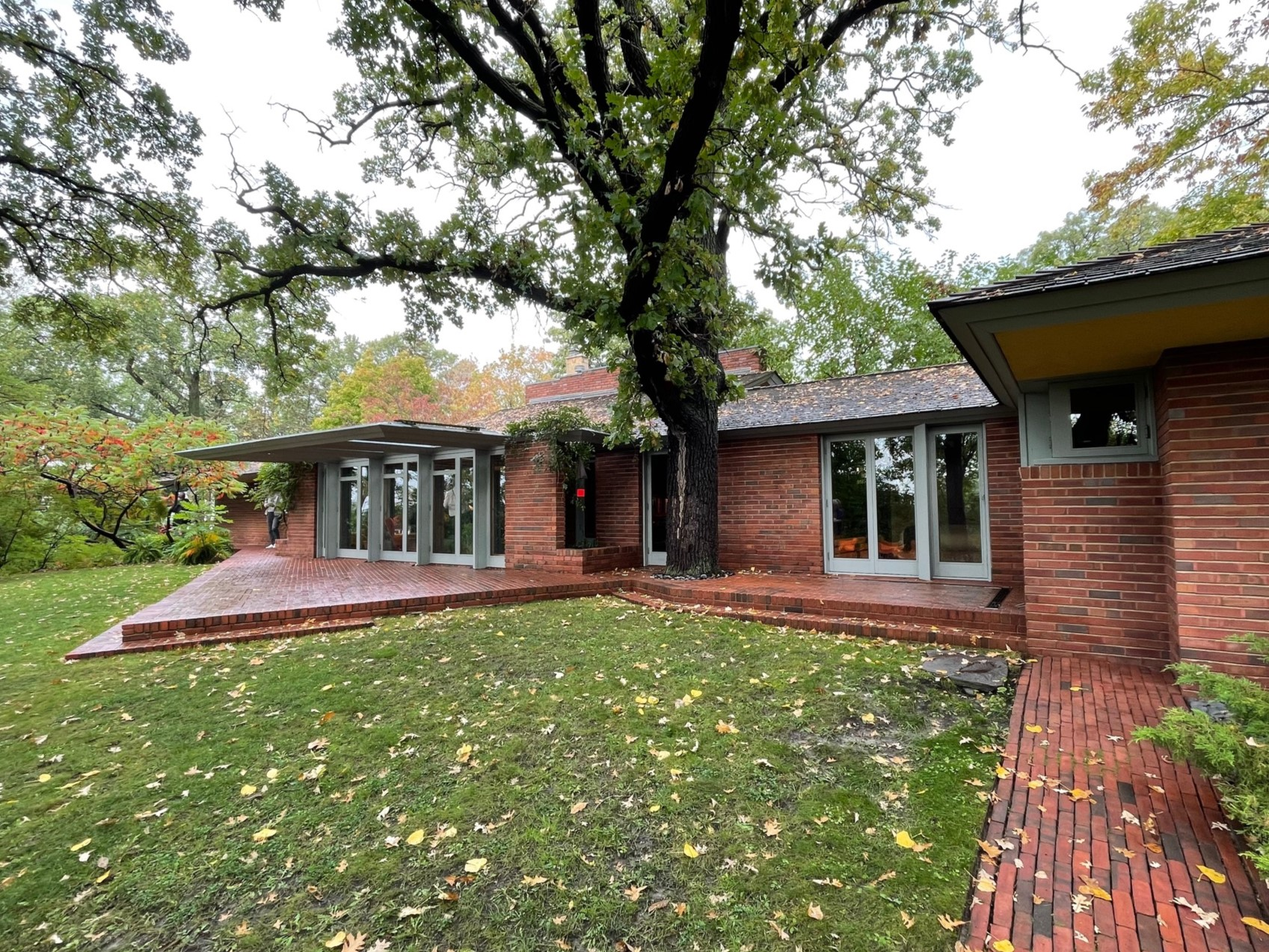
The Malcolm Willey House, a precursor to the Usonians

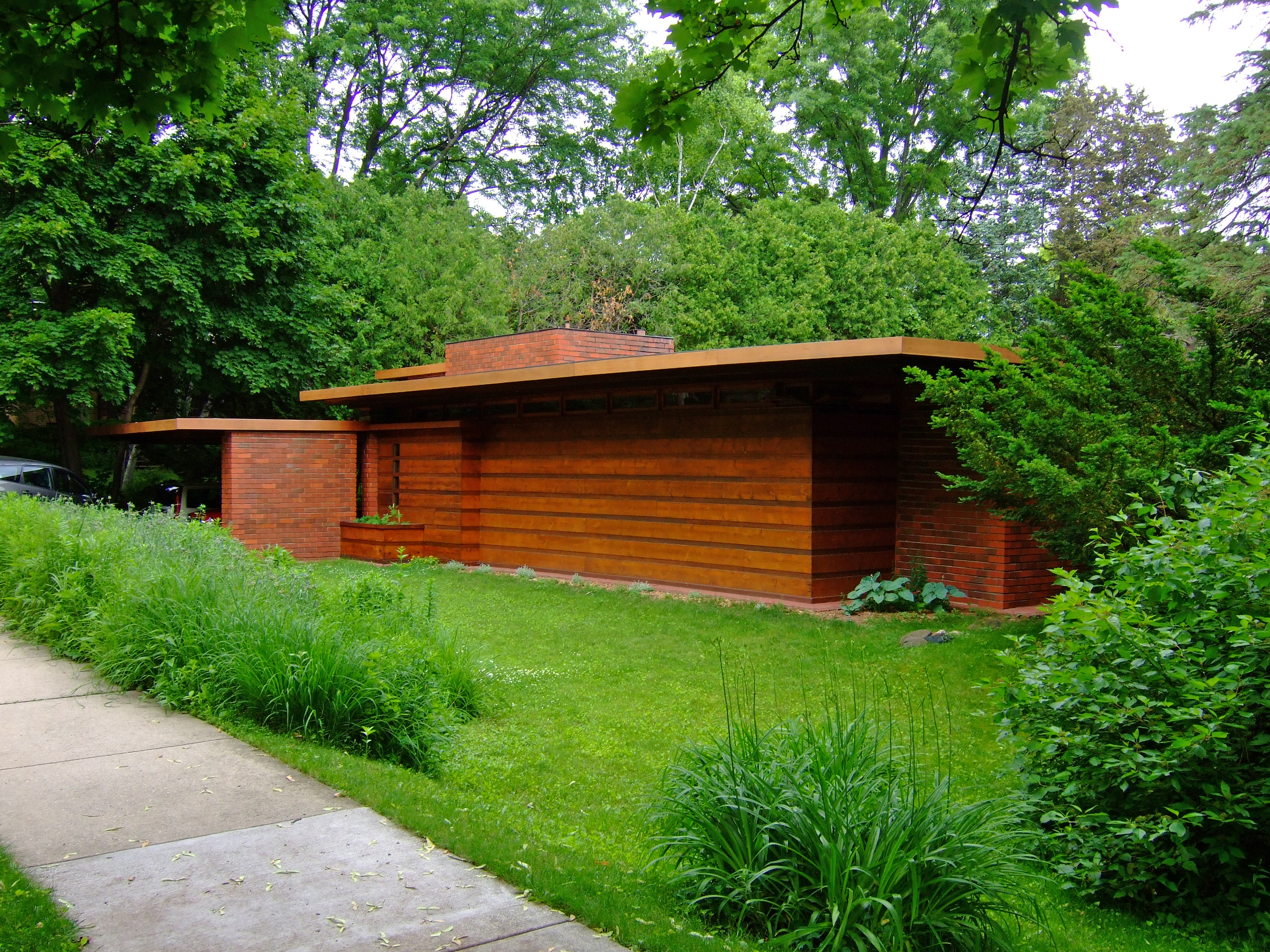
Jacobs I, exterior, front. Widely considered to be the first true Usonian house.

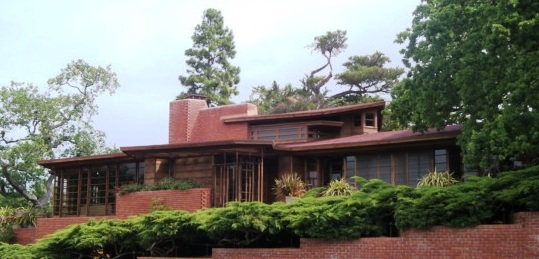
Hanna–Honeycomb House, view of front exterior

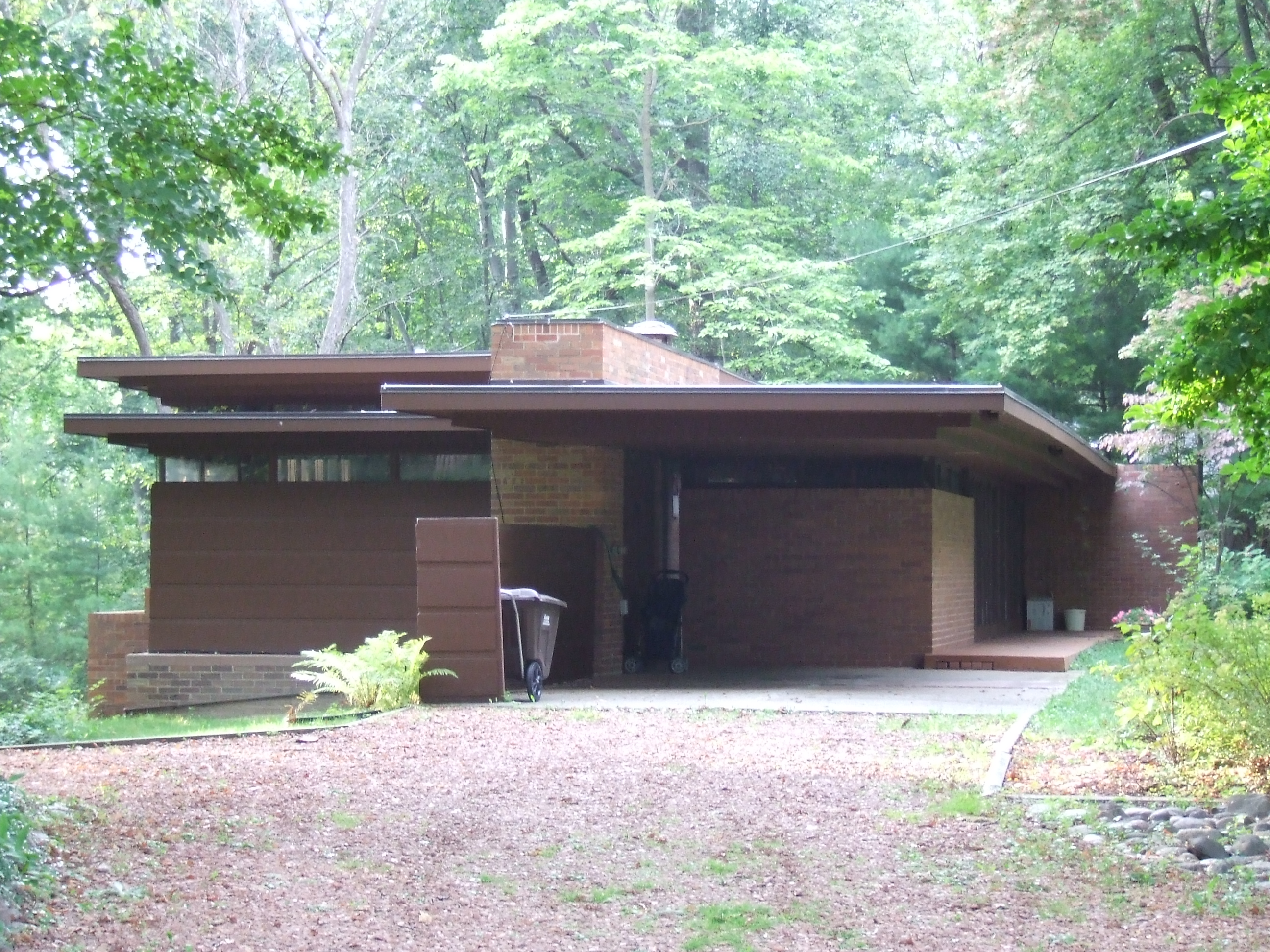
Goetsch–Winckler House, exterior, view of carport and entry

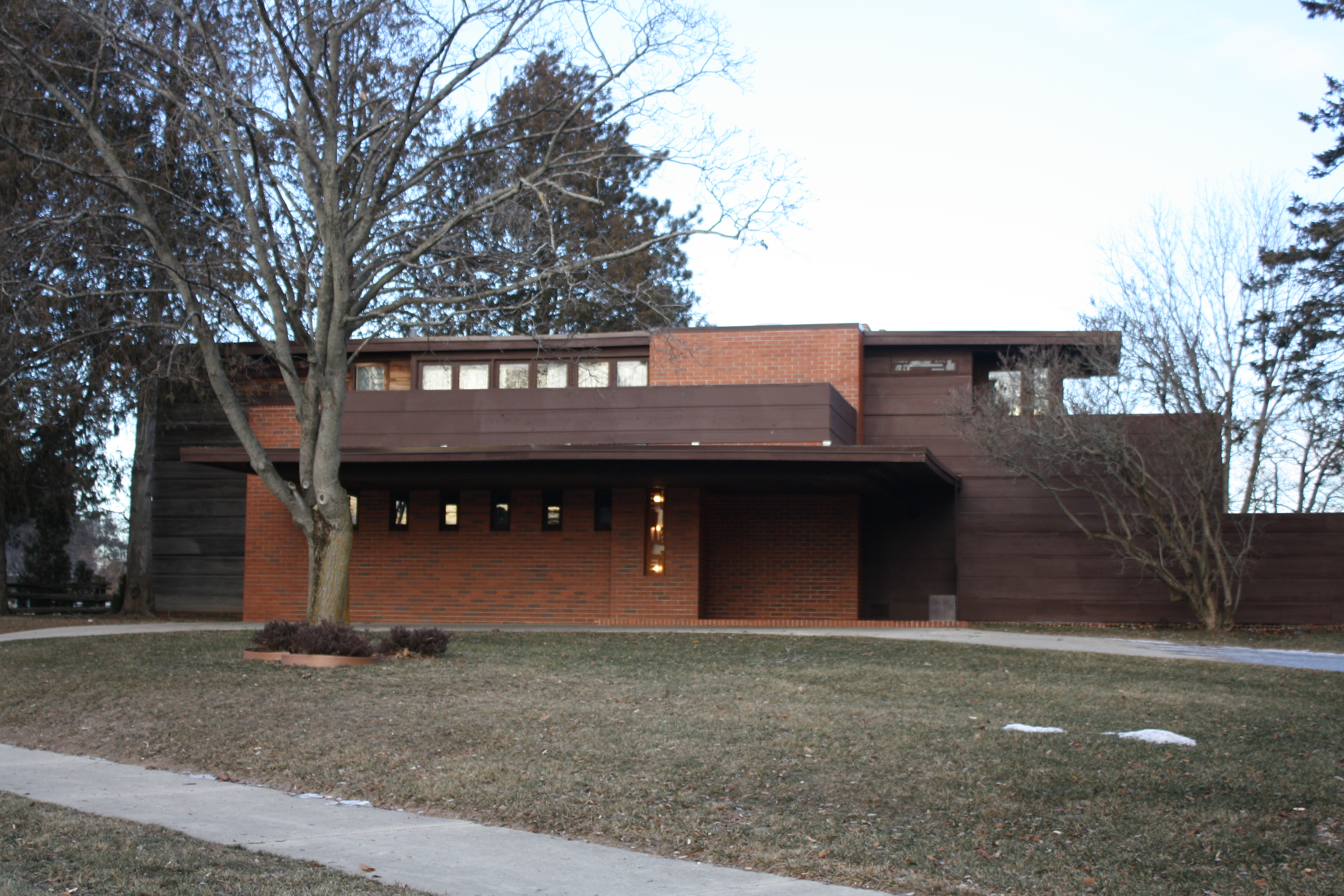
Bernard Schwartz House, one of only a few 2-story Usonians designed and built

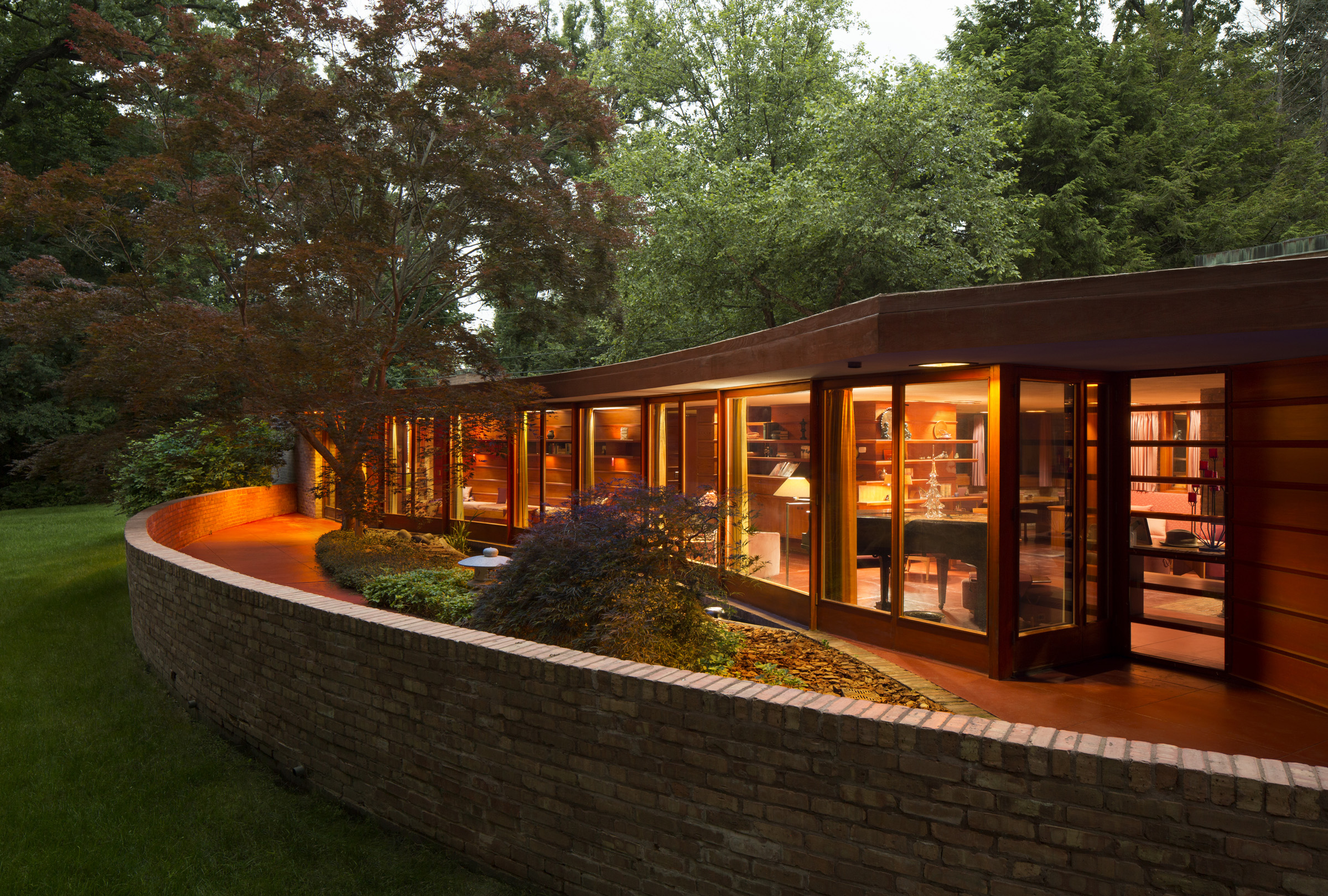
View of the rear/private side of the Laurent House. This house is a "hemicycle" Usonian, rather than the more typical L-shaped variants. It is also the only house Wright designed for a physically disabled client.

=== Usonian Houses ===
- Herbert and Katherine Jacobs First House, "Jacobs I", 1937, Madison, Wisconsin
- Paul and Jean Hanna House, "Honeycomb House", 1937, Palo Alto, California
- Benjamin Rebhuhn House 1937, Great Neck Estates, New York
- Andrew F.H. Armstrong House 1939, Ogden Dunes, Indiana
- Joseph Euchtman House 1939, Baltimore, Maryland
- Bernard Schwartz House 1939, Two Rivers, Wisconsin
- George Sturges House 1939, Los Angeles, California
- John and Ruth Pew House 1939, Shorewood Hills, Wisconsin
- Hause House 1939, Lansing, Michigan
- Sidney Bazett House (also known as the Bazett-Frank House) 1940 Hillsborough, California
- Goetsch–Winckler House 1940, Okemos, Michigan
- Gregor S. and Elizabeth B. Affleck House 1940 Bloomfield Hills, Michigan
- Rosenbaum House 1940, Florence, Alabama
- Theodore Baird Residence 1940, Amherst, Massachusetts
- Clarence Sondern House 1940, Kansas City, Missouri
- Pope–Leighey House 1941, Alexandria, Virginia
- Stuart Richardson House 1941 (built 1951) Glen Ridge, New Jersey
- Alvin Miller House (also known as the Alvin and Inez Miller residence) 1946, Charles City, Iowa
- Erling P. Brauner House 1948, Okemos, Michigan
- The Acres, Galesburg, Michigan

- Samuel & Dorothy Eppstein House 1949
- Eric & Pat Pratt House 1949
- Curtis & Lillian Meyer House 1949
- David & Christine Weisblat House 1949

- Parkwyn Village, Kalamazoo, Michigan

- Ward McCartney House 1949
- Robert & Rae Levin House 1948
- Robert D Winn House 1949
- Eric V. Brown House 1949

- Usonia Homes, Pleasantville, New York

- Sol Friedman House 1949
- Edward Serlin House 1951
- Roland Reisley House 1951

- Kenneth and Phyllis Laurent House 1949, Rockford, Illinois
- Melvyn Maxwell and Sara Stein Smith House 1950, Bloomfield Township, Michigan
- Weltzheimer/Johnson House 1949, Oberlin, Ohio
- Donald Schaberg House 1950, Okemos, Michigan
- Karl A. Staley House 1950, North Madison, Ohio
- J.A. Sweeton Residence 1950, Cherry Hill, New Jersey
- Seamour and Gerte Shavin House 1950, Chattanooga, Tennessee
- Lowell and Agnes Walter House 1950, Quasqueton, Iowa
- Kraus House 1950, Kirkwood, Missouri
- Nathan Rubin House 1951, Canton, Ohio
- Muirhead Farmhouse 1951, Hampshire, Illinois
- Zimmerman House 1951, Manchester, New Hampshire
- John D. Haynes House 1952, Fort Wayne, Indiana
- Frank S. Sander House 1952, Stamford, Connecticut
- R. W. Lindholm Residence, "Mäntylä", 1952, Donegal, Pennsylvania (dismantled and relocated from its original location in Cloquet, Minnesota)
- Kentuck Knob 1953, Stewart Township, Pennsylvania
- John and Syd Dobkins House 1953, Canton, Ohio
- Bachman–Wilson House 1954, Millstone, New Jersey
- Ellis Feiman House 1954, Canton, Ohio
- John E. Christian House "Samara" 1954, West Lafayette, Indiana
- J. Willis Hughes house "Fountainhead", 1954, Jackson, Mississippi
- William L. Thaxton Jr. House 1955, Houston, Texas
- Louis Penfield House 1955, Willoughby Hills, Ohio
- Cedric G. and Patricia Neils Boulter House 1956, Cincinnati, Ohio
- Dudley Spencer House 1956, Wilmington, Delaware
- Dr. Richard and Mrs. Margaret Martin House 1956, Nashville, TN
- Donald C. Duncan House 1957, Donegal, Pennsylvania (dismantled and relocated from its original location in Lisle, Illinois)
- Evelyn and Conrad Gordon House 1957, Wilsonville, Oregon (later moved to Silverton, Oregon)
- Lovness House and Cottage 1957, Stillwater, Minnesota
- Robert H. Sunday House 1957, Marshalltown, Iowa
- John Gillin Residence 1958, Dallas, Texas
- Paul J. and Ida Trier House 1958, Johnston, Iowa

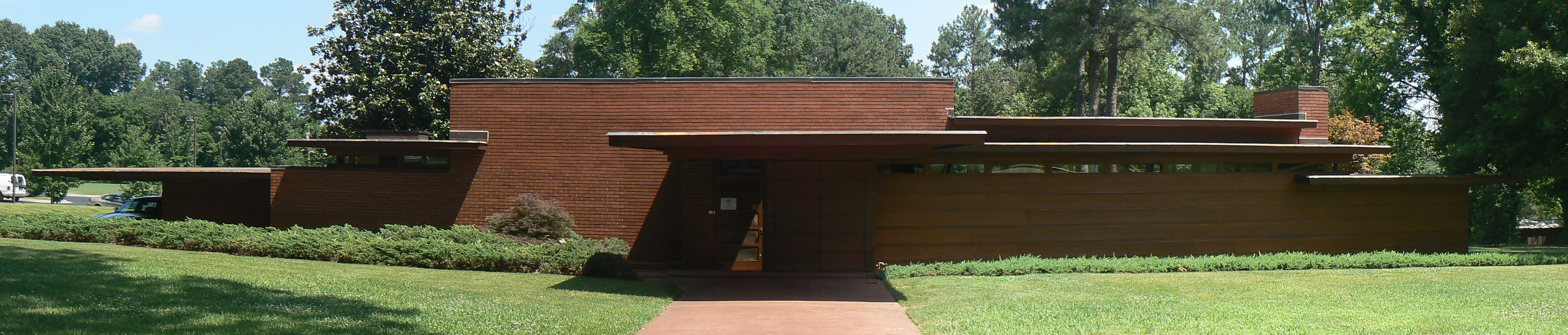
Street-side view of the Rosenbaum House. The two, long, cantilevered, roofs pictured are a signature feature of Usonian houses, and serve to emphasize the horizontal.

=== The FSC Usonian House ===
The Florida Southern College campus features a collection of thirteen Frank Lloyd Wright buildings, known as Child of the Sun. The most recent, referred to as the "Usonian House", was constructed in 2013 according to a 1939 Wright design for one of twenty faculty housing units. The 1,700 sq ft (160 m^{2}) building includes textile-block construction and colored glass in perforated concrete blocks, and features furniture also designed by Wright. It is home to the Sharp Family Tourism and Education Center, a visitor center for guests visiting campus to see the Wright buildings, and includes Wright photographs and a documentary film about the architect's work at the school.

=== Usonian Automatic Houses ===
The Usonian Automatic system used concrete blocks and was intended to lower construction costs by enabling homeowners to cast the blocks themselves and participate in building their homes.

- Benjamin Adelman Residence 1951, Phoenix, Arizona
- Arthur Pieper Residence 1952, Paradise Valley, Arizona
- Gerald B. and Beverley Tonkens House 1954, Amberley Village, Hamilton County, Ohio
- Toufic H. Kalil House 1955, Manchester, New Hampshire
- Theodore A. Pappas House 1955, Town and Country, Missouri
- Tracy House 1956, Normandy Park, Washington
- Dorothy H. Turkel House 1956, Detroit, Michigan
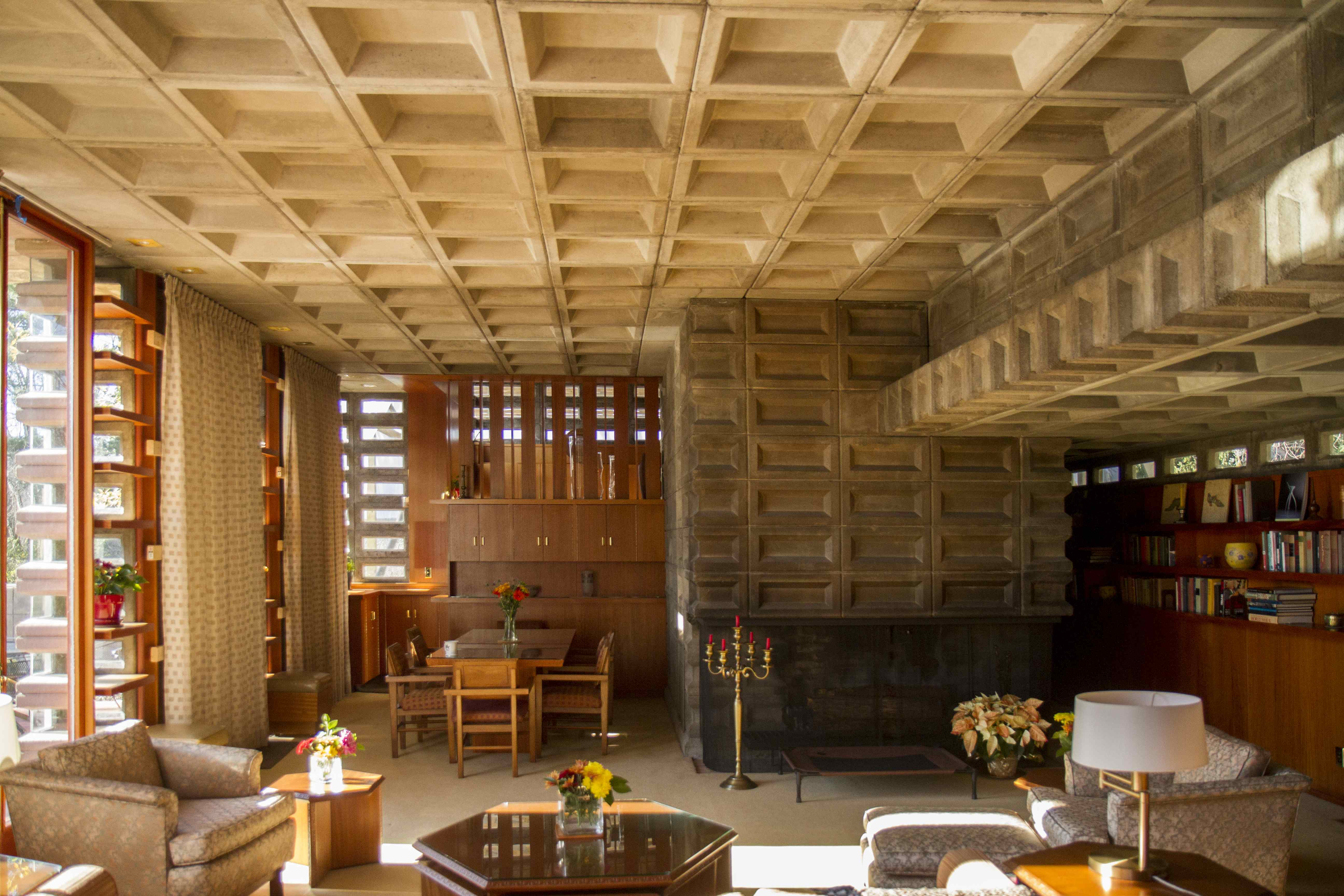
View of the coffer ceilinged Great Room in the Tonkens House

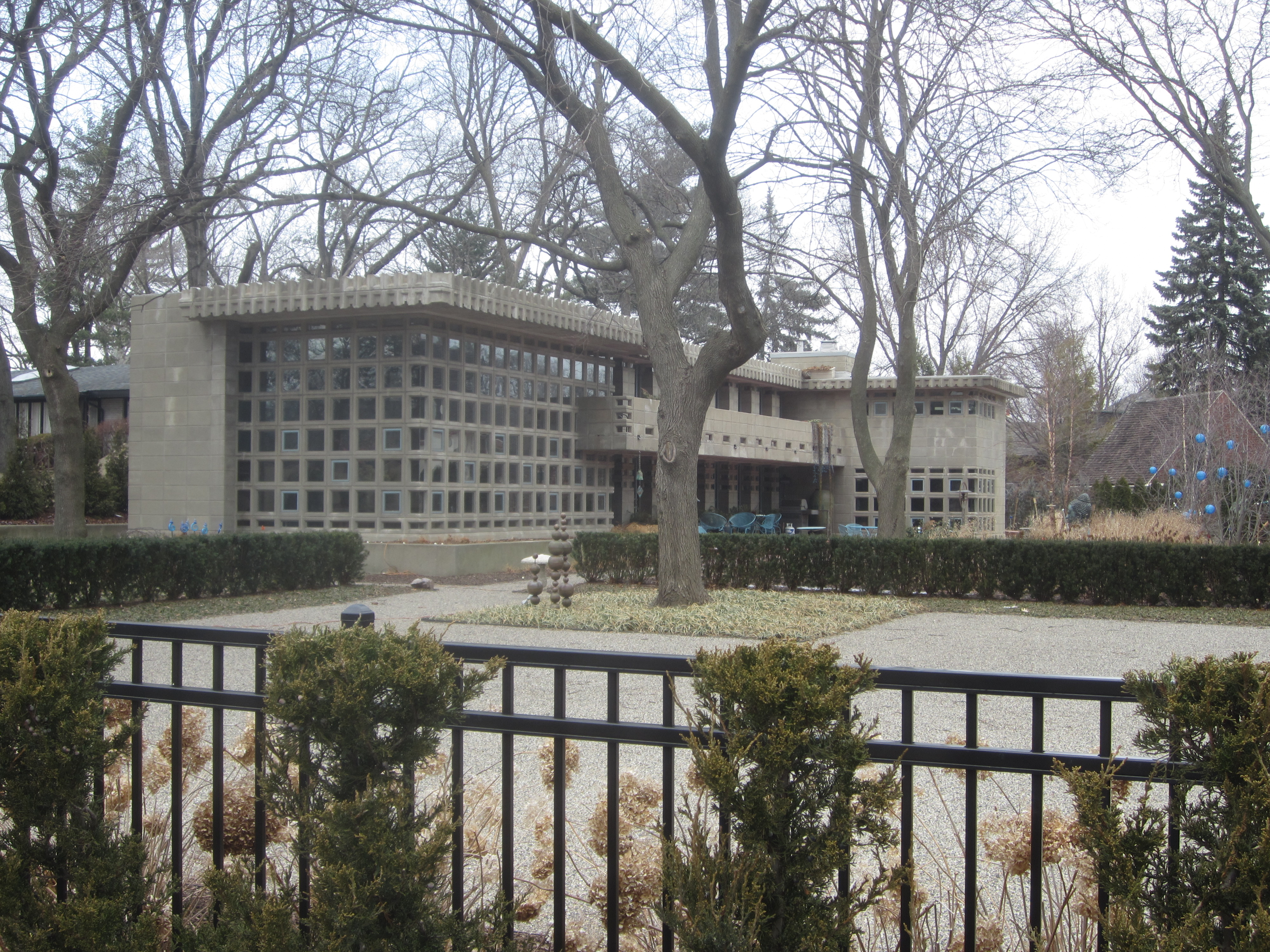
Exterior of the Dorothy H. Turkel House

== See also ==
- Usonia Historic District
- List of Frank Lloyd Wright works
- Polychrome Historic District, a similar effort to provide inexpensive housing, by John Joseph Earley
