= Frank Lloyd Wright Building Conservancy =

Historic preservation organization

The Frank Lloyd Wright Building Conservancy is an organization devoted to the historic preservation of buildings and their furnishings and decoration designed by American architect Frank Lloyd Wright, as well as to the study of Wright's career. The organization has grown since its founding in the late 1980s to have a worldwide membership reportedly numbering in the thousands.

It was the publisher of Bulletin: The Quarterly Newsletter of the Frank Lloyd Wright Building Conservancy (OCLC 22863442), which was published from Vol. 1, issue 1 (June 1990) – v. 19, no. 3 (summer 2009); the publication was continued by the semiannual SaveWright: The Magazine of the Frank Lloyd Wright Building Conservancy (OCLC 658925854), v. 1 no. 1, Spring 2010–.

The conservancy holds annual conferences which include educational sessions and tours of private homes. The conservancy also operates a support group for owners of Wright-designed homes, hosting Zoom meetings periodically, and it operates an online forum for discussions of Wright's designs. As of 2025, the conservancy has 730 members, about 10% of whom own houses designed by Wright. In 2026, the conservancy adopted a logo; it consists of a 4-by-4 grid of squares, with a missing square representing Wright designs that have been demolished.

== See also ==
- List of Frank Lloyd Wright works
