= 20th-Century Architecture of Frank Lloyd Wright =

UNESCO World Heritage Site

The 20th-Century Architecture of Frank Lloyd Wright
UNESCO World Heritage Site
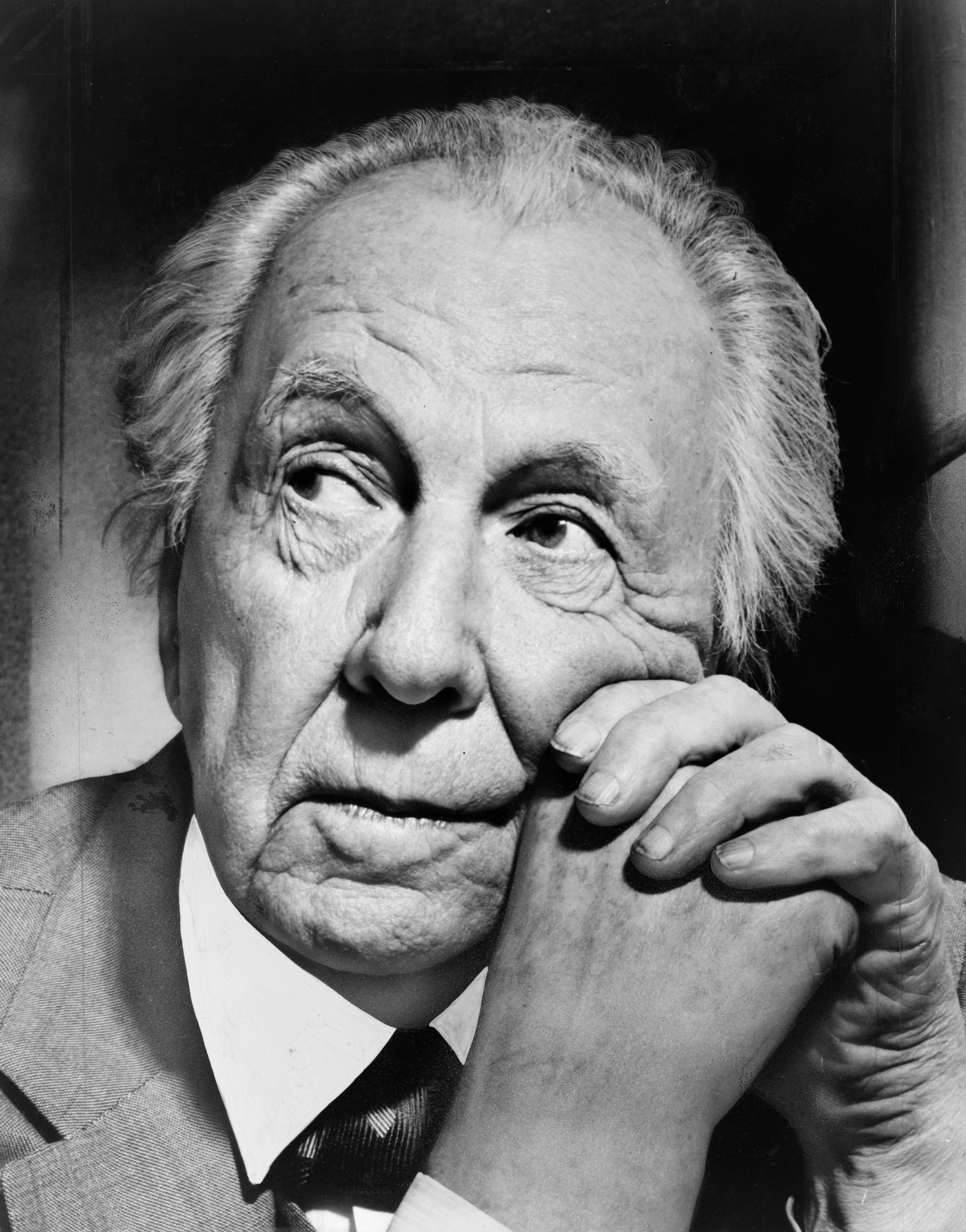
- Frank Lloyd Wright, the architect whose buildings are designated as a World Heritage Site
- Includes: Eight locations in the United States
- Criteria: Cultural: ii
- Reference: 1496
- Inscription: 2019 (43rd Session)
- Area: 26.369 ha (65.16 acres)
- Buffer zone: 710.103 ha (1,754.70 acres)

The 20th-Century Architecture of Frank Lloyd Wright is a UNESCO World Heritage Site consisting of eight buildings across the United States designed by the American architect Frank Lloyd Wright (1867–1959). These sites are designated because they exemplify his philosophy of organic architecture, in which he designed structures that harmonized with humanity and their environment. Wright's work had an international influence on the development of architecture in the 20th century.

The eight Wright buildings in the World Heritage Site are located in six U.S. states and were designed over a 50-year period. The first building included, Unity Temple, was completed in 1908. The last, the Guggenheim Museum, was completed in 1959, although its design had begun in the 1940s. All eight buildings are also listed as U.S. National Historic Landmarks. These structures were nominated because they were deemed "his masterpieces with the highest levels of integrity", because of their National Historic Landmark statuses, and because there were preservation plans in place for each building.

== Background ==
=== Wright's architecture ===
Wright, a native of Wisconsin, initially studied with noted architects in the Chicago school of architecture (particularly Louis Sullivan) before opening his own practice in 1893. He became a world-renowned architect in the 20th century. Wright's architectural practice occupied three studios throughout his lifetime: his Oak Park studio in Illinois (1889–1910), Taliesin in Wisconsin (1911–1959), and Taliesin West in Arizona (1937–1959).

Some of Wright's earliest independent works were in the Prairie style, in which he designed until the mid-1910s; these were characterized by interconnected interiors and horizontal exterior design details. These Prairie-style works included the Robie House and Unity Temple, both in Illinois. In the 1910s and 1920s, Wright designed several buildings in California influenced by Mayan Revival architecture, including the Hollyhock House. Wright received few commissions from the late 1920s until the mid-1930s, when he was hired to design the Fallingwater house in Pennsylvania. He began experimenting with Usonian architecture for middle-class Americans in 1936, when he designed the Herbert and Katherine Jacobs First House in Wisconsin. Wright increasingly used non-rectilinear motifs—such as triangles, hexagons, and spirals—in his final years, incorporating spiral shapes into the Solomon R. Guggenheim Museum in New York.

=== Nomination history ===
Through efforts led by the Frank Lloyd Wright Building Conservancy, a nonprofit organization, Taliesin and Taliesin West were jointly nominated as a World Heritage Site in the late 1980s. The U.S. federal government endorsed the nomination, but UNESCO declined to grant the designation at the time, as it wanted to see a larger nomination with more Wright properties. In 2008, the National Park Service submitted ten Wright properties to a tentative World Heritage list. It grew to 11 structures across seven U.S. states in July 2011, out of more than 400 buildings reviewed by Wright experts. The nomination included two of Wright's studios, two office buildings, four private residences, one museum, one church, and one government building.

The S. C. Johnson & Son Inc. Administration Building and Research Tower in Racine, Wisconsin, was removed from the nomination at the request of its owner. In March 2015, the United States Department of the Interior again nominated ten Wright–designed structures for inclusion on the World Heritage List. UNESCO declined to designate Wright's buildings in July 2016, referring the nomination back to the Frank Lloyd Wright Building Conservancy for revision. The Conservancy–led Frank Lloyd Wright World Heritage Council collaborated with the National Park Service and UNESCO to modify the nomination. Eight of Wright's buildings were re-nominated to the World Heritage List in December 2018. The Price Tower in Bartlesville, Oklahoma, and the Marin County Civic Center in San Rafael, California, which had been part of the 2015 nomination, were excluded from the updated proposal. The International Council on Monuments and Sites recommended the nomination's approval in June 2019.

The 20th-Century Architecture of Frank Lloyd Wright was inscribed on the World Heritage list on July 7, 2019. The buildings were deemed to meet criterion 2 (exhibiting an important development in architecture) of the selection criteria for cultural sites. The World Heritage listing was the 24th in the United States to be designated, and it was the first time that modern American architecture had been recognized by UNESCO.

== Sites ==
Properties included in the World Heritage Site
Name	Picture	UNESCO ID	State	City	Coordinates	Description	Property area Buffer zone (Note: The buffer zone is an area surrounding a listed site that provides additional protection but is not part of the site itself.)
Unity Temple	Facade of Unity Temple, a concrete structure with few windows and many rectangular design details	1496rev-001	Illinois	Oak Park	41°53′18″N 87°47′48″W	Completed in 1908, it was one of the first major reinforced concrete buildings in the United States. The building provides a spacious sanctuary, along with a church house called the Unity House. The building's use of concrete has led to it being described as the world's first "modern building". Its high walls separate its sanctuary from the urban street, and Wright's use of high clerestory windows and large stained glass skylight provide light to the space in a natural color palette of yellow, green, and brown.	0.167 ha (0.41 acres) 10.067 ha (24.88 acres)
Frederick C. Robie House	Facade of the Frederick C. Robie House, a brick building with rectangular corners and overhanging low roofs on multiple levels	1496rev-002	Illinois	Chicago	41°47′23.4″N 87°35′45.3″W	This 1910 single-family home was designed in the Prairie style for a Chicago businessman. The exterior has a heavy emphasis on horizontal design details, including cantilevered roofs, which, combined with the open plan interior, "epitomizes Wright's aim to design structures in harmony with nature." There are 175 leaded glass windows and doors, which contain abstract organic shapes, contribute significantly to the concept of bringing nature indoors.	0.130 ha (0.32 acres) 1.315 ha (3.25 acres)
Taliesin	Exterior of Taliesin, a group of stone buildings with low roofs, as seen from a hill	1496rev-003	Wisconsin	Spring Green	43°08′30″N 90°04′15″W	Begun in 1911 and expanded several times over the years, Taliesin (Welsh for "shining brow") became Wright's home, studio, and school of architecture. He built the large estate on the brow of a ridge, to be "'of the hill' not on it". While there, he explored the organic theory of architecture and the Prairie School. Taliesin largely incorporates rectangular shapes in its design, and Wright sought to reflect the surrounding landscape in details ranging from the rooflines and walls to the materials and coloring.	4.931 ha (12.18 acres) 200.899 ha (496.43 acres)
Hollyhock House	Facade of the Hollyhock House, a one-story house with Mayan motifs on the facade. It is surrounded by a garden.	1496rev-004	California	Los Angeles	34°05′59.85″N 118°17′40.61″W	Hollyhock House, built from 1919 to 1921 for the oil heiress Aline Barnsdall, was Wright's first Los Angeles commission. Intended as part of an ultimately unbuilt arts colony and live theater complex, the house incorporates extensive motifs depicting Barnsdall's favorite flower, the hollyhock. The structure's outdoor gardens and interior spaces are integrated, with features such as a central courtyard and a series of terraces. The work of Wright and his young apprentices helped inspire what became known as California Modernism.	4.608 ha (11.39 acres) 13.986 ha (34.56 acres)
Fallingwater	Facade of Fallingwater, a house with white concrete terraces over a waterfall	1496rev-005	Pennsylvania	Stewart Township	39°54′22″N 79°28′5″W	Fallingwater was built as a summer home for the businessman Edgar J. Kaufmann in 1936–1937. Placed over a stream and waterfall, it includes design details such as cantilevered concrete terraces and a rock chimney, intended to blend with the setting's natural rock formations. Wright wanted the Kaufmanns to not just look out at the stream on their summer property but "live with the waterfall ... as an integral part of [their] lives". American Institute of Architects members voted Fallingwater "the best all-time work of American architecture" in 1991.	11.212 ha (27.71 acres) 282.299 ha (697.58 acres)
Herbert and Katherine Jacobs House	Facade of the Herbert and Katherine Jacobs House, a single-story wood-and-glass house. There is a garden in the foreground.	1496rev-006	Wisconsin	Madison	43°3′31″N 89°26′29″W	Built during the Great Depression for the journalist Herbert Jacobs, the Jacobs House I (1937) was one of the first "Usonian" houses designed by Wright. Working with a budget of less than $5,000, Wright combined his open design plan, functional spaces, and the use of wood, brick, dyed concrete, and large windows to match a small landscaped neighborhood lot. Some of the house's design features, such as its concrete pad, flat roof, and carport, later became commonplace.	0.139 ha (0.34 acres) 1.286 ha (3.18 acres)
Taliesin West	Exterior of Taliesin West, a group of buildings made of rocks and concrete, which surround a pool	1496rev-007	Arizona	Scottsdale	33°36′22.8″N 111°50′45.5″W	In 1937, Wright began building his winter home, studio, and architectural fellowship center in the foothills of Arizona's McDowell Mountains. The property was built using locally- sourced construction materials, such as rocks and trees. The design included few vertical lines or right angles, and it has ribbed walls and gently sloped terraces, reflecting the appearance of the nearby mountains. Taliesin West was set within the landscape with overlapping indoor and outdoor rooms, a triangular garden of native plants, and triangular pool. Wright worked on designs for many of his later structures while at Taliesin West.	4.285 ha (10.59 acres) 198.087 ha (489.48 acres)
Solomon R. Guggenheim Museum	Facade of the Solomon R. Guggenheim Museum, a concrete structure with a curving white facade	1496rev-008	New York	New York	40°46′59″N 73°57′32″W	The Guggenheim Museum was completed in 1959 as a modern art museum for the Guggenheim Foundation. The massing contains two spiraling structures, a six-story main gallery and a smaller "monitor", which are connected at the second story. Inside, paintings are mounted onto bars protruding from the sloped walls. The museum's spiral massing is placed across from Central Park, an allusion to natural forms.	0.251 ha (0.62 acres) 2.164 ha (5.35 acres)

The 20th-Century Architecture of Frank Lloyd Wright – Locations in the United States

== See also ==
- List of World Heritage Sites in the United States
