= Herbert and Katherine Jacobs Second House =

Hemicycle house in Madison, Wisconsin, US

- U.S. National Register of Historic Places
- U.S. National Historic Landmark
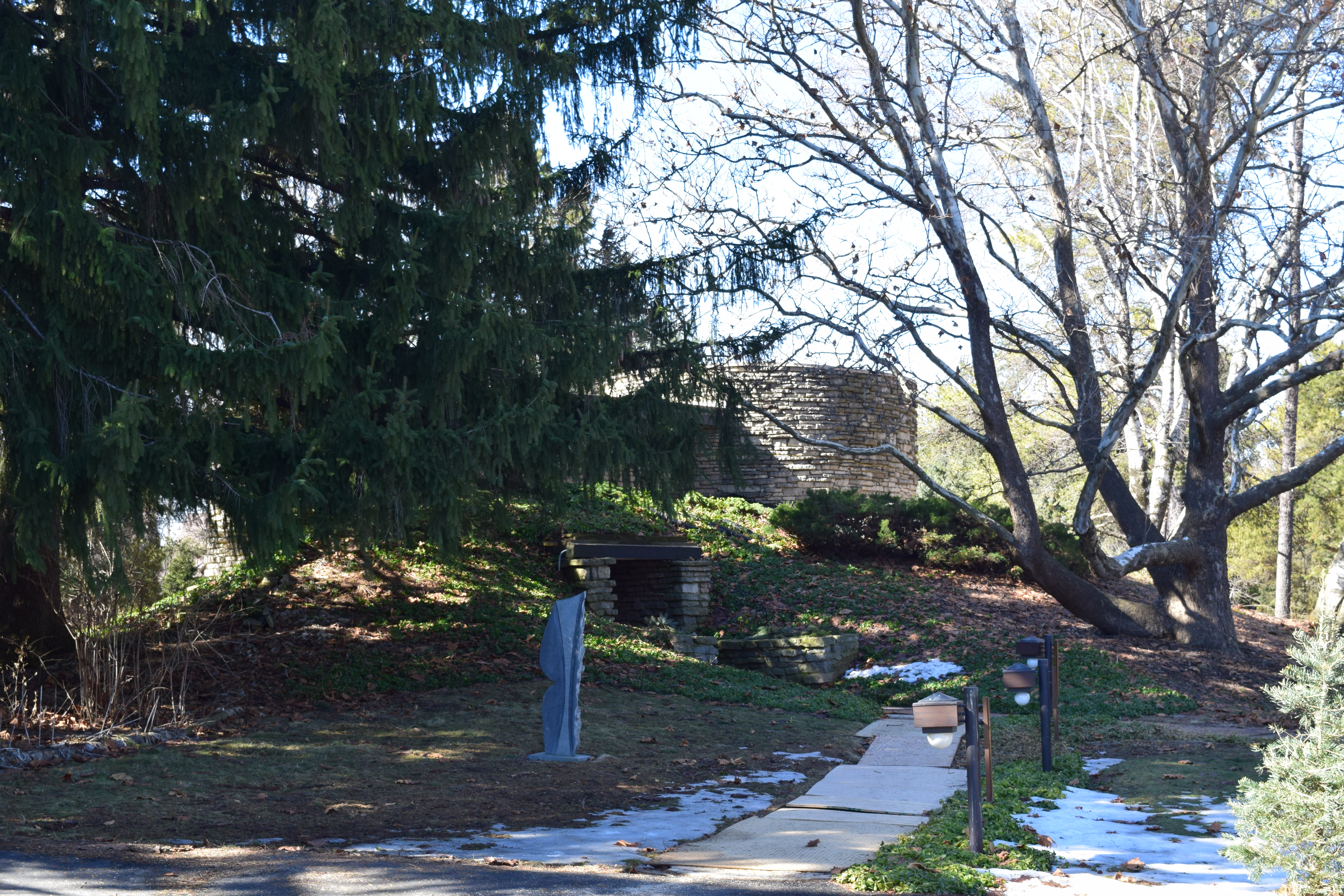
- The tunnel entrance on the northeast, the back of the berm, and the tower

- Location within Wisconsin Location within the United States
- Location: 3995 Shawn Trail; Madison, Wisconsin; United States
- Coordinates: 43°4′26″N 89°32′5″W
- Built: 1946–1948
- Architect: Frank Lloyd Wright
- Architectural style: Modern Movement
- NRHP reference No.: 74000074

Significant dates
- Added to NRHP: December 31, 1974
- Designated NHL: July 31, 2003

The Herbert and Katherine Jacobs Second House (also known as Jacobs II or the Solar Hemicycle) is a house in Madison, Wisconsin, United States. Designed by Frank Lloyd Wright and built in 1946–1948, the house was designed for the journalist Herbert Jacobs and his wife Katherine, whose first house he had designed a decade earlier. The Solar Hemicycle name is derived from the house's semicircular-arc floor plan, its use of natural materials, and its energy-saving orientation. The Jacobs Second House has been praised for its architecture over the years, and Wright went on to design other houses with circular design motifs. The house was added to the National Register of Historic Places in 1974 and declared a National Historic Landmark in 2003.

The Jacobs family moved to western Madison, near Middleton, in 1942, and commissioned Wright to design them a new residence. After they rejected his first design, Wright proposed the Solar Hemicycle, which was partially embedded into an earthen berm. Although the Jacobses paid the first part of Wright's fee in early 1944, construction did not start for over two years. The Jacobses ended up constructing much of the house themselves because of contractor delays and a misunderstanding that prompted Wright to resign. The family moved into the house's root cellar in July 1948 and occupied the rest of the house that September. The professor William R. Taylor bought the house in 1962; he lived there with his family until 1968, before renting it to college students. His son Bill Taylor bought the house in 1982 and renovated it. In 1988, the house was sold once again to John and Betty Moore, who rebuilt the roof and added a garage in the 2000s.

The northern elevation of the house's facade is partially built into a berm, with a circular, stone-faced staircase tower protruding from it. On the southern elevation is a curved glass wall, which faces a sunken garden surrounded by a stone terrace. The house is topped by a flat roof with overhanging eaves, and it is accessed by a tunnel that travels through the berm. The first floor contains a root cellar, an open plan living–dining room, and a kitchen, in addition to a pool that is partly indoors and partly outdoors. Suspended from the ceiling is the second floor, which contains three bedrooms and a bathroom.

== History ==
=== Background ===
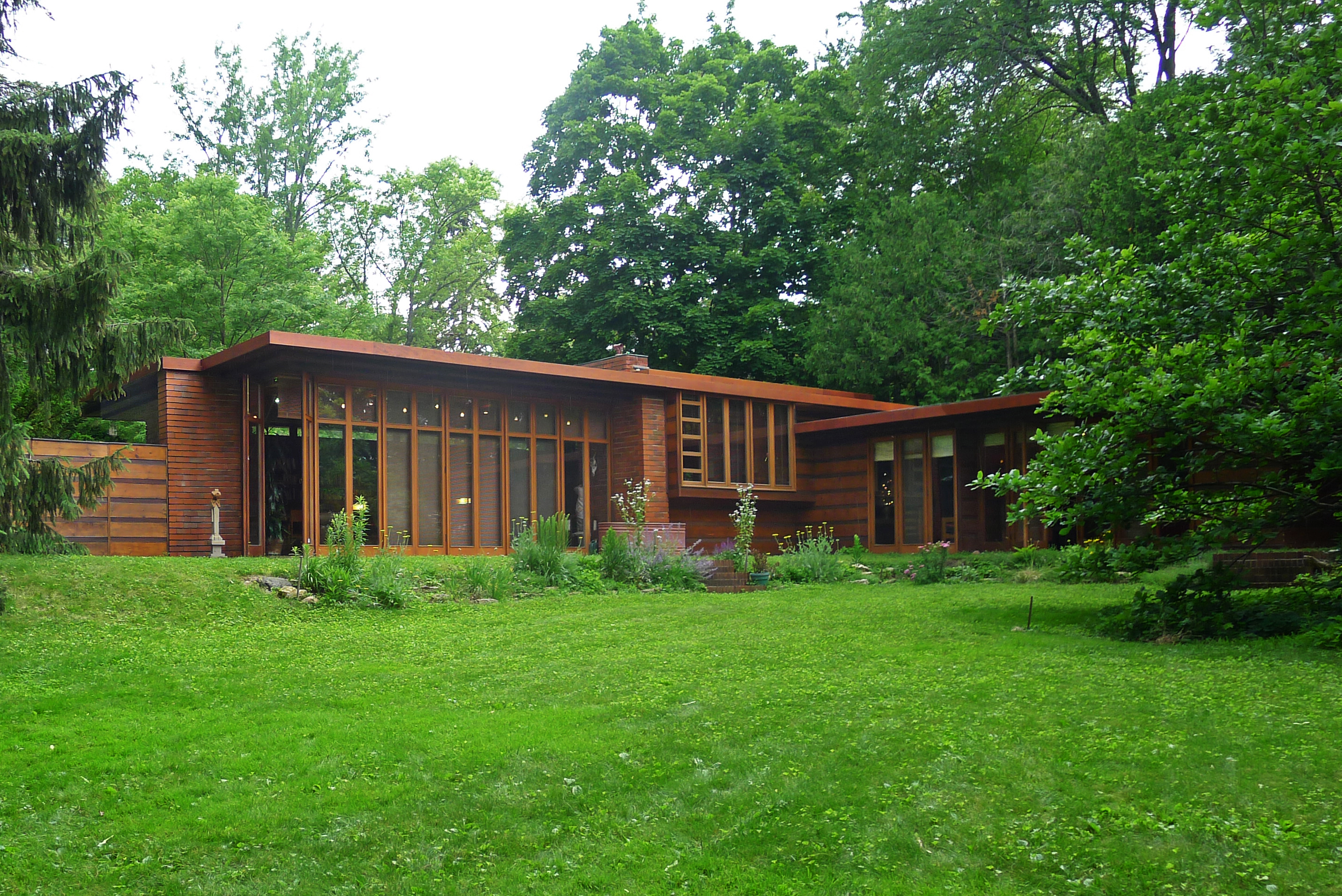
The Jacobs First House

Until the 1930s, Frank Lloyd Wright mostly designed houses for wealthy clients, but he was also beginning to design lower-cost Usonian houses for middle-class families. In 1936, the journalist Herbert Jacobs asked Wright to design his family a house that cost no more than $5,000; at the time, Jacobs was a young reporter with a very limited budget. This became the Jacobs First House (or Jacobs I) on Toepfer Avenue, into which the Jacobses moved in 1937. Jacobs I, sometimes cited as Wright's first Usonian house, elicited high amounts of interest from the general public when it was completed. The first house, an L-shaped structure with a central lawn and approximately 1,550 square feet (144 m^{2}), had three bedrooms. In contrast to the family's second house, which was designed in a rural area in an organic style, Jacobs I was more urban in nature, and its lawn was more similar to a courtyard.

Not much was done with passive solar heating in modern buildings in the U.S. until 1933, when Fred Keck noticed on a cold winter day that his demonstration glass House of Tomorrow, in Chicago, was warming inside before the furnace had been installed. The Massachusetts Institute of Technology and Columbia University investigated solar-heated buildings in the late 1930s. During the same period, Keck built several houses that could store water on their flat roofs; as the water evaporated, it cooled the houses. Keck also designed a "solar house" in Glenview, Illinois, with extended eaves and a south-facing glass wall, which were designed to admit sun through the glass in winter and shade the house in summer.

=== Development ===
==== Land acquisition ====
In 1942, the Jacobses and their two children (Note: Some sources cite the Jacobses as having three children at the time. However, news reports indicate that their son William was born in September 1943, shortly after the move.) moved to a farmhouse in western Madison, near Middleton, about 6 miles (9.7 km) away from the first house. The family also acquired a 52-acre (21 ha) farm surrounding the farmhouse. In spite of Wright's efforts to convince them to keep the first house, the family felt that the area surrounding their first house was becoming too densely built-up. In addition, they felt that their daughters Susan and Elizabeth (who were respectively seven and three years old) would be better-behaved if they lived on a farm.

According to Herb, he and his wife had decided to move after contemplating the matter for only a short period; Herb wrote about his intention to sell the first house on September 6, and they moved to the farm on November 13. The family left the first house's built-in furniture in place, buying an old truck to carry their remaining possessions to the farm. While the farmhouse was habitable, it was rundown. Herb recalled that he had to clean up the farmhouse before they could even move. Afterward, they bought farm equipment and obtained livestock, farming the land even while Herb retained his day job at The Capital Times. Herb and Katherine, with their children's help, were able to produce all of their food at the farm.

==== Design ====
From the outset, the Jacobses wanted Wright to design another house on their farmland, having liked the original house so much. In early 1943, Herb asked Wright to consider designing a new home for the family, to which the architect agreed. The family traveled to Wright's Taliesin studio several times to discuss the plans. During this time, Wright began developing experimental design features, and the Jacobses allowed him to use their new house as a testing ground for these features. For example, Wright hired a fiberboard company to design a specialized fiberboard wall for the Jacobses' second house, but the company declined to do so because Wright wanted the company to pay an exorbitant fee to use the design. That July, Wright visited the Jacobs farm, whereupon he decided to build the house on a hill with oak woods behind it. Though an even taller hill existed on the site, Wright recommended against using that site, correctly predicting that the higher hill would likely be destroyed due to highway widening.

In December 1943, Wright invited the Jacobses to Taliesin to view a preliminary design for the house. The original design called for a square, double-height living room with a mezzanine, in addition to a single-story wing containing a master bedroom, two smaller bedrooms, and a bathroom; this plan would have cost $12,000. The National Park Service cites the design as a modification of a plan that was originally created for the Hein family in Chippewa Falls, Wisconsin, while Herb said that Wright had offered to give the design to the Hein family if the Jacobses did not accept it. In any case, the Jacobses rejected the plan, saying that the design was expensive and overly difficult to heat. Wright acknowledged the family's financial constraints and agreed to create an alternative design.

The following February, Wright presented to the Jacobses a revised plan, telling them that "you are getting another 'first'" and describing the design as suitable for any hilltop exposed to wind. The design consisted of a crescent-shaped structure measuring 88 feet (27 m) long along its outer arc facing north, 60 feet (18 m) long along its inner arc facing south, and 17 feet (5.2 m) wide. The inner arc of the crescent, facing south, would be made of glass; the remaining walls would be made of stone, and the northern facade would be built into the side of a hill. The concept of the house was so novel that Wright had difficulties deciding on a name; he initially referred to the plans as the "Solar Hemicyclo" (after the Greek term for a semicircle) before changing the name to "Solar Hemicycle". In addition, Wright's second plan initially called for a roof that was creased in the middle, and the second story was to be supported by columns on the first floor. Wright later revised the plans to remove the columns and flatten the roof.

==== Construction ====
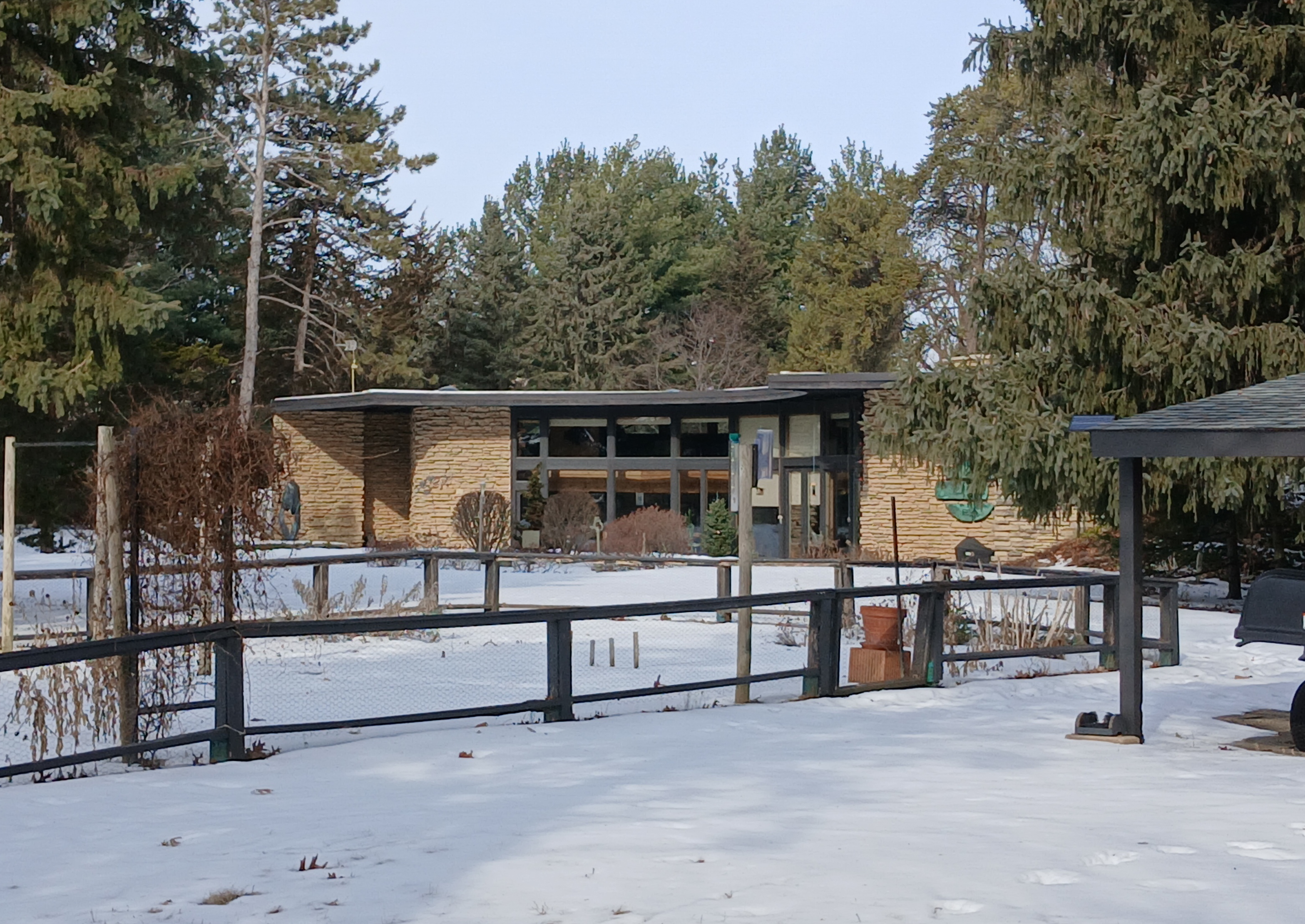
View of the house from the sun-facing side in 2026

The Jacobses paid Wright the first installment of his fee, amounting to $250, in March 1944. Wright's son-in-law William Wesley Peters wrote to the Jacobses the next month, notifying them that Wright had nearly completed the plans for the house itself and that Peters was designing them a barn. The Jacobses did not receive detailed plans for two years, despite frequent requests. In the meantime, the Jacobses built an easy chair for the house in early 1945, and they sometimes visited Taliesin to inquire about the house's design. Herb wrote that he had grown impatient by early 1946, when he asked a bank in Madison to give them a loan for the house; the loan was denied because the house was not in Madison. Ultimately, they obtained a loan from the Haley brothers, who had helped fund the Jacobs First House. The family initially hoped that the house would not cost more than $5,000.

Herb wrote that he had received a response from Wright only after writing a poem to the architect on August 15, 1946. Eight days later, Wright arrived to survey the site and draw out plans for an access road. Still, the Jacobses did not receive blueprints for some time. In October 1946, Wright's apprentices excavated the house's site with a bulldozer, and moved the soil from the sunken garden to construct the berm north of the house. Local farmhands refused to dig the foundations without a bulldozer, while a contractor with a bulldozer could not dig them because the berm was in the way. As a result, Herb personally dug the holes for the house's foundation during his free time, completing it in January 1947; his children helped fill in the holes with $20 worth of crushed rock.

The Jacobses ended up doing much of the construction by themselves. Wright's apprentices surveyed the house in June 1947, and the couple built a 6-square-foot (0.56 m^{2}) section of wall to test out their masonry-laying skills. Herb hired the stonemason Johnny Luginbuhl that August, but Luginbuhl worked for only a couple days in August and one in October. Wright also severed his involvement with the project due to a misunderstanding over We Chose the Country, a book that Herb was writing; the architect had taken particular offense to a sentence implying that Wright had asked Herb for help. Just after Wright left, Luginbuhl and his apprentices returned again in March and began working on the house in earnest, while Katherine assisted in laying the masonry. Wright's departure also allowed the Jacobses to make changes to the design and add a root cellar without having to fear Wright's mercurial response. The Jacobses hired several contractors to help complete the house.

=== Completion and Jacobs ownership ===
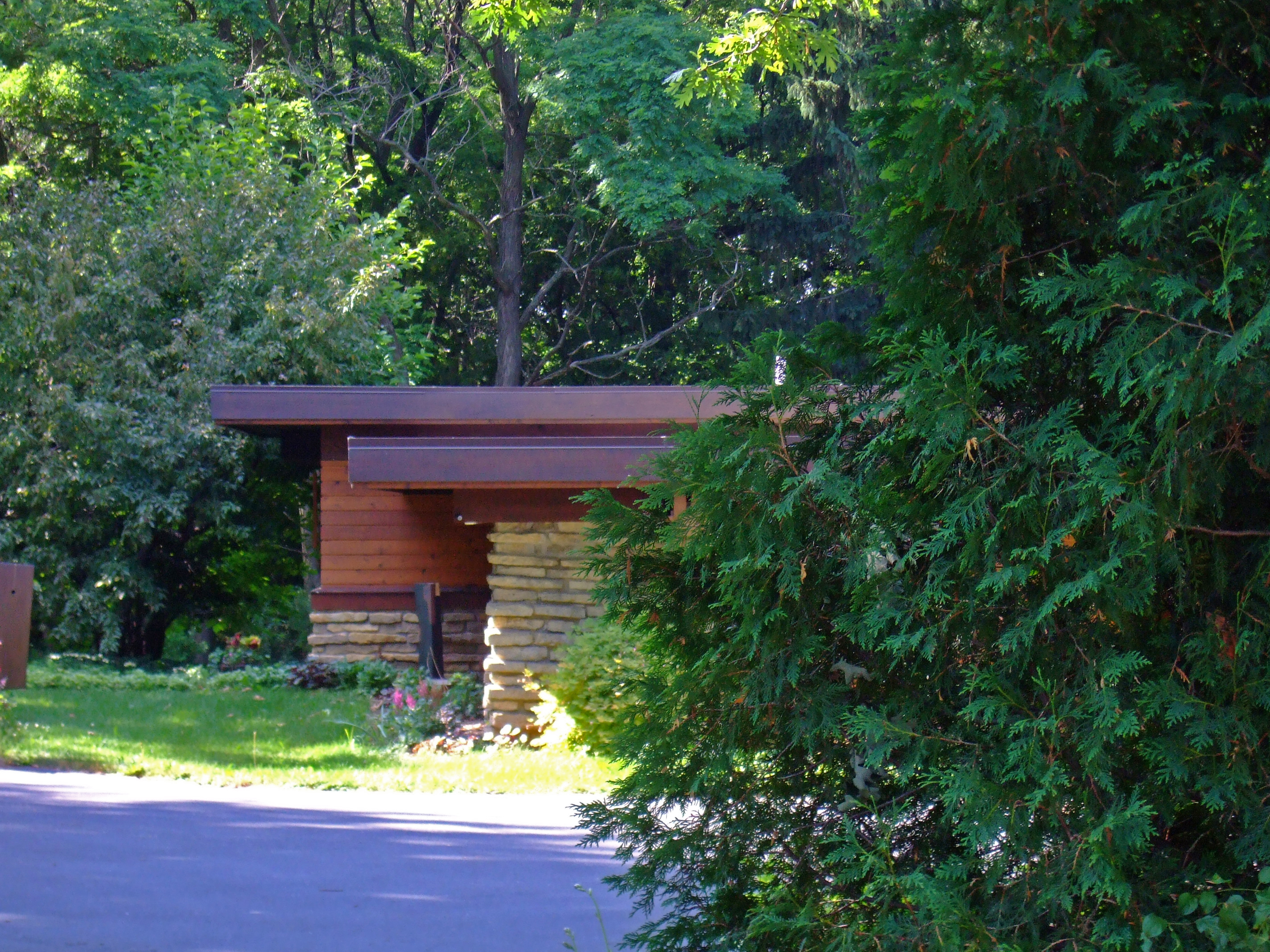
Driveway to the Jacobs Second House

The Jacobses had sold their farmhouse in February 1948, expecting that they would be able to move into the new house by July 1; when the new house was still incomplete on that day, the farmhouse's new owners allowed them to stay for another week. This gave the family enough time to fit out the root cellar, into which they moved on July 8. The family also visited Wright, who expressed his continued displeasure not only with Herb's manuscript, but also the modifications that had been made to his design. The Jacobses finished the rest of the house, which included pouring concrete for the floor slab, excavating the indoor portion of the pool, constructing the wooden mullions, and completing the roof. They then built the support beams for the second floor, and a contractor built some tables for them. The family also constructed the terrace outside the house on their own. The Jacobses moved into the main house at the end of August 1948. The final cost of construction has been cited as $20,000. (Note: Herb Jacobs wrote that the material and labor costs might have been as high as $25,000, though this figure included the cost of a barn, well, and pump near the house. The Berkeley Gazette cites a lower figure of $10,000.)

Shortly after the Jacobses moved in, Wright visited unannounced; satisfied that the house had been built mostly to his original specifications, he silently ended their estrangement and helped them finish the house, sending a bulldozer to shape the berm. Parts of the house remained exposed to the elements until September, and the Jacobses held their first party at the house shortly thereafter. Over the following months, Herb finished the bedroom partitions, and Luginbuhl built the stone flower boxes outdoors. Because the Jacobses had not followed Wright's design precisely, they had to repair parts of the house, including the hot-water systems and the carport roof, within a year of its completion. The Jacobses were still working on the interior as late as 1958, when Herb finished assembling a dining table that Wright had designed for the house. Other minor aspects of Wright's design, such as cupboards, were not carried out.

After the house was completed, passersby frequently tried to catch a glimpse of it, and one newspaper wrote that Katherine Jacobs had become well-known in the local area for her masonry skills. The family reported that, even during the depths of winter, the heating system could be turned off at 9 a.m. and did not have to be reactivated until late afternoon. The Jacobses sometimes hosted events, such as afternoon teas and house tours. The house also garnered attention from members of the general public, prompting the Jacobses to charge a 50-cent admission fee. Herb wrote that his visitors had included a Swiss architect who hiked several miles in the snow, in addition to an Illinois farmer named Robert Muirhead (who later commissioned Wright to design the Muirhead House for him). Wright and the Jacobses remained friends for life after the house was completed. The architect sometimes brought prospective clients by to look at the house, turning away those who disliked it; Wright sometimes came at odd hours without advance warning, since he felt a sense of proprietorship over the house.

=== Subsequent ownership ===
All three of the Jacobses' children had begun to move away in the late 1950s: their two daughters moved to California and Arizona after marrying, while their son began attending Reed College in Portland, Oregon, in 1961. The Jacobses sold the house in 1962 and moved to California to be near their daughter Elizabeth. (Note: Storrer 1993, p. 242, says that they moved to California in 1962 to be near their daughter and son-in-law, without specifying which daughter. In Jacobs & Jacobs 1978, p. 142, Herb writes that his elder daughter Susan moved to Arizona, while his younger daughter Elizabeth moved to California.) William R. Taylor, a history professor at the University of Wisconsin–Madison, acquired the building that year, moving there with his wife and five children. The Taylors lived there until 1968; they then moved out and rented the house to students for thirteen years. A local real-estate agent said that the students chopped firewood and hosted parties in the house. According to William's son Bill, the house fell into disrepair not because of any particular person, but because the cost of maintenance and the expertise required to repair it were both beyond Bill's means. Still, the house was well-known, and random visitors showed up at the house on fair-weather days; the building also hosted private tours.

==== Bill Taylor renovation ====
In mid-1982, Bill Taylor acquired the house from his mother Donna. By then, the frames for the door and window openings were rotting, while the radiant heating system was no longer functioning; the family spent $3,500 annually on heating. Bill recalled that the house was persistently cold, even though the family used 3,500 U.S. gallons (13,000 L; 2,900 imp gal) of heating oil each winter. The heating system's pipes had not been insulated, so a large portion of the heat was dispersed into the gravel below the slab, rather than rising through the living spaces. The 1,500-square-foot (140 m^{2}) roof was also not insulated, and it had been weakened over the years because the entirety of the second floor was suspended from the roof. The thin glass wall, the roof, the berm, the floor, and air infiltration were all equally responsible for the heat loss.

Bill hired the contracting firm of John Freiburger and Associates to replace the windows on the south facade, repairing the window frames and fascia, insulating the roof, adding structural supports, and replacing the heating system. During the renovation, the Taylors lived in a trailer. Freiburger finished the exterior work by December 1982. Afterward, most of the floor was demolished and re-poured, with insulation installed beneath the slab and the pipes embedded into the concrete; a small portion of the original floor slab, beneath the south facade's glass wall, was retained. Bill also added a hot air furnace and air conditioning, repartitioned the bedrooms into three, strengthened the joists and rafters, and added skylights.

Ultimately, Bill spent $50,000 on the project, even after doing some of the work himself. The heating system alone cost $11,000, but it halved the Taylors' annual heating bill from $3,500 to $1,700. For his restoration of the house, Bill received an award from the Capital Community Citizens in 1983 and a Dane County Historic Preservation Award in 1984. The next year, the house opened to the public for a fundraising benefit for the American Players Theatre. Three years after the original renovation, Bill rebuilt the south facade again due to water leakage, retaining some of the glass from the first renovation while adding a third layer of panes.

==== Sale to the Moore family ====
Bill Taylor sought to sell it by the late 1980s, saying that "the house is impossible to childproof" and that some design elements posed an active danger to his 17-month-old daughter. Taylor placed one-third of the 6-acre property for sale. He rejected offers of $280,000 for the house, which he felt to be too low, but lowered the asking price after failing to sell the house for three years.

John and Elizabeth Moore ultimately acquired the house in 1989. The roof continued to leak through the 2000s, prompting the Moore family to rebuild it in 2007. The Moores also constructed a garage–studio, incorporating an existing wall into the new structure. After the garage was completed, the Madison Trust for Historic Preservation gave an award to the house's owners for "compatible new construction" in 2008. In addition, in the 2010s, Bill Taylor set up a website chronicling the house's history. The Jacobs Second House continues to be used as a private residence in the 21st century, and John and Elizabeth Moore owned the house as of 2026. It has sometimes been included on guided tours.

== Description ==
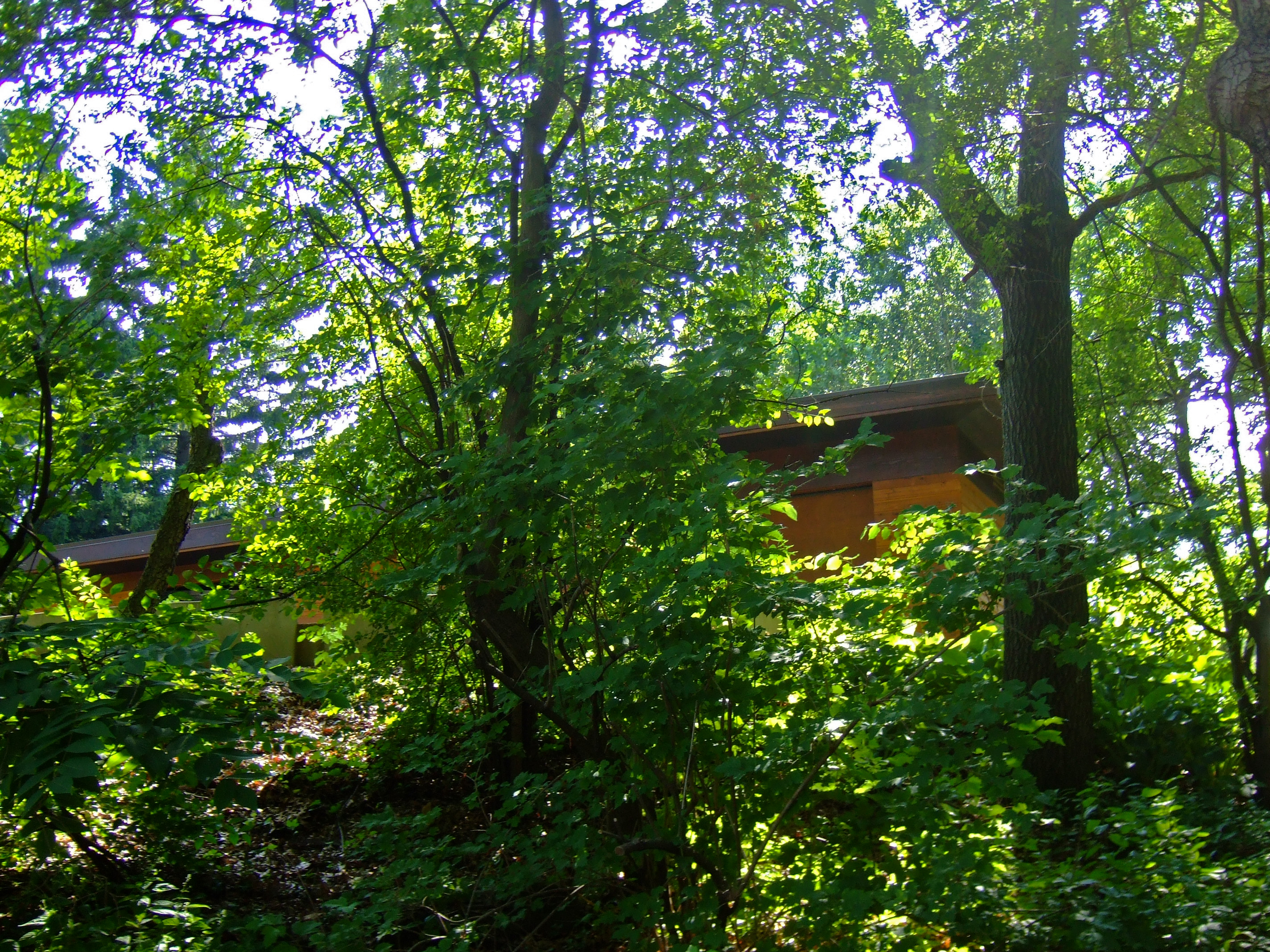
View of the house behind some trees

The house is variously cited as being located at 3995 Shawn Trail or 7033 Old Sauk Road in Madison, Wisconsin, United States, near Middleton. Originally, the house's official address was on Old Sauk Road, where the Jacobses owned 52 acres (21 ha). Due to increasing suburban development over the years, the property had been downsized to 6 acres (2.4 ha) by the 2000s, and the address was moved to Shawn Trail. The Jacobs Second House shares design elements with the earth shelter homes that became popular in the late 20th century. The house is one of several buildings designed by Wright in Madison, along with others such as the Jacobs First House, the Gilmore "Airplane" House, and the First Unitarian Society of Madison. By the 1980s, it was one of eight Wright-designed buildings remaining in Dane County.

The house is two stories tall and is shaped like a semicircular arc. Wright may have adapted the design from his unbuilt 1942 design for Lloyd Burlingham at El Paso. The house's massing, and its positioning on the side of a hill, allowed strong wind gusts and cold air to go around the house, instead of pressing against it. The floor plan is arranged around a grid of radial lines that converge in the garden, (Note: The radial lines converge 28 feet (8.5 m) beyond the south wall, which means the south wall forms an arc of 28-foot radius. Since the house is 17 feet (5.2 m) wide, the north wall forms an arc of 45-foot (14 m) radius.) dividing the house into sections with a central angle of 6 degrees. Wright referred to the Jacobs Second House as the "Solar Hemicycle", a name derived from the house's semicircular layout, use of natural materials, and solar energy-saving orientation. Some of the house's design features—such as the building's arrangement around a garden, concrete floor slab, and flat roof—were adapted from the Jacobs First House.

=== Exterior ===
==== Form and facade ====
The northern elevation of the facade, which follows the outer edge of the arc-shaped layout, is partly built into an earthen berm. The outermost 30 degrees of the arc, on either side, are decorated with flower boxes and two double-story boxes that are built into the berm. The eastern box leads to an access tunnel that passes through the berm, while the western box is unoccupied. There is a narrow band of clerestory windows just above the berm, allowing light and air to enter the rear of the house and providing ventilation during the summer. The mostly-flat roof slopes slightly downward to the north, directing water onto the berm. The original roof was made of tar and gravel and was supported by rafters. The rooftop eaves on either side of the house protrude 10 feet (3.0 m), while the eave along the house's southern facade is 5 feet (1.5 m) deep. The eaves rested on flitch beams, which in turn were bolted to the masonry.

The portion of the northern facade beneath the berm, and the walls at the western and eastern ends of the arc, are all made of stone. The exterior stonework consists of limestone slabs, which are laid horizontally, with alternating protruding and recessed stones to give the impression of natural outcrops. The stone is sourced from a nearby quarry; this was consistent with other Wright buildings such as Taliesin, the First Unitarian Society of Madison, and Fallingwater, which also used locally quarried stone. Protruding from the berm is a circular, castle keep–style tower made of limestone, with a diameter of 18 feet (5.5 m). The tower, one of the only parts of the house that is visible from the north, may be based on the architecture of Lambay Castle in Dublin, designed by Edwin Lutyens.

The southern elevation, which follows the inner edge of the arc, is made of glass, consisting of 1/4-inch-thick (6.4 mm) panes salvaged from old stores. The glass wall measures 48 feet (15 m) wide and 14 feet (4.3 m) tall. The design allowed sunlight to warm the house's concrete floor slab during the winter, when the sun was low in the sky; during January, the south facade was exposed to sunlight for 44% of the day. In summer, the wide eave above shields the glass wall from the heat of the higher-angled sun. The glass windows and doors were originally separated by eight mullions, which are placed every 6 feet (1.8 m); the outermost windows are spaced 3 feet (0.91 m) away from the walls at each end of the facade. Each of the doors and windows were surrounded by frames measuring 4 inches (100 mm) wide, with two vertical supports built behind each frame. Originally, the doorknobs were positioned low enough that the Jacobses' young children were able to open them.

Also on the southern facade is a circular fish pool, which is partially indoors and partially outdoors to visually connect the house's interior with the sunken garden outside. The pool, measuring 12 feet (3.7 m) in diameter, is bisected by a concrete divider under the facade, which splits it into a shallow basin indoors and a deeper plunge pool outdoors. When the house was renovated in the 1980s, the original south-facing windows were replaced with triple-pane glass, and the red wood of the glass facade was painted black. In addition, several of the original glass doors on the south facade were removed, and the frames were replaced with rectangular beams, which were more simple in design.

==== Garden and ancillary structures ====
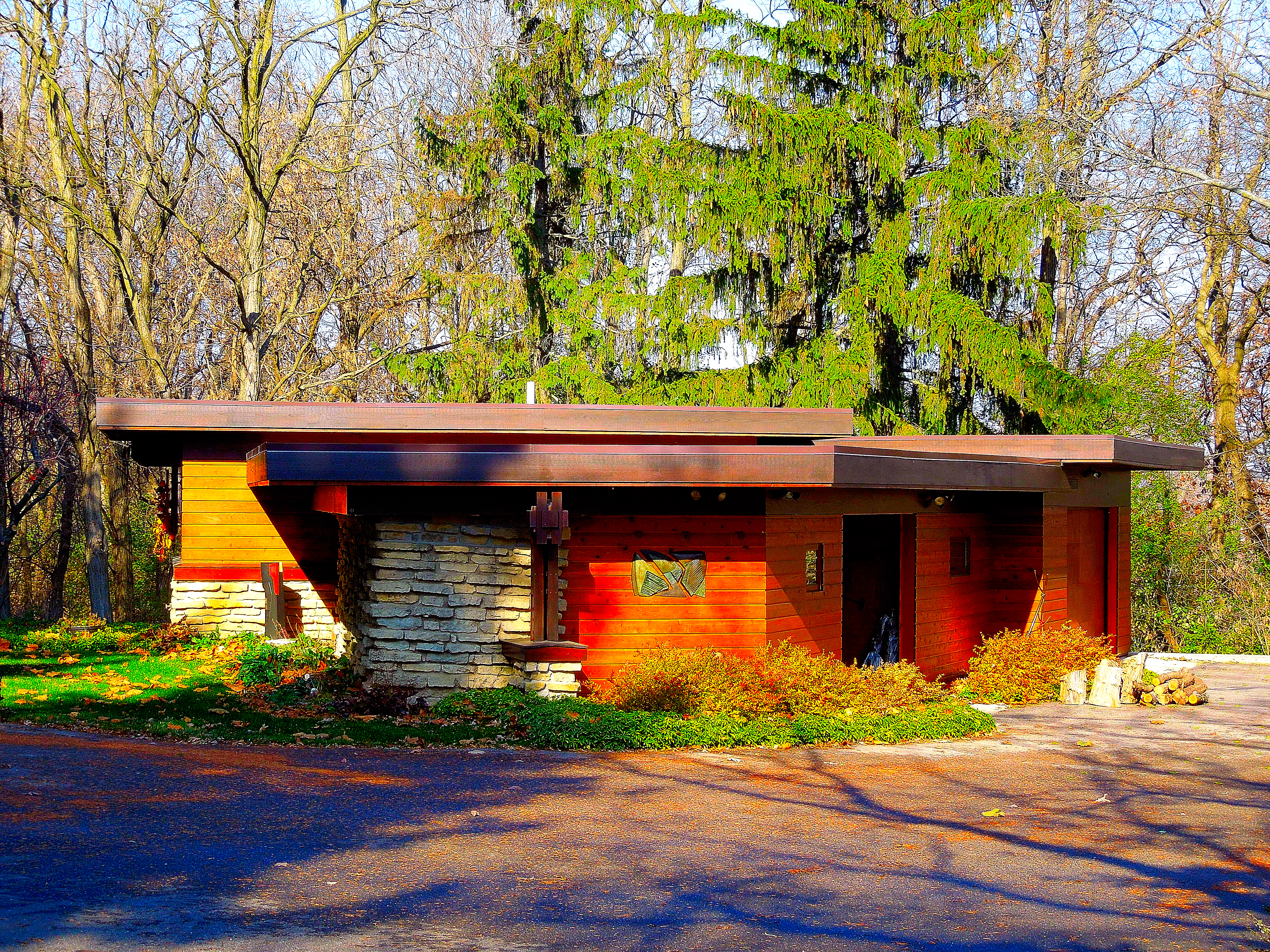
The house's garage, which was not designed by Wright

South of the house is a stone terrace measuring 8 feet (2.4 m) wide, which rests on an 8-inch-thick (200 mm) layer of crushed gravel. The terrace continues to the house's western end, where it is surrounded by stone walls on two sides, and to the house's eastern end, where it links with the house's access tunnel. The stone terrace, in turn, surrounds the house's sunken garden, which is 4 feet (1.2 m) below the floor level of the house. Wright claimed that the presence of the sunken garden would create a pocket of air, which would be deflected above the house's roof in a similar manner to an airfoil. By the 2000s, the Moores had added sculptures, a sundial, and stone benches to the sunken garden.

The house also has a garage, which was completed in the 2000s and was not designed by Wright. The original plan had called for the house's access tunnel to be extended north of the berm, with the construction of a covered walkway connecting to a barn north of the house, but this idea was canceled.

=== Interior ===
The Madison city government cites the house as having a floor area of 2,528 square feet (234.9 m^{2}), though other sources give different figures. (Note: The house is cited as having a total floor area of 2,162 square feet (200.9 m^{2}), 2,400 square feet (220 m^{2}), 2,500 square feet (230 m^{2}), or 2,650 square feet (246 m^{2}).) The interior floor layout is based on the 6-degree sections Wright created for the floor plan. Wright designed furniture such as cubical plywood lamps and hexagonal tables for the house.

==== First floor ====
The first floor contains approximately 1,160 square feet (108 m^{2}) or 1,360 square feet (126 m^{2}) of space. The front entrance is accessed via the tunnel through the berm. The tunnel emerges onto the terrace adjacent to the house's southern facade, where a glass door leads into the house itself; there is a closet near the southern end of the tunnel. At the rear is a round stone tower, which contains a staircase to the second story on its southern wall. The base of the tower also includes a windowless root cellar or mudroom, which Jacobs had added to the design without Wright's knowledge. The root cellar connects with the house's access tunnel.

The rest of the first floor is one large space measuring 80 feet (24 m) long. It is generally 17 feet (5.2 m) wide, except where the house's stone staircase tower protrudes into the space. There is a combined living–dining room measuring 54 feet (16 m) long to the west of the stone tower. Because the second floor does not occupy the entire house, part of the living–dining room has a double-height ceiling. The room's rear wall has a circular stone fireplace, which has a 5-by-6-foot-wide (1.5 by 1.8 m) opening connecting with a slanting flue. The stair tower is surrounded by a passageway measuring 10 feet (3.0 m) wide. A kitchen, measuring 14 feet (4.3 m) long, is located to the east of the tower, with a small air shaft extending to the second floor. The design of the first floor prompted Wright to write, "Here in one room is the whole affair of good living – the warmth and invitation of a true home."

The concrete floor slab measures 3.5 inches (89 mm) thick and is underlaid by a layer of gravel measuring 8 inches (200 mm) thick. The house's stone walls were not built on the concrete floor, as was common in other Wright houses, because the walls were too heavy. Rather, the walls are supported by footers measuring 5 feet (1.5 m) deep and filled with crushed stone. From the outset, there was an underfloor heating system embedded under the first-floor slab, though it did not function properly until the floor was rebuilt in the 1980s. The original floor was coated with red wax, whereas the replacement floor has red dye embedded into the concrete.

==== Second floor ====
The second floor is approximately 1,000 square feet (93 m^{2}) or 1,050 square feet (98 m^{2}). It is designed as a balcony, suspended from the main room's ceiling via metal beams hung from the rafters. Each rafter is composed of 2-by-6-inch (51 by 152 mm) boards and is reinforced by 1-by-12-inch (25 by 305 mm) boards at either end. The rafters are tied together with crossbeams, and in the original design, the central three bedrooms are supported by only seven beams. On the balcony itself, there is a glass parapet along the south perimeter, which is 3 feet (0.91 m) tall and recessed 3.5 feet (1.1 m) from the glass facade. The northern wall is illuminated by a row of windows measuring 2 feet (0.61 m) tall, which flank the stair tower. Unlike the first floor, the second story was not built with an underfloor heating system.

The second floor was originally partitioned into four or five bedrooms. The partitions between the rooms were made of overlapping 1-by-12-inch boards that were screwed together. The partitions are slanted, creating empty triangular openings between the bedrooms, and the rooms themselves had curtains instead of doors. The westernmost bedroom also has a double-height window that is shared with the living room under it. The center bedrooms were between 13 and 15 feet (4.0 and 4.6 m) wide, while the bedrooms at either end spanned the house's entire 17-foot width; all the bedrooms opened onto a central hallway. When Bill Taylor renovated the house, the four bedrooms were reconfigured into three. These modifications included removing a wall to connect one bedroom directly with the adjacent hallway (thereby illuminating that room on two sides), as well as enlarging the remaining bedrooms.

There is a bathroom within the stair tower at the second story. The original plans called for an ornate skylight above the bathroom, but that was replaced with a simpler design before the house was finished. The stair tower's second floor also includes a closet for the master bedroom, which is reached by a wooden door. The closet was originally part of the bathroom, but Herb Jacobs subdivided the bathroom because he thought that room was too large.

== Impact and legacy ==
When the house was built in 1951, Architectural Forum magazine wrote that "the effect of the whole house is unitary", creating a warm and inviting feeling. When it was renovated in 1983, a Wisconsin State Journal reporter wrote that the house "is almost the opposite of a landmark" because it was nearly completely integrated with the adjacent hillside. Robert McCarter wrote in 1996 that "this is both one of Wright's simplest and yet most moving designs", while one of Wright's biographers, Meryle Secrest, said that the design was "proof of the way his imagination soared when stimulated by the requirements of a demanding but beautiful site". A writer for National Forum magazine wrote that the house was one of several Wright works that exemplified the "intensely practical and psychological benefits" of organic architecture.

Wright went on to design other houses with circular design motifs, including in Florida, Maryland, Michigan, and Virginia. The design of the unbuilt E. L. Marting House near Akron, Ohio, was nearly identical to that of the Jacobs Second House, albeit with a mirrored floor plan and another room instead of a root cellar. Wright also offered the plans to Donald Grover in 1950, but Grover also did not carry them out. He ultimately built several hemicycle houses—including the 1948 Meyer House in Michigan, the 1949 Laurent House in Illinois, and the 1950 Pearce House in California—but none of these was oriented to catch sunlight. The house's design inspired similar houses by other architects in Nemahbin, Wisconsin; Amherst, Massachusetts; and Saint Paul, Minnesota, as well as Ken Shuttleworth's personal residence in Wiltshire, England. In addition, Rosalie Tonkens, who had developed the Tonkens House in Amberley, Ohio, claimed that she and her husband had been inspired to hire Wright after seeing an image of the Jacobs Second House.

In 1953, the Jacobs Second House was featured in an exhibit at New York's Museum of Modern Art, which identified the building as one of "the most significant examples of modern architecture built in this country since 1945". Herbert Jacobs published a book about his relocation to the countryside in 1948, and he and his wife wrote a book about their two houses, Frank Lloyd Wright: An Illustrated Memoir, which was published in 1978. In addition, the house is depicted on the cover of Diane Maddex's 2001 book Frank Lloyd Wright's House Beautiful. The Jacobs Second House was added to the National Register of Historic Places (NRHP) on December 31, 1974, though this listing was not recorded until the next year. The house was re-added to the NRHP as a National Historic Landmark in 2003, and a plaque commemorating this designation was installed in 2005.

== See also ==
- List of Frank Lloyd Wright works
- National Register of Historic Places listings in Madison, Wisconsin
- List of National Historic Landmarks in Wisconsin
