= Herbert and Katherine Jacobs First House =

House in Madison, Wisconsin

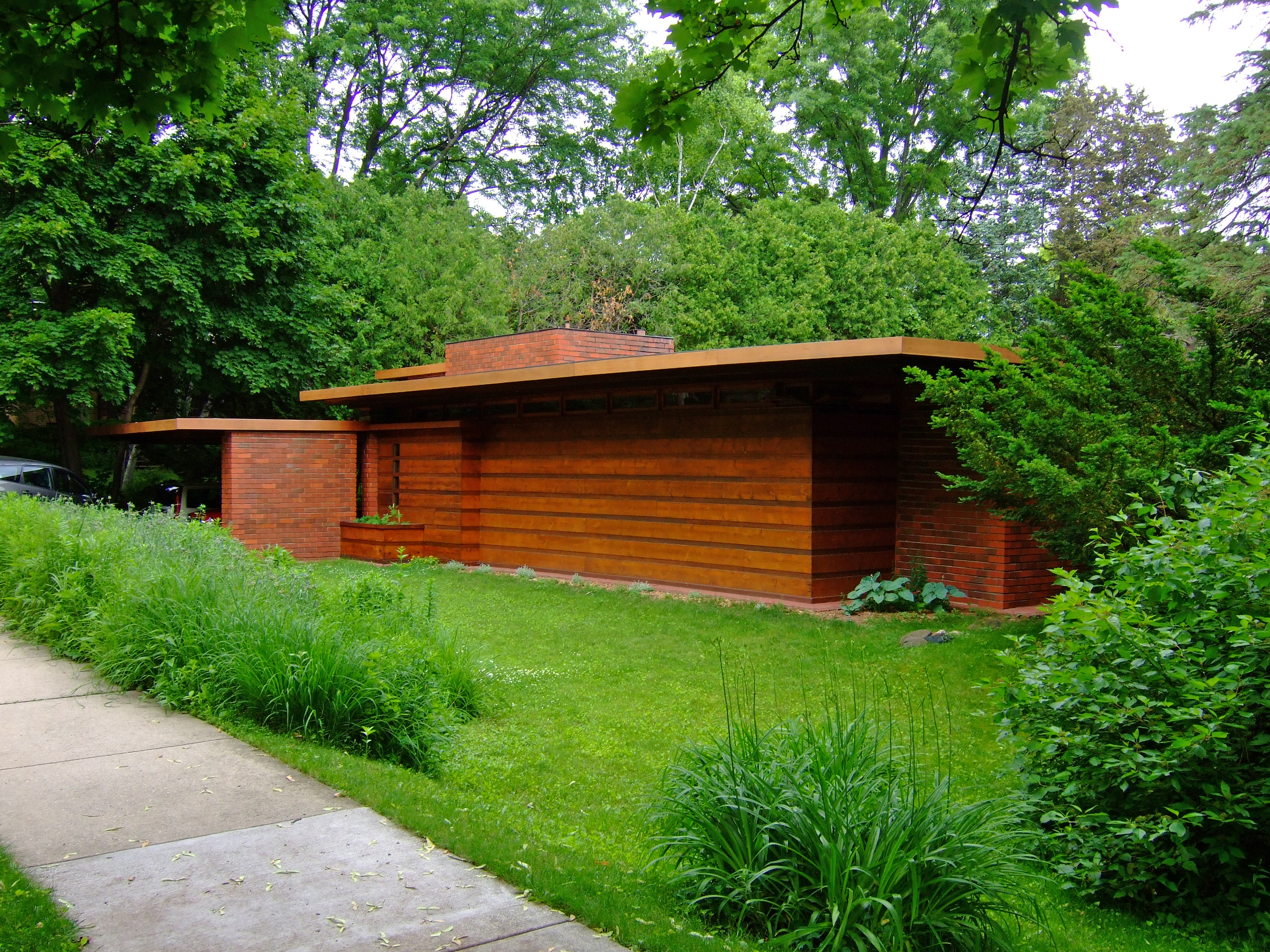
- The Jacobs First House seen from the street in June 2009

- Location within Wisconsin Location within the United States
- Interactive map showing Jacobs First House
- 43°03′31″N 89°26′30″W
- Location: 441 Toepfer Avenue; Madison, Wisconsin, United States

History
- Built: 1937

Site notes
- Architect: Frank Lloyd Wright
- Architectural styles: Modern Movement, Other
- Governing body: Private

UNESCO World Heritage Site
- Criteria: Cultural: (ii)
- Designated: 2019 (43rd session)
- Part of: The 20th-Century Architecture of Frank Lloyd Wright
- Reference no.: 1496-006
- Region: Europe and North America

U.S. National Register of Historic Places
- Designated: July 24, 1974
- Reference no.: 74000073

U.S. National Historic Landmark
- Designated: July 31, 2003

The Herbert and Katherine Jacobs First House, commonly referred to as Jacobs I, is a single-family home at 441 Toepfer Avenue in Madison, Wisconsin, United States. Designed by the architect Frank Lloyd Wright for the family of the journalist Herbert Jacobs, it was completed in 1937 and is sometimes cited as Wright's first Usonian-style house. The house is a single-story, L-shaped structure covering 1,550 square feet (144 m^{2}). It sits on a slope that descends toward Lake Wingra to the southeast.

The Jacobs First House was one of three major buildings that Wright designed in the 1930s, along with the Johnson Wax Building and Fallingwater. Prior to the Jacobs House's construction, most of Wright's clients had been wealthy; in contrast, Jacobs was a young newspaperman who worked for the Capital Times and earned no more than $35 a week. (Note: About $812 in 2025) In August 1936, Jacobs asked Wright to design a house costing no more than $5,000; (Note: About $116,000 in 2025) the architect devised the initial plans within two months. The structure ultimately cost $5,500 including land, (Note: About $123,000 in 2025) and it became so popular that the Jacobses charged visitors admission. The Jacobses lived in the house only until 1942, when they moved to a farm in Madison, where they built a second house also designed by Wright. The original house was then resold several times. The art historian James Dennis renovated the building after acquiring it in 1982; he continues to own the house as of 2026.

The Jacobs House is divided into two wings, which run near the western and northern boundaries of the site. The facade includes a wall of bricks, boards, and battens facing the street, alongside large windows and glass doors facing a rear garden. The house has a concrete pad foundation, with a radiant heating system embedded into the floor, and is covered by three levels of flat roofs with protruding eaves. There is a brick chimney mass at the corner of the L, as well as a carport to the north, which contains the house's main entrance. The western wing includes the living room and a dining niche, with a bathroom and combined workspace–kitchen inside the chimney core. In the northern wing are three bedrooms (one of which is labeled as a study) and a square room.

When the house was finished, there was mixed commentary on its materials, proportions, and relationship to the surrounding landscape, though later commentators perceived the house more positively. The popularity of the Jacobs House prompted people from across the U.S. to ask Wright to design their houses, and Wright devoted his later career to Usonian designs. Several of its architectural features were later widely used, including its board-and-batten walls, radiant heating system, and modular floor grid. Over the years, the house has been detailed in several books and depicted in many photography exhibits. The Jacobs First House was listed on the National Register of Historic Places in 1974 and designated as a National Historic Landmark in 2003. It was designated as part of The 20th-Century Architecture of Frank Lloyd Wright, a World Heritage Site, in 2019.

== Site ==
The Jacobs House is located at 441 Toepfer Avenue in Madison, Wisconsin, United States, about 3 miles (4.8 km) southwest of the Wisconsin State Capitol. The property consists of two land lots on the east side of Toepfer Avenue, measuring 120 by 126 feet (37 by 38 m) in total. The site is part of Westmorland, a subdivision of Dane County, Wisconsin, that was once politically separate from Madison. The southeast corner of the property slopes down slightly toward Lake Wingra several blocks away; the house itself sits atop a ridge that runs northwest–southwest through the area. The L-shaped building rests on a platform overlooking the slope. The platform occupies the site's northwest corner, with one wing set back 30 feet (9.1 m) from the western boundary and the other wing set back approximately 6 feet (1.8 m) from the northern boundary. When the family of the journalist Herbert Jacobs acquired the site, it was undeveloped.

The floor plan faces away from the street, partially surrounding a rear garden, which is geographically at the center of the site. The house's positioning maximized the size of the garden while also reducing the cost of the driveway from the street. The layout also enabled Frank Lloyd Wright to treat the outdoor garden as an interior space. Wright had suggested flattening the land southeast of the house's platform and constructing the garden about 3 feet (0.91 m) below the house, but this idea was not carried out. The original plans had called for a row of trees on one side of the garden, as well as a section set aside for vegetable planting.

== History ==
Frank Lloyd Wright mostly designed houses for wealthy clients until the 1930s, when he also began to design lower-cost Usonian houses for middle-class families. In general, his Usonian houses tended to have open plans, geometric floor grids, in-floor heating, and a carport, and they lacked a garage or basement; they also tended to be arranged in the shape of an "L" or a "T". For two decades, Wright had experimented with ideas for less expensive homes, such as the 1934 Willey House in Minneapolis. Initially, Wright designed his lowest-priced houses primarily for his friends and family. Over his lifetime, he designed more than 300 Usonian houses, including 140 that were ultimately constructed.

=== Development ===
==== Commission ====
The Jacobs First House was one of three major buildings that Wright designed in the 1930s; the others were the Johnson Wax Building in Racine, Wisconsin, and Fallingwater in Stewart Township, Pennsylvania. The house was built for the family of Herbert Jacobs, who had recently come to work for Madison's Capital Times after working for the Milwaukee Journal. Herb was a Harvard University–educated journalist, while his new wife Katherine Wescott was a recent graduate of Ripon College. At the time, they were living at 1143 Sherman Avenue. The couple wanted to develop a residence where they could live with their newborn daughter, and they initially wanted a traditional Dutch Colonial Revival house. The family could not afford a grand house; they had a budget of $5,000–5,500. (Note: About $116,000–128,000 in 2025) (Note: Some sources, including the Jacobses themselves, give a figure of $5,000. Others cite a slightly higher figure of $5,500.) and typical houses of the era were three times as expensive.

By the time Herb decided to build the house, his weekly salary was no more than $35, (Note: Herbert recalled in a 1978 memoir that he was earning $20 weekly.) and the family had $1,600 in savings. (Note: About $37,000 in 2025) The Jacobses first heard of Wright's work through Katherine's cousin Harold Wescott, who had studied at Wright's architectural studio, Taliesin, for one summer. They were initially reluctant to hire Wright, perceiving him as an "architect for millionaires", even though he was only just starting to receive major jobs after several years of underemployment. After further encouragement from Katherine's cousin, the couple agreed to meet Wright at Taliesin; Katherine had reportedly been enticed by Wright's preference for open plan layouts.

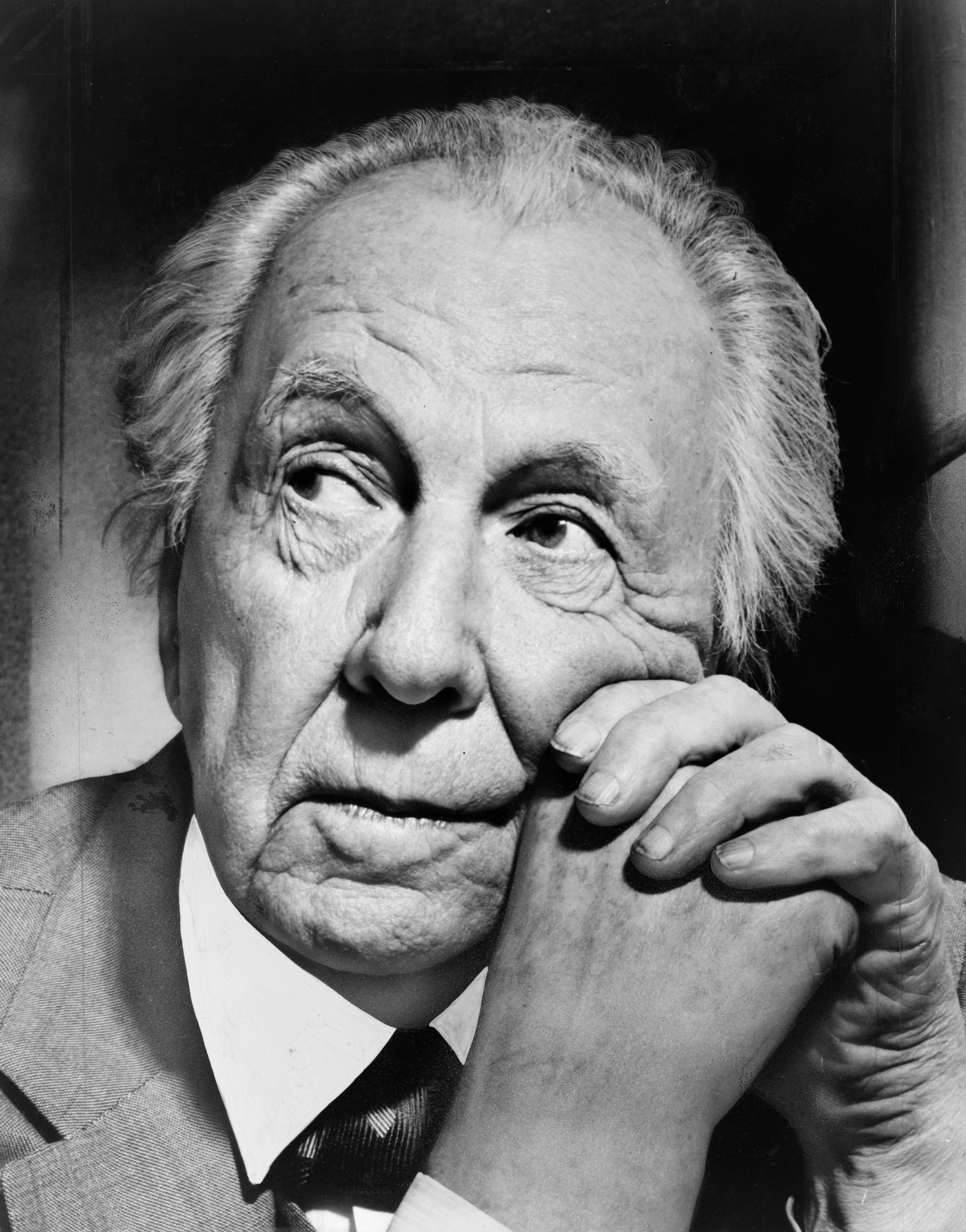
In 1936, the Jacobses drove to see Frank Lloyd Wright (pictured), asking him to design their house.

In August 1936, the Jacobses drove 50 miles (80 km) to see Wright at Taliesin. Upon meeting the architect, Herb reportedly told Wright, "What this country needs is a decent five-thousand-dollar house", asking if Wright could design a $5,000 house for them. Wright warned Herb and Katherine that they might not be satisfied with a $5,000 design because "most people want a ten-thousand-dollar house for five thousand dollars", but the Jacobses insisted that they still wanted him to construct a house for that price. Factoring in Wright's 10% commission, this meant that the house itself could be built for no more than $4,500 including land. (Note: About $104,000 in 2025) At the time, Wright had just finished designing Fallingwater and the Hanna–Honeycomb House, both of which had cost tens of thousands of dollars apiece.

==== Design and site acquisition ====
The author Brendan Gill described the Jacobses as being "in a state of highly disadvantaged innocence" about the house's construction cost. For example, they initially thought that the $5,000 price included the land acquisition cost and that the house could be completed in three months. When Herb found that the price did not include land costs, he wrote to Wright, requesting that the house be downsized from three to two bedrooms. Wright also claimed that he could not begin designing the house unless a site was selected. The Taliesin team could not select a site themselves, as they were busy with other projects. Ultimately, the family had acquired a site in Westmorland. The site, on the west side of Toepfer Avenue, measured 60 by 120 feet (18 by 37 m) and cost $800, exactly half of what the Jacobses had available. Herb wanted the rooms to be tall enough to accommodate his 6-foot-1-inch (1.85 m) stature, joking that he should be able to walk freely around the house without taking off his hat. The couple also requested large amounts of closet space, and they submitted long lists of demands that Wright largely ignored.

Within two months of being hired, Wright had drawn up plans for the Jacobs House, reusing an unbuilt plan that he had drawn up for the Hoult family during 1935 or 1936. Wright designed an L-shaped structure with approximately 1,500 square feet (140 m^{2}), consisting of an open plan living space and three bedrooms. He suggested that the Jacobses install a radiant heating system, a highly experimental technology at the time, as well as a flat roof and thin triple-layered sandwich walls. The design spanned the entire width of the 60-foot lot, which meant that there would be no setback from the surrounding lots. The family thus decided to obtain a larger site, possibly at Wright's suggestion. The Jacobses traded their original site for a 120-by-126-foot (37 by 38 m) site across the street at 441 Toepfer Avenue, using up all of their remaining savings. The family used only the northern portion of the two lots, giving them the option to sell off the southernmost 55 feet (17 m) of the site, adjoining a street corner. The land swap also affected how much sunlight the house would receive, since the orientation of the house was also rotated. (Note: From the outset, the rear elevation of the house had been designed with glass walls. At the original site, the rear elevation would have faced west toward an uphill slope, which meant that it would have received high amounts of sunlight during the afternoon. At the new site, the rear elevation faces east toward a downhill slope, and it would receive the most sunlight at sunrise instead of in the afternoon.)

==== Construction ====
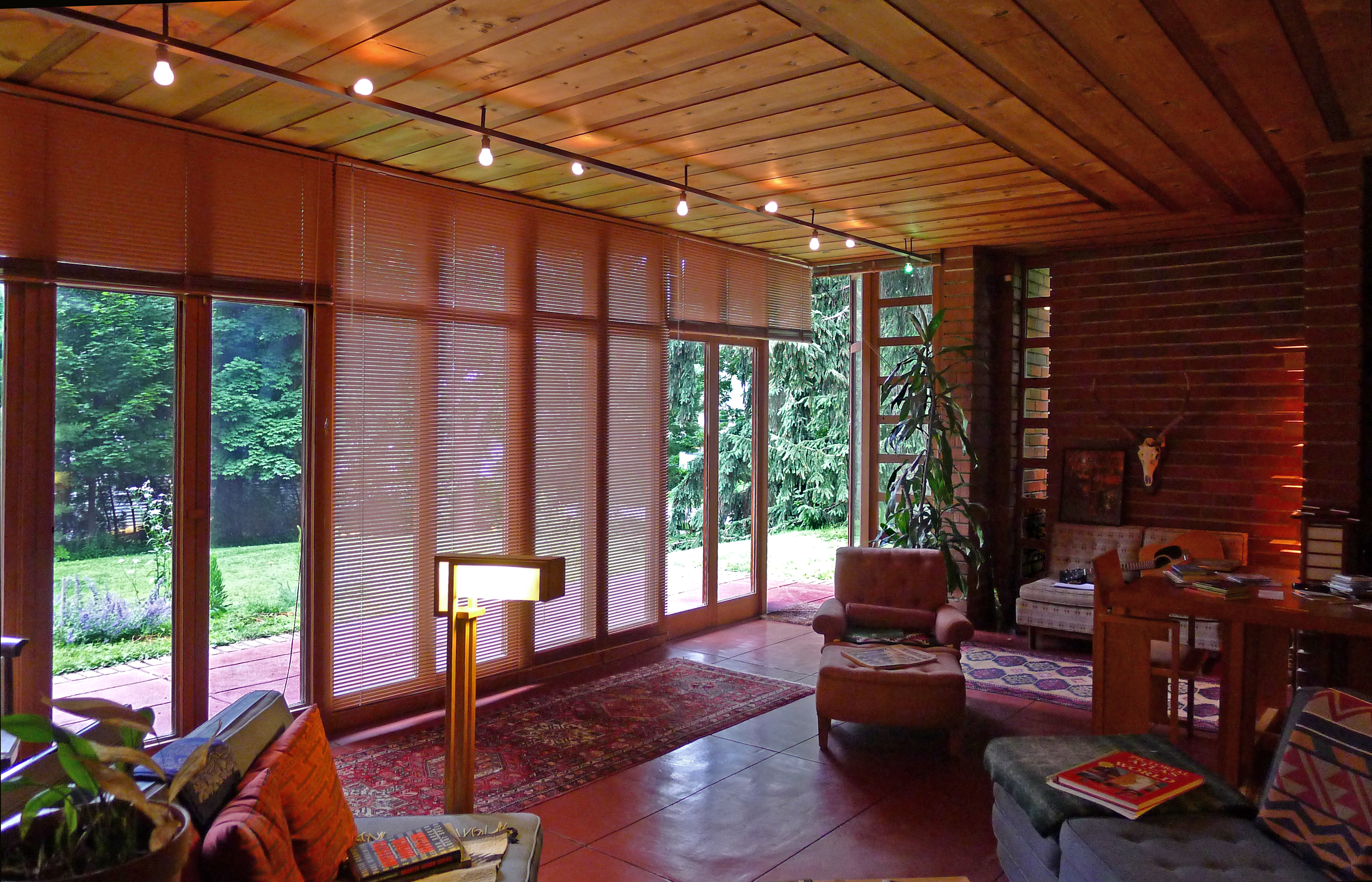
The living room, facing the rear garden

To finance the house's construction, the Jacobses applied to the Federal Housing Administration (FHA) for a loan. The FHA rejected the Jacobses' request for a mortgage loan because regulations prevented flat-roofed structures from obtaining FHA loans. Ultimately, the couple was able to obtain a $4,500 mortgage from a banker who was also a fan of Wright's architecture. The Jacobses received the drawings for the house on November 15, 1936. The family hired P. Bert Grove as the general contractor, having briefly considered purchasing a site from him. Grove subcontracted much of the work to other firms, since he had no dedicated construction crew. The house's development briefly stalled in late 1936 after Wright caught pneumonia, rendering him unable to address any issues that arose. To save money, Wright did not require Grove to adhere to a specific timeline; as a result, Grove and his subcontractors prioritized other projects, constructing the Jacobs House during their spare time.

The official groundbreaking took place on June 2, 1937. The cellar and concrete foundation were poured within a month of groundbreaking, and the heating pipes were then embedded into the foundation. During the house's construction, the Jacobs family often sought ways to save money. For example, to save $35, (Note: About $812 in 2025) they asked Wright to shorten one eave by 2 feet (0.61 m). The Jacobses also obtained windows from department-store buildings so they only needed to pay for the window frames, and Herb salvaged gold leaf from store signage. The builders used prefabricated wall sections (which were joined at their corners), and two of Katherine's cousins were hired to create the furniture. Herb personally helped with some aspects of the construction, installing the soffits underneath the eaves, as well as the ceiling panels. Herb remained worried about not having enough money, especially because of increasing supply costs.

Wright made some changes to the design during construction, reducing the height of the roof above the bathroom and adjusting the window designs. At one point, Wright asked Grove to lengthen one of the eaves; when Grove complained about cost increases, Wright directed the contractor to reduce the height of the brick wall under it. In addition, Wright's original design did not adequately support the dining alcove's window, forcing Jacobs and some Taliesin apprentices to add brick piers for reinforcement. Herb also recalled that the middle layers of the wooden sandwich walls kept falling down.

By August 1937, the concrete pad above the heating system had been built, and workers were constructing the masonry walls. According to Herb, passersby often came to look at the house during construction, and most visitors were friendly. One such visitor was the architect Walter Gropius, who at the time was a lecturer at the University of Wisconsin–Madison; Wright reportedly refused to give Gropius a tour because a local architect had invited Gropius to the house without Wright's permission. The Jacobses themselves went to Pennsylvania in August 1937 to see Fallingwater, whose owner Edgar J. Kaufmann invited them to tour that house and later gifted the Jacobses bronze lamp pedestals. Herb wrote that their visit to Fallingwater had solidified their opinion "that we had been fortunate to pick Wright as architect". The Jacobses and Wright remained friends for decades after the house was completed.

=== Jacobs use ===
==== Moving in and completion ====
In late 1937, Grove casually remarked to Herb that the contractors would continue working on final touches through that winter. This prompted Herb to contemplate moving into the house before it was finished; according to Herb, the family was able to move all of their belongings in a single van. The Jacobses moved in on November 27, 1937; the house was still incomplete, and work continued for more than a month. Herb wrote that the carpenters were only motivated to complete the remaining work after Christmas, when the carpenters learned that they would not be further compensated for prolonging the work. The family ultimately spent $5,500; the cost had increased by $500 (Note: About $11,000 in 2025) because the Jacobses had asked Wright to design another bedroom. The house itself had cost $5,000 to build, (Note: About $112,000 in 2025) while Wright had charged an architect's fee of $450 (Note: About $10,000 in 2025) or $500. The family had little money left over for high-quality furnishings, so Wright's Taliesin Fellowship gave the family a cast-iron bowl that had originally been intended for Herbert Fisk Johnson Jr.'s Wingspread mansion in Wind Point.

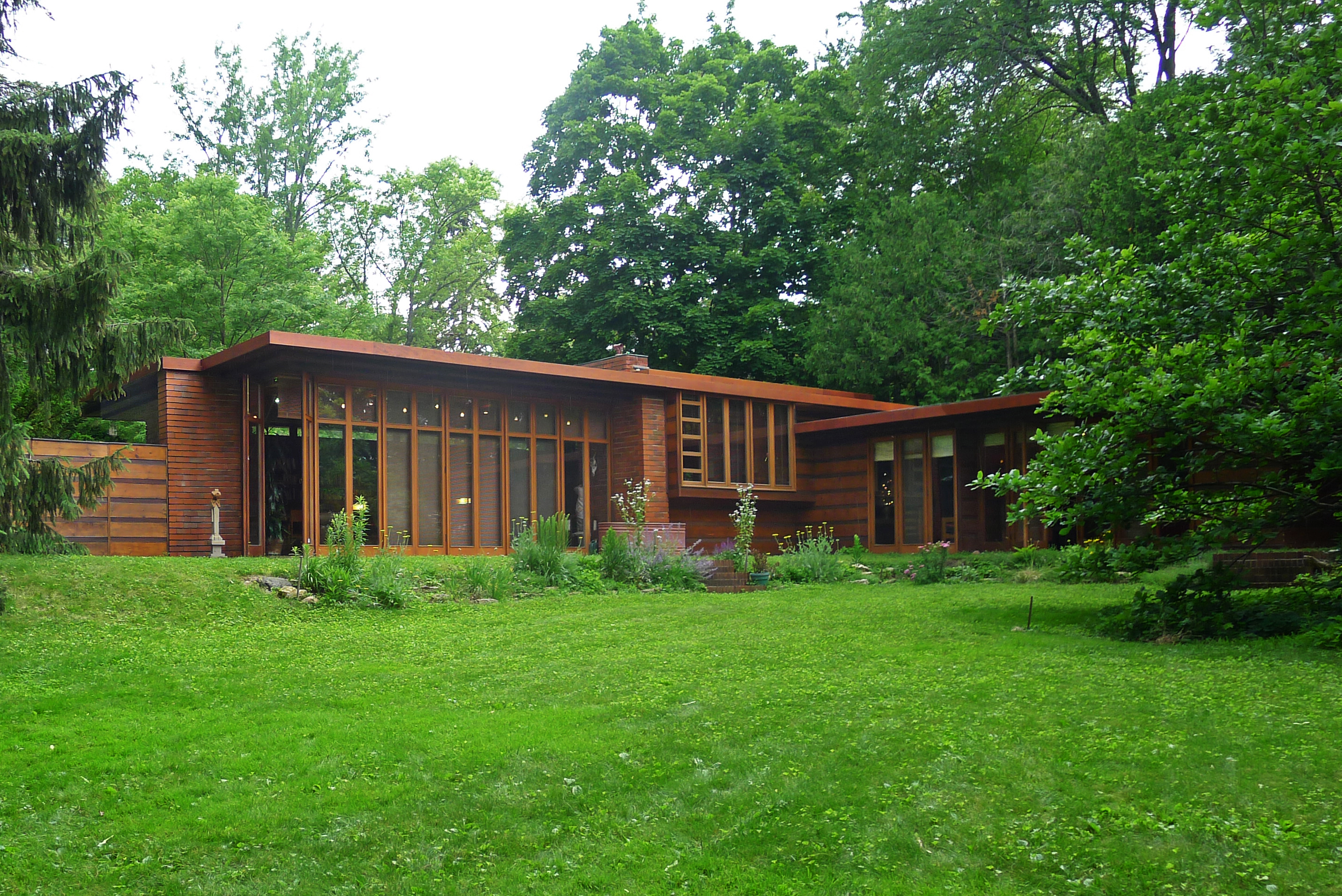
Rear facade, seen in June 2015

The design prompted high amounts of interest from the general public, particularly because it was relatively inexpensive and had several unconventional design features. The Kansas City Star wrote that Herb Jacobs was primarily known for his house in the years after it was completed. The Wisconsin State Journal, a competitor to Jacobs's employer the Capital Times, published a front-page story about the house's design as it was being completed. There was so much interest in the house that the Jacobses began charging each tourist 25 cents. The family later doubled this charge to 50 cents, which Herb said was to discourage local women's groups from entertaining people at the house during the weekend. They eventually collected enough money from admission to pay for Wright's design fee.

Wright's apprentice Edgar Tafel stated that Wright frequently dropped by the Jacobs House unannounced, while Herb said that Wright often banged on the windows because "he liked Katherine's biscuits". Other notable visitors included the theater critic Alexander Woollcott (whom Wright once brought as a guest) and the physicist Niels Bohr; the Taliesin Fellowship also held some parties in the house. The photographer Pedro E. Guerrero took several images of the house, which was the first of many Wright-designed residences that he photographed over the years. The family also sent out Christmas postcards depicting their house. In speeches to women's groups, Katherine praised the house's room designs, materials, and heating system, saying it was easy to keep clean.

==== Subsequent changes ====
The house had some design issues, in part because some of the Usonian design features had not been used previously. For example, the radiant heating pipes used steam and did not provide sufficient heat during the cold weather, so the pipes were converted to use hot water instead. The house lacked window screens to block out solar heat during the summer, and the family could not afford multi-paned storm windows to protect against the cold winters. Wright claimed to have "forgotten" to design screens for the house, but he eventually agreed to install them at the Jacobses' request, the $125 cost being paid from his architectural fee. (Note: About $2,799 in 2025) The screens were installed in April 1938. One of the living room's brick piers had begun to tilt because the Jacobses had failed to construct a soil-filled terrace, as had been detailed in Wright's plans. As a result, a Taliesin apprentice reinforced the pier, and Herb built out the terrace. The family also paid $500 for the installation of ceiling boards, which raised the final cost to $6,000. (Note: About $134,000 in 2025)

In their first full year there, the Jacobses planted a 20-by-80-foot (6.1 by 24.4 m) garden outside the house, which helped reduce weekly grocery expenses from $7 to $4. (Note: From about $157 to $90 in 2025) The family also planted shrubs around the house, which grew significantly within two years. Herb wrote that "we did not feel deprived" in the house, even though the family had such meager savings that they had to sell their car to pay for their second child's birth. At the time, Herb was earning $42 a week and was spending very little. (Note: About $941 in 2025) The family also hosted events there such as movie screenings. A reporter for The Wall Street Journal wrote that the Jacobses had appreciated "the beauty and convenience" of the house, which they considered to be simple yet luxurious.

In 1942, the Jacobses moved to a farmhouse on a hill near Middleton, Wisconsin, about 6 miles (9.7 km) away from the first house. In spite of Wright's efforts to convince them to keep the first house, the family felt that the area surrounding their first house was becoming too densely built-up. According to Herb, he and his wife had decided to move after contemplating the matter for only a short period; Herb had written about his intention to sell the first house on September 6, and they moved to Middleton on November 13. The family left the house's built-in furniture in place, buying an old truck to carry their remaining possessions to Middleton. Shortly afterward, they commissioned Wright to build the Herbert and Katherine Jacobs Second House, a "solar hemicycle"–style structure, on that site. The family moved to the second house in 1948 and lived there until Herb's retirement in 1962, when they moved to the San Francisco Bay Area.

=== Later ownership ===
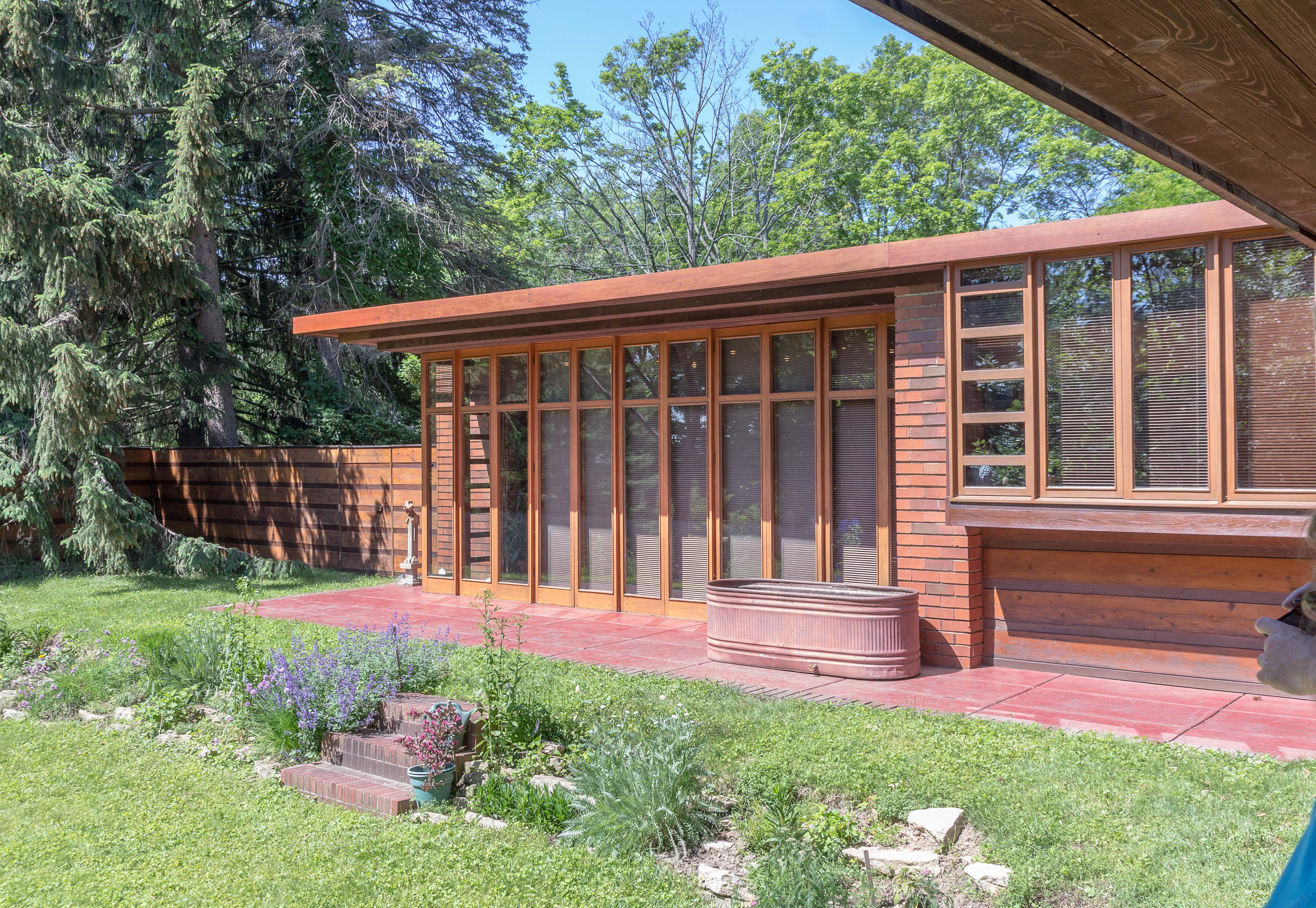
The eastern elevation of the west (living room) wing, with plate-glass windows and doors facing the garden

Max W. Pohle, a dentist, acquired the property by the late 1940s. Pohle lived there until his death in 1953 and bequeathed his estate to his wife Ruth, with whom he jointly owned the Toepfer Avenue house, and his three sisters. Leonard E. Sweet was recorded as living in the house by the late 1950s. The house was also included in walking tours of historic Madison buildings. By the 1970s, the lawyer Jerome S. Schmidt and his wife Lynn lived in the house; the family of Thomas Harnley was recorded as the house's owner by 1974. The house's valuation had increased to approximately $57,300 (Note: About $503,100 in 2025) by 1979.

Over the years, the house deteriorated due to neglect. James Dennis, an art historian who taught at the University of Wisconsin–Madison, became interested in the house in the 1970s after hearing Herb Jacobs talk about it. According to Dennis, the house's roofs were sagging under the weight of their asphalt surfaces, the floor slab was covered with a carpet, and the original dining-room window had been replaced. There were also leaking windows and buckling floor slabs, and the carport was in such poor condition that it had to be torn down. One of the subsequent owners had coated the wooden facades in creosote, turning it black; a reporter for The Capital Times wrote that the house had been repainted in the 1970s.

==== Dennis ownership ====
James Dennis bought the house in 1982 for around $100,000. (Note: About $334,000 in 2025) He partly financed his purchase by selling some paintings and prints that he owned, since there was not enough space in the house to store these objects, and he restored the house to its original appearance. The Wisconsin architect John Eifler designed the renovation, (Note: Eifler's name is spelled "Eiffler" in the National Register of Historic Places database.) while Bradley Lynch oversaw the renovation and was its construction manager. During the restoration, workers obtained the house's original architectural drawings from the Taliesin West archives. The project included restoring the facade, reinforcing a sagging bay window, inserting steel beams in the roof, and removing a wall south of the living room. Workers also replaced the heating system, replaced the appliances in the kitchen, and cleaned the wooden walls, and they added extra wiring, new windows, and new bookshelves. Some of Dennis's students and friends helped with the renovation, as did James's sons David and John. Suppliers also donated materials for the renovation, and visitors such as the architect Marshall Erdman and the Jacobses themselves stopped by the house during the project.

Dennis claimed to have spent as much money on the restoration as he did on the house, the mortgage, and the interest on the mortgage. As a result, he went into debt while restoring the building. The renovation ultimately took five years, and the Dennis family was not able to move in until 1985. James and his wife Laurel slept in one of the bedrooms, using the other two bedrooms as studies. After the renovation was complete, the local organization Capital Community Citizens gave James Dennis and Nancy Kendrick an award for their work preserving the house in 1989, praising Dennis for having faithfully restored the original architecture despite the high costs of the restoration. The American Institute of Architects gave Eifler & Associates a restoration award, and Dennis and Kendrick also received a Madison Trust Preservation Award. Dennis attempted to recover some of the house's original furniture from a Chicago gallery, suing when his efforts proved unsuccessful. In the long run, he also wanted to carry out Wright's original plan for the garden.

The house continued to attract visitors; the Madison Art Center hosted an art exhibition at the house in mid-1991, and Dennis sometimes gave tours of the residence to foreign visitors and passersby. James Dennis recalled that he had to frequently perform maintenance on the windows and the facade, comparing it to the maintenance of a boat. In a 2003 interview, he said that the house always had a "calming effect" on him whenever he came home from work, in part because of its dimensions and materials. The house was valued at $280,200 by 2015, and James Dennis remains the owner of the house as of 2026. While the property remained closed to the public in the 21st century, it has been included in guided tours such as the Wright and Like tour and the Madison Historic Neighborhoods Tour.

== Architecture ==
Floor plan of the Jacobs First House

The Jacobs First House is sometimes cited as Wright's first Usonian-style house, and it has been known as "Jacobs I" or "Usonia No. 1". Although the Usonia No. 1 name is sometimes attributed to Wright, the architect also claimed that his first Usonian design was the 1923 La Miniatura in Pasadena, California. Wright's designs for the Hoult family's residence in Wichita, Kansas, and the Lusk family's residence in Huron, South Dakota, are also cited as having preceded the Jacobs First House, although neither was ultimately built. The house is one of several buildings designed by Wright in Madison, along with others such as the Jacobs Second House, the Gilmore "Airplane" House, and the First Unitarian Society of Madison. By the 1980s, it was one of eight Wright-designed buildings remaining in Dane County.

The house is a single-story structure measuring 60 feet (18 m) wide and 77 feet (23 m) long. In designing the Jacobs First House, Wright simplified the four-winged cruciform layout of his earlier houses into a two-winged L, and he omitted servant's quarters, a second story, a full basement, and hip roofs. The wing on the western side of the site, which faces the street, contains the house's combined living–dining room. Another wing, running along the northern side of the site, contains the bedrooms. The bathroom and kitchen occupy a masonry-walled core at the corner connecting the two wings; the core serves as a transitional structure between the communal living–dining space and the bedrooms.

Wright experimented with several design features to reduce costs. For instance, the house uses a radiant heating system, an unenclosed carport, and flat roofs, at a time when many houses had radiators, garages, and sloped roofs with gutters. The overhanging roof eaves helped moderate the house's temperature, deflecting heat during the summer; the glass doors on the facade's eastern elevation let in sunlight during the winter, when the sun was lower in the sky. The house's triple-layered sandwich walls consist of a central layer of vertical pine boards wedged between two layers of horizontal boards, which eliminated the need for siding, wallpaper, or plaster finishes. The pine boards are affixed to battens, with a sheet of building paper between each layer of boards, which Wright claimed would eliminate fire hazards and pest infestations.

=== Exterior ===
==== Facade ====
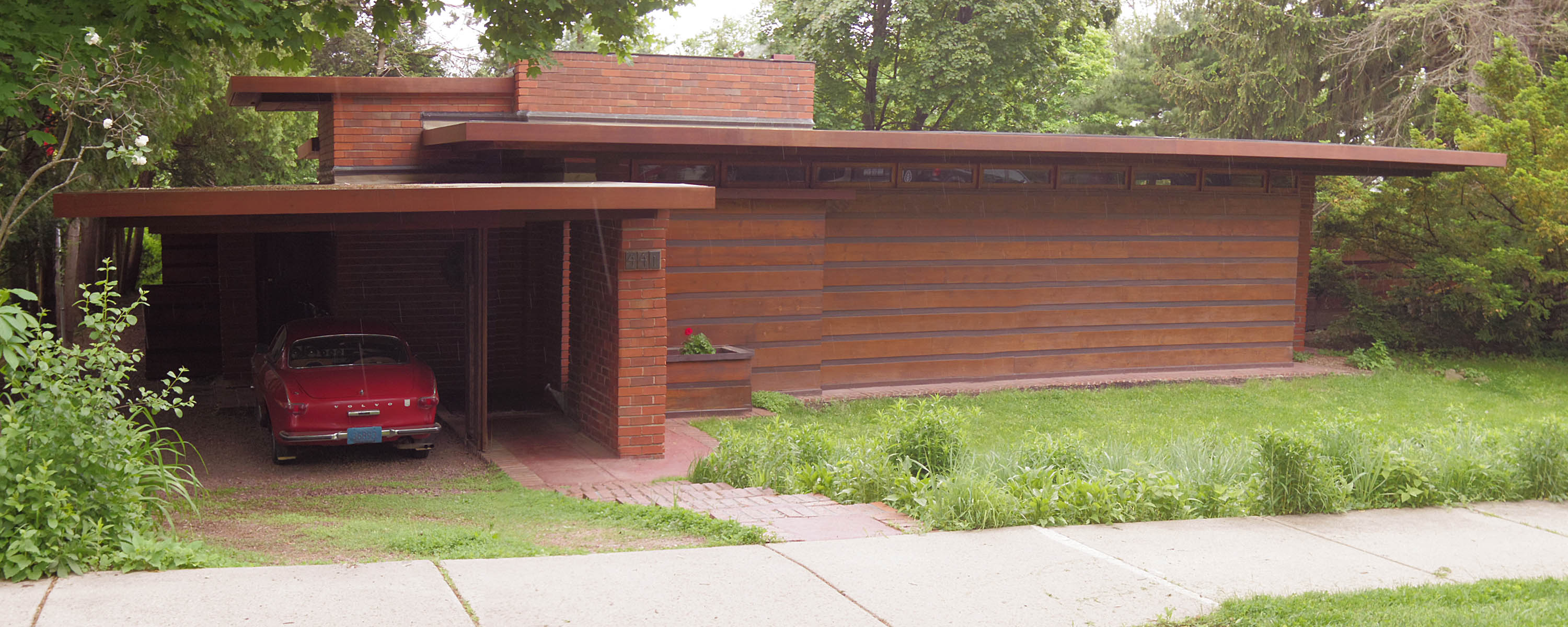
The western elevation as seen in 2017, with the carport at left

The facade is made of glass, solid brick, and wooden boards. Wright's design avoided large front windows; instead, the main (or western) elevation is a plainly designed sandwich wall. There are also wooden walls on the northern elevation, as well as the western wing's southern elevation and the northern wing's eastern elevation. The surfaces of the sandwich walls have horizontally oriented boards and are coated in linseed oil. For the most part, the only windows on the sandwich walls are just beneath the roof, where low clerestory windows illuminate the interiors. The windows measure 1 foot (0.30 m) tall and are divided vertically by mullions, spaced 2 feet (0.61 m) apart. According to the writer Robert McCarter, the dearth of windows was intended to indicate that the street side was "clearly outside the habitable realm of the house".

The house's foundation is clad in brick because Wright wanted the foundation to visually anchor the house to the ground. The northern elevation, which is also clad in brick, contains the house's main entrance. The facade's bricks are separated by joints made of mortar; the horizontal joints are deeply rusticated, while the vertical joints are flush with the rest of the facade. As a money-saving measure, the house uses leftover bricks from the Johnson Wax Building, which may account for the irregular shapes of some bricks. Instead of a fully enclosed garage, Wright designed a carport on the house's northern elevation, which is partially enclosed on two sides and is covered by a canopy. The carport canopy, an extension of the bedroom wing's roof, is cantilevered from the northern wall of the facade, overhanging the gravel driveway.

The original windows were one pane thick. In contrast to the lack of windows on the western elevation, the eastern elevation of the living room and the southern elevation of the two larger bedrooms have plate-glass doors and windows. The plate-glass facades of the living room measure 9 feet (2.7 m) tall and 28 feet (8.5 m) wide, while those of the bedrooms are 7 feet (2.1 m) tall. The windows could be opened during the summer, which, according to Herb Jacobs, created the effect that the roof was floating. There are wooden Aeroshade slats behind the windows, which could be closed off for privacy. A bay window illuminates the living room's dining niche, located on the eastern elevation of the facade. James Dennis replaced the original windows with thermal windows when he acquired the house.

==== Roofs ====
The house's roofs are staggered across three levels; the lowest roof level is above the north wing and the living room's dining alcove, while the highest roof level is above the kitchen and bathroom. (Note: Sources disagree on the roof levels' heights.: Beltrán-Fernández et al. 2017, p. 2, cites the north wing roof as 7 ft (2.1 m), the west wing roof as 9 ft (2.7 m), and the kitchen and bathroom roof as 11 ft (3.4 m).; National Park Service 2003, p. 6, cites the north wing roof as 8 ft (2.4 m), the west wing roof as 10 ft (3.0 m), and the kitchen and bathroom roof as 13 ft (4.0 m).) Clerestory windows are placed on the facade between the different roof levels. Each section of the roof is made of overlapping 2-by-4-inch (51 by 102 mm) beams, which are linked in sets of three to create slabs measuring 2 by 12 inches (51 by 305 mm). The roofs protrude from the facade on all sides, creating eaves that range in depth from 1 to 6 feet (0.30 to 1.83 m). The eaves taper in thickness from 12 inches (300 mm) at the roof to 4 inches (100 mm) at the edges. Some of the eaves serve a practical purpose, while others were added solely for esthetic purposes; Herb wrote that Wright had claimed the eaves would give the house "a feeling of shelter". The eaves, along with the sandwich walls, also visually emphasized the horizontal orientation of the facade.

=== Interior ===
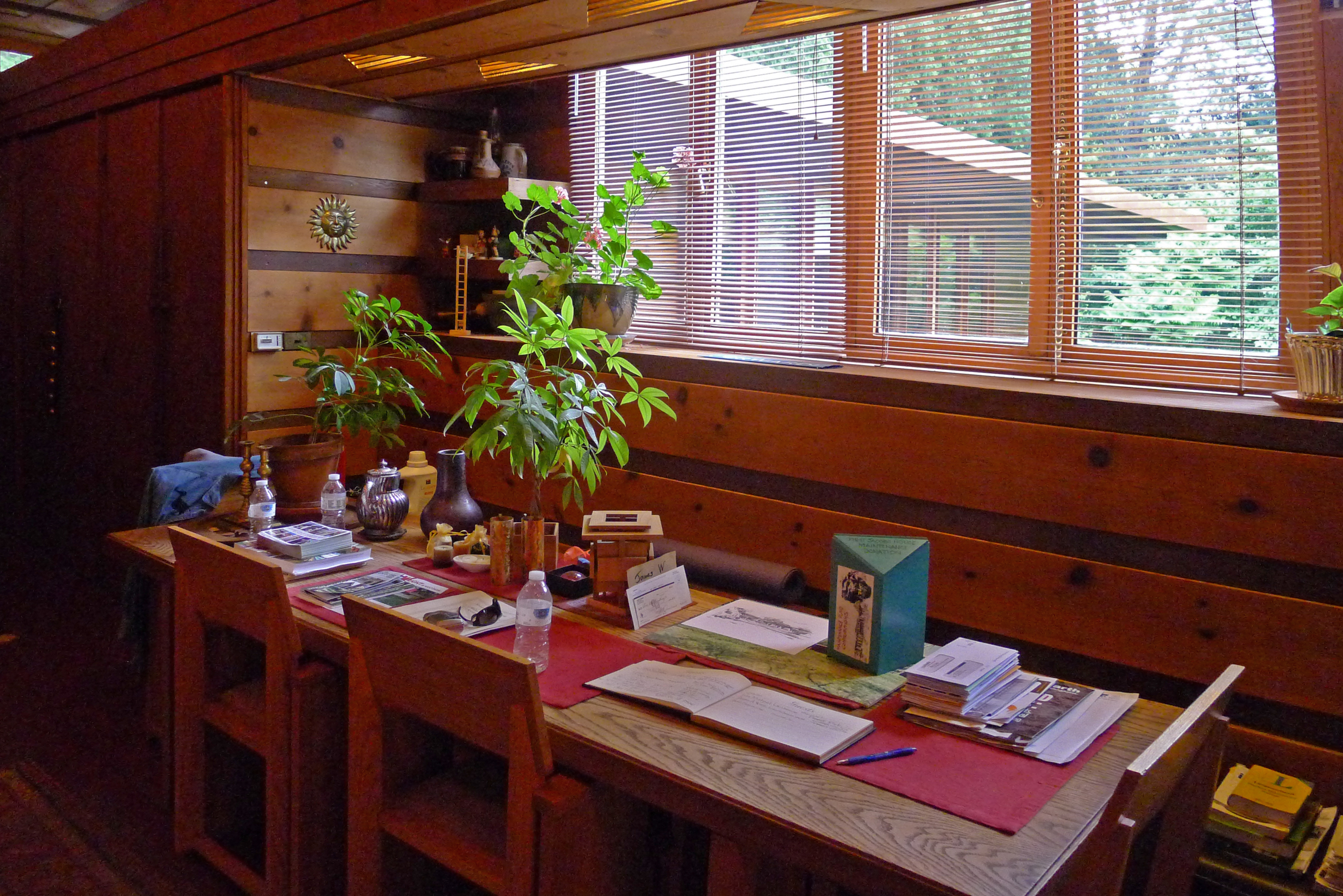
The western wing's dining niche

As built, the house has about 1,550 square feet (144 m^{2}), (Note: Several other figures have been cited: The city of Madison and the Baraboo News Republic cite a more precise figure of 1,552 square feet (144.2 m^{2}). This figure excludes the cellar, which has an area of 72 square feet (6.7 m^{2}).; Some news sources have given a rounded figure of 1,500 square feet (140 m^{2}).; Lind 1994, p. 19, gives a substantially different figure of 1,340 square feet (124 m^{2}).) with a small cellar under the kitchen. The house's floor plan is arranged around a 2-by-4-foot (0.61 by 1.22 m) grid, which is denoted by joints in the concrete floor slab. The grid is interrupted at several points; for example, some hallways and doors are 3 feet (0.91 m) wide, and the stairway to the cellar bisects some of the grid's rectangles. The positions of the walls vary between rooms, creating irregular spaces. Most of the walls are on this grid; zinc strips are fastened to the bottoms of the walls so they could be installed along the floor's joints. The sandwich wall boards divide the house vertically into modules measuring 13 inches (330 mm) high. (Note: This is the height of one board and one batten (as measured from bottom to top), though sources disagree on their dimensions.: National Park Service 2003, p. 5, says that each board is 9.5 inches (240 mm) high and that each batten is 3.25 inches (83 mm) high.; McCarter 1997, p. 254, says that each board is 12 inches (300 mm) high and that each batten is 1 inch (25 mm) high.) The positioning of shelves, lighting, windows, eaves, and chimneys is based on these vertical modules. Most of the walls are made of wood, except at the entrance and in the living room, where brick is used to indicate that these spaces are communal rooms.

The ceiling is clad with boards and recessed battens, which divide the ceiling surface into 13-inch-wide modules. The ceilings of each room vary in height to give the impression that the house is larger than it actually is. The kitchen and bathroom have the highest ceilings at 11 feet 7 inches (3.53 m); the living spaces measure 9 feet 4 inches (2.84 m) high, and the bedrooms measure 7 feet 3 inches (2.21 m) high. Wright also designed the house's built-in furniture, insisting that the Jacobses' preexisting furniture was stylistically incompatible with the rest of the design. Katherine's cousins Harold and Clarence Wescott built all of the furniture, Herb recalled that the original furniture included two large tables, a coffee table, six dining chairs, two lounge chairs, a hassock, and a table and chairs for the children.

==== Western wing ====
The western wing, which contains the communal rooms, lacks doors for the most part, since Wright had combined the living and dining areas into a single, open plan space. This gave the Jacobses a large family room without going over budget, and it also allowed Wright to omit "formal rooms" from the design. The main entrance is through the carport and leads to a passageway running along the western side of the house, just west of the kitchen. The passage is illuminated by the clerestory windows on the house's western elevation. Wright claimed that the presence of the passageway eliminated the need for the house's occupants to invite "persons with only temporary business" into the living room.

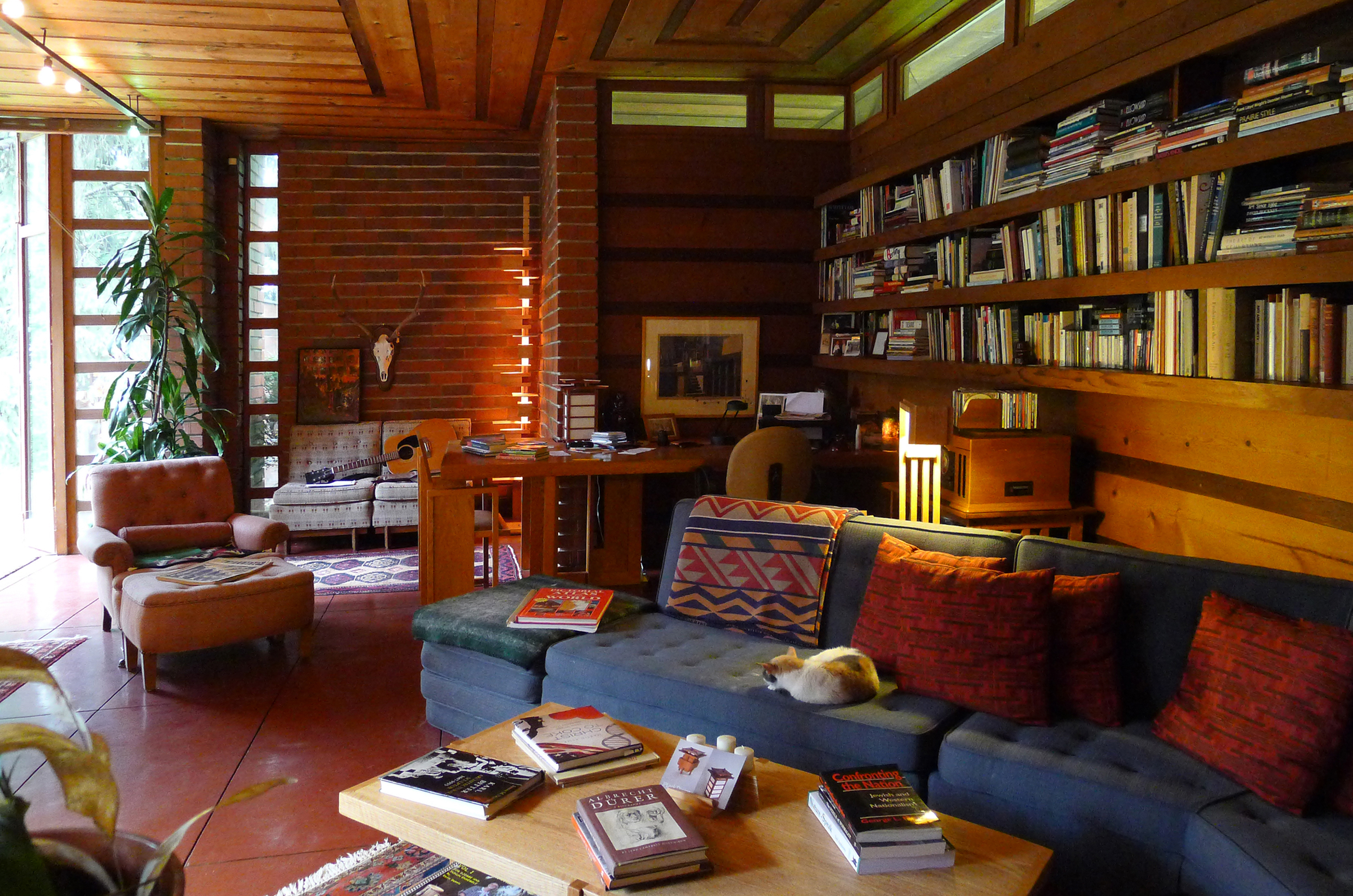
Reading nook in living room

The living room measures 29 by 18 feet (8.8 by 5.5 m), with a cutout measuring 5 by 6 feet (1.5 by 1.8 m) on one wall. There is a reading nook with a built-in writing table next to a wall of built-in bookshelves. In another corner of the living room is a dining niche measuring 4 by 12 feet (1.2 by 3.7 m); the niche partially protrudes into a hallway leading to the central kitchen and northern wing. The dining niche, located on the eastern elevation overlooking the garden, has a narrow table measuring 8 feet (2.4 m) long and a little more than 2 feet (0.61 m) wide. On the wall behind the table is built-in seating. On the eastern wall are the glass doors to the garden, while the western wall has bookshelves underneath the ceiling. The living room also has a working fireplace, which Wright described as "an integral structural feature made out of materials of the building itself".

The house's core includes the living room's north wall and fireplace, along with the kitchen and bathroom; these rooms are directly above the house's furnace and, as such, have wooden floors. A hallway leads from the living room to the kitchen, which is also known as the workspace. This room, which opens directly into the dining niche, measures 7 by 8 feet (2.1 by 2.4 m) across, although cupboards on three sides reduce the usable space to approximately 4 by 5 feet (1.2 by 1.5 m). The space is illuminated by clerestory windows at its top. The location of the kitchen allowed the house's owners to more easily entertain guests and serve food, contrasting with earlier kitchens, which were typically tucked away in corners. Herb Jacobs wrote that his wife could prepare meals for 40–50 guests in the kitchen, despite its small area.

Next to the kitchen is the bathroom, a rectangular space with a triangular tub at one corner; the tub does not have a shower head. A linen closet measuring 6 by 2 feet (1.83 by 0.61 m) across, with a phone booth, is located across the hallway from the bathroom. The cellar under the kitchen measures 8 by 16 feet (2.4 m × 4.9 m) or 6 by 17 feet (1.8 m × 5.2 m). It is accessed by a staircase situated between the kitchen and bathroom, which measures 2 feet wide.

==== Northern wing ====
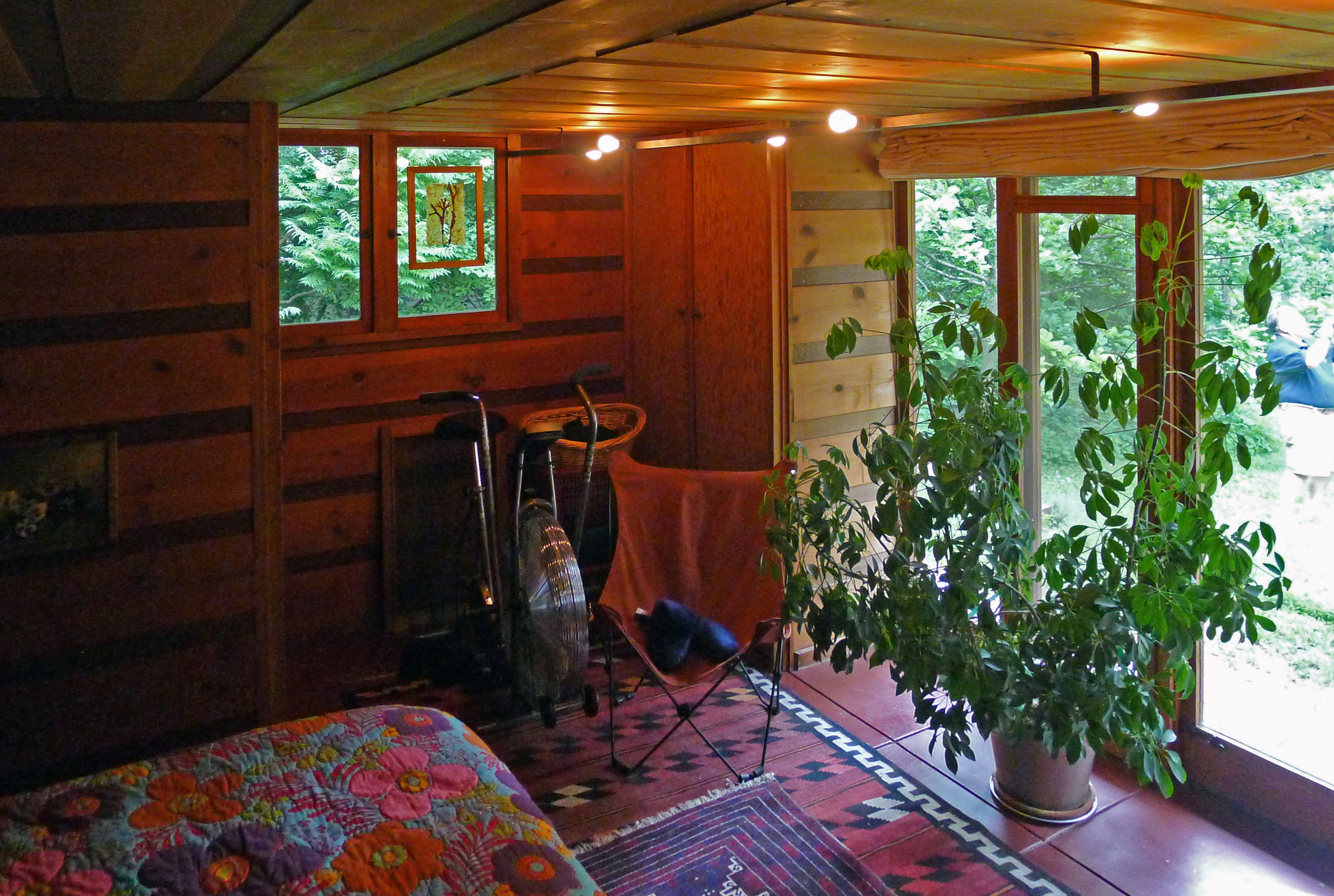
Master bedroom

The house has three bedrooms, which are located in the building's northern wing. According to Herb Jacobs, Wright had told him that putting the bedrooms and the living spaces in separate wings would "ensure greater privacy and quiet". The three bedrooms include a study at the eastern end; it is unknown why Wright's plans label the third bedroom as a study. The bedrooms are connected by a hallway on the north side of the north wing, which terminates in the study. The hallway turns twice before reaching the study, widening into a 7-by-7-foot (2.1 m × 2.1 m) space just outside that room. This square space is also known as the "shop".

The bedrooms, including the study, are all 12 feet (3.7 m) wide. The first bedroom is generally square in plan and measures 12 by 12 feet across, with a closet protruding into the space; it has three doors facing south toward the garden. The second bedroom is larger, with six doors abutting the garden; the eastern wall of the room has a window and an alcove measuring 4 by 6 feet (1.2 by 1.8 m) across, which is flanked by a closet on both sides. The study is the smallest of the three bedrooms, measuring 8 feet (2.4 m) wide, with three windows to the north and a door facing south toward the garden. The study also has a built-in bed and a desk. There are storage shelves measuring 12 by 7 feet (4 by 2 m) across and 2 feet (0.61 m) deep. Under these shelves is space for storing larger pieces of clothing.

==== Mechanical and structural features ====
The foundation consists of a Cherokee-red concrete slab placed atop a layer of sand or gravel. The radiant heating system consists of hot-water pipes embedded into the concrete slab, which eliminated the need for radiators and millwork radiator covers. The system was inspired by a similar heating system that Wright had seen in Tokyo several years previously. The pipes each measure 2 inches (51 mm) across and are arranged in circuits, with four underneath the living room and three underneath the bedrooms. The furnace that provided the steam heat was located in the cellar. Herb would later write that "steam for our size house had simply not been the right answer"; the easternmost bedroom was consistently cold during the winter, since the steam flowed through the living-room circuits before flowing through the bedroom circuits.

To save money, only the kitchen and bathroom were equipped with plumbing in the original design. Wright kept electrical wiring to a minimum, embedding the wires in U-shaped channels; one source described the lighting system as an "electrical raceway" with lamps placed only where necessary. There were originally 48 lightbulb sockets, each of which is exposed because Wright did not care about the appearance of bare lightbulbs. The light sockets within the low-ceilinged bedrooms were placed on the walls, while the living spaces had light sockets on both the walls and the ceilings. After James Dennis acquired the house, he disassembled some of the sandwich walls to add electrical wiring.

== Impact ==
=== Reception ===
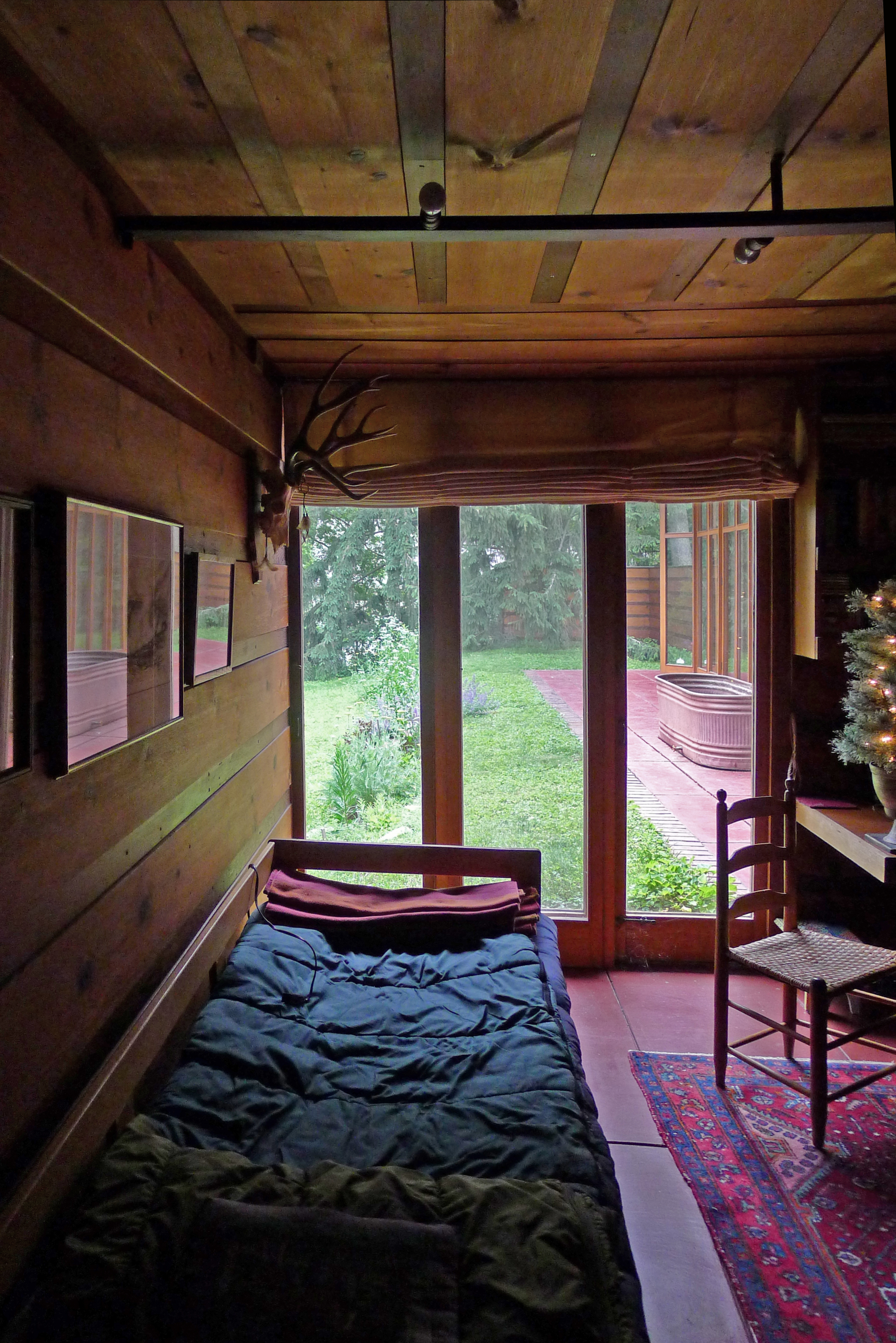
One of the secondary bedrooms

When the house was finished, the Honolulu Star-Bulletin wrote that the structure "demonstrates Wright's sound planning and his sensitive use of materials". The Berea Citizen characterized the Jacobs House and Fallingwater as examples of how Wright adapted his designs to the surrounding landscape. Geoffrey Baker wrote in The New York Times that "Wright certainly has some contribution to make, possibly by inspiration rather than example", with regard to the design of low-cost houses; this prompted Herb to write an indignant response to the Times. The Evening Star of Washington, D.C., wrote that the house and other Usonian designs "resemble too much the homes now maintained in up-to-date poultry farms for fowls being fed for slaughter".

In the 1980s, John Welchman of The New York Times likened the building's exterior to a graphic-design logo because of its straight lines and detailing. John Sergeant described the interior spaces as "complex and ambiguous", while he felt that the facade "gives a clear sense of identity from the street and private domain once within". Alvin Rosenbaum wrote in 1993 that the house combined the welcoming nature of his larger houses and the functionality of his smaller houses, while the architectural critic Blair Kamin described it as having "the same earth-hugging sweep as the architect's more expensive Prairie houses". The architectural writer Robert McCarter wrote in 1997 that the house's design might have been inspired by Japanese residential architecture, as well as by a principle espoused by the 19th-century German architect Gottfried Semper in which the floor slab, chimney, roof, and walls were constructed in that order. The same year, a Capital Times reporter praised the building as "brilliant in its mathematical and almost musical rhythm of proportions". The biographer Meryle Secrest said the house had been a "present in disguise" for Wright because it had forced him to design inexpensively.

Whitney Gould of the Milwaukee Journal Sentinel, a former student of James Dennis, wrote in 2003: "No show-off flourishes here. And that was exactly the point." Carla Lind, the author of a book about Wright's Usonian designs, wrote that "the horizontal grounding of the Jacobs house to its site seems as natural as the materials from which it was built". A writer for the Toronto Star described the house in 2022 as having a "soothing aura of impenetrable middle-class privacy" due to the design of its windows, wooden walls, and roofs. John Waters of the Frank Lloyd Wright Building Conservancy said that the basic principles of later Usonian houses had all come from the Jacobs House, and a 2006 issue of Fine Homebuilding magazine listed it among the United States' 25 most important houses. Kristine Hansen, one of Wright's biographers, said in 2026 that the Jacobs House "remains the Wright home I have felt the most at home in".

=== Architectural influence ===
Herb Jacobs reflected that both his first and second houses became widely known "to our astonishment—and sometimes inconvenience"; the first house in particular received large amounts of international attention. Their daughter Susan recalled that visitors would often "get down on their hands and knees" to examine the underfloor heating system. Images of the house were shown in Architectural Forum magazine's January 1938 issue on Wright's work; the Jacobs House generated more response than any other house featured in that issue. Herb Jacobs also sold pictures of the house to Time magazine for $50, (Note: About $1,120 in 2025) even though the magazine never published the images. The popularity of the Jacobs House prompted people from across the U.S. to contact Wright, asking him to design their houses. Wright himself perceived the house as an architectural breakthrough for his work. He later said: "The house of moderate cost is not only America's major architectural problem, but the problem most difficult for her major architects. As for me, I would rather solve it with satisfaction to myself and Usonia than build anything I can think of at the moment."

Wright continued to refine the house's architectural features in subsequent projects, devoting his later career to designing Usonian houses. Some of the architectural features used in the house were popularized after its completion. Wright frequently used three such elements: board-and-batten walls, a radiant heating system, and a modular floor grid. Among the house's other widely used architectural features were the minimalist lighting system, the carport, the corner windows, and the open-plan rooms. Secrest said that he frequently looked for opportunities to reuse the house's floor plan. He ultimately designed dozens of similar Usonian homes across the country, (Note: Sources disagree on whether 35, 40, or 140 homes were inspired by the Jacobs House's design.) such as L-shaped houses for clients in the western, midwestern, and southern U.S., along with the Marshall Erdman Prefab Houses of the 1950s. Some of these L-shaped plans, such as the Rosenbaum House in Alabama, faced away from the street as the Jacobs House had. Like the Jacobs First House, these homes typically had flat roofs and carport entrances, both features that the FHA was reluctant to fund.

The design of the Jacobs First House has influenced those of houses designed by other architects, such as a residence designed by Jeffrey Cain in Saukville, Wisconsin; rowhouses designed by Joseph Eichler in the San Francisco Bay Area; and a "house kit" design that private homeowners could buy and assemble themselves. The design is also credited with having influenced ranch houses of the 1950s, as well as tract housing. In 1961, the University of Wisconsin Institute on the Esthetic of Frank Lloyd Wright cited the Jacobs First House as one of two Madison buildings that had greatly contributed to American architecture, the other being the unbuilt Yahara Boat Club.

=== Media and exhibits ===
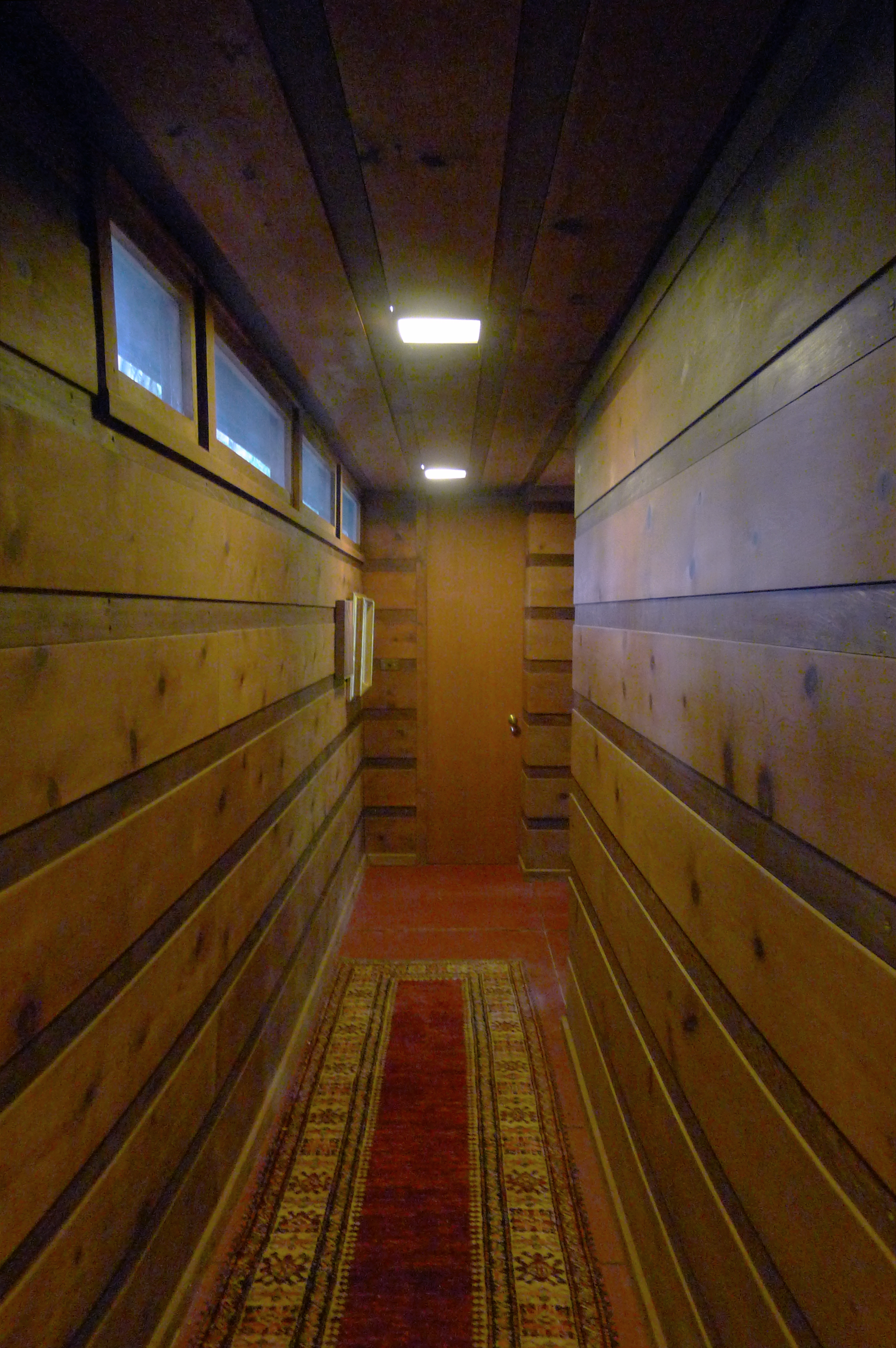
Hallway behind the bedrooms

After the house was completed, photographs of the building were displayed at the Honolulu Academy of Arts, the Williston Academy, and the Wisconsin Union Theater. A model of the house was shown in a 1940 exhibit at New York's Museum of Modern Art (MoMA), and another model of the house was displayed at MoMA in 1994. The Solomon R. Guggenheim Museum, also in New York, displayed a model of the building in 2009 as part of its exhibition Frank Lloyd Wright: From Within Outward.

Herb and Katherine Jacobs wrote a book about their two houses, Frank Lloyd Wright: An Illustrated Memoir, which was published in 1978. The house is also detailed in Uncommon Places: The Architecture of Frank Lloyd Wright, a documentary that aired on PBS Wisconsin in 1984, and Frank Lloyd Wright, a 1997 book by the historian Robert McCarter.

=== Landmark designations ===
The Jacobs First House was added to the National Register of Historic Places (NRHP) in 1974, and Madison's City Landmarks Commission designated the Jacobs First House as a municipal landmark the same year. The house was re-added to the NRHP as a National Historic Landmark in 2003, and a plaque commemorating this designation was installed in 2005. The United States Department of the Interior nominated the Jacobs First House and nine other Wright-designed buildings to the World Heritage List in 2015; the buildings had previously been nominated in 2011. UNESCO added eight properties, including the Jacobs First House, to the World Heritage List in July 2019 under the title "The 20th-Century Architecture of Frank Lloyd Wright". The house was listed as a World Heritage Site because it had been Wright's first Usonian house.

== See also ==
- National Register of Historic Places listings in Madison, Wisconsin
- List of National Historic Landmarks in Wisconsin
- List of Frank Lloyd Wright works
