= Herbert Jacobs =

American journalist (1903–1987)

Herbert Austin Jacobs (April 8, 1903 – May 20, 1987) was an American journalist for the Milwaukee Journal and later a professor of journalism at the University of California, Berkeley.

== Houses ==
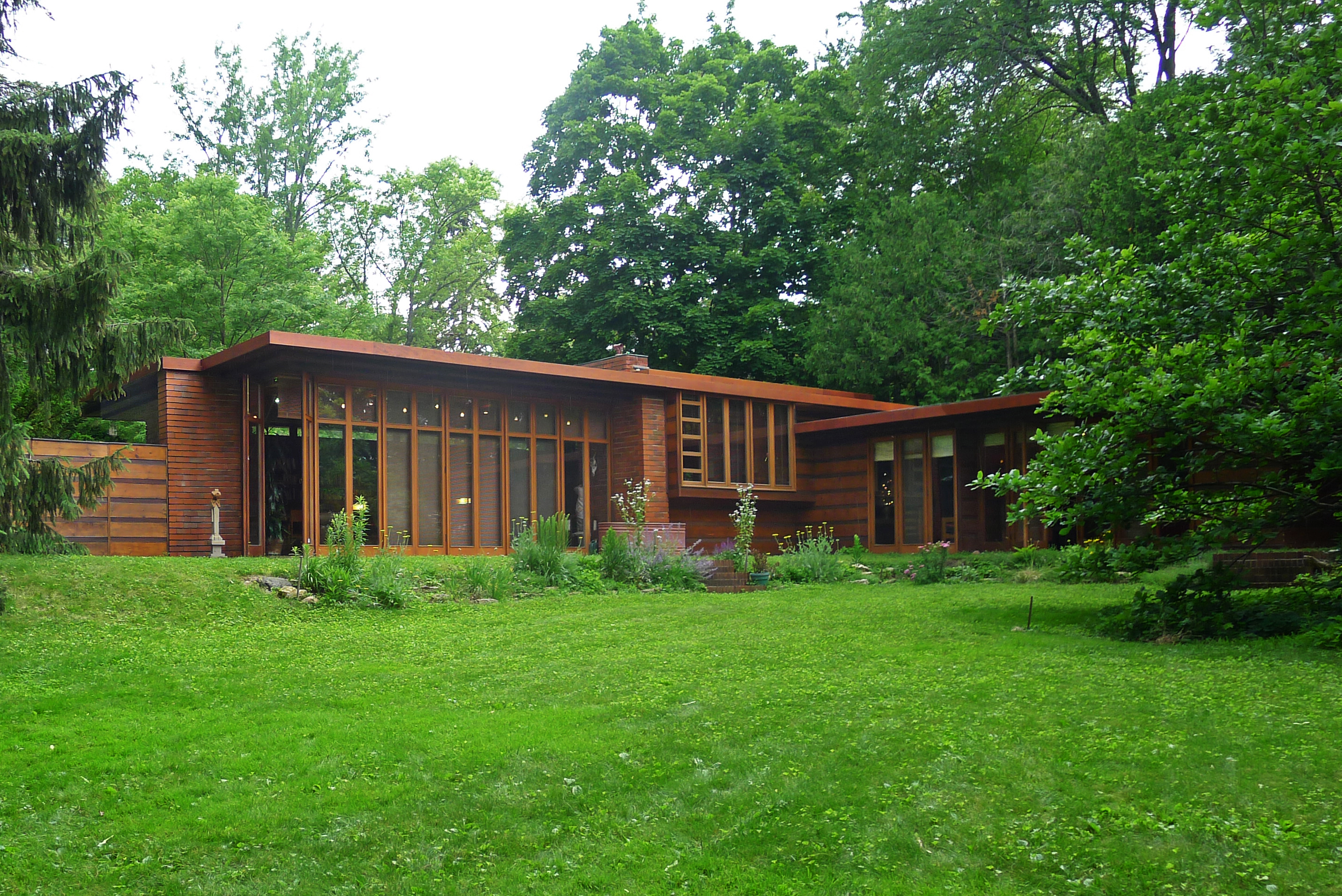
1936 house from back yard

Jacobs was a friend of Frank Lloyd Wright. Jacobs and his wife Katherine commissioned Wright to design a house for them. This house, the Herbert and Katherine Jacobs First House, is sometimes called Wright's first Usonian home.

Later, they commissioned Wright to design another house for them, the Herbert and Katherine Jacobs Second House.

== Jacobs method for crowd size estimation ==
Jacobs worked for the Milwaukee Journal from 1931 until 1936, then for Madison's Capital Times. After retirement in 1962, he taught journalism at the University of California, Berkeley.

Jacobs was present in Berkeley during the Berkeley riots. It was at this time that he devised a method for measuring crowd size, the Jacobs Method:

[Jacobs's] office was in a tower that overlooked the plaza where students frequently gathered to protest the Vietnam War. The plaza was marked with regular grid lines, which allowed Jacobs to see how many grid squares were filled with students and how many students on average packed into each grid. After gathering data on numerous demonstrations, Jacobs came up with some rules of thumb that still are used today by those serious about crowd estimation. A loose crowd, one where each person is an arm's length from the body of his or her nearest neighbors, needs 10 square feet [0.93 m^{2}] per person. A more tightly packed crowd fills 4.5 square feet [0.42 m^{2}] per person. A truly scary mob of mosh-pit density would get about 2.5 square feet [0.23 m^{2}] per person.

== Personal ==
Jacobs was born April 8, 1903 in Milwaukee, Wisconsin, and died of cancer on May 20, 1987 in Berkeley.
