= Auldbrass Plantation =

Historic house in Yemassee, South Carolina

- Old Brass (Auldbrass)
- U.S. National Register of Historic Places
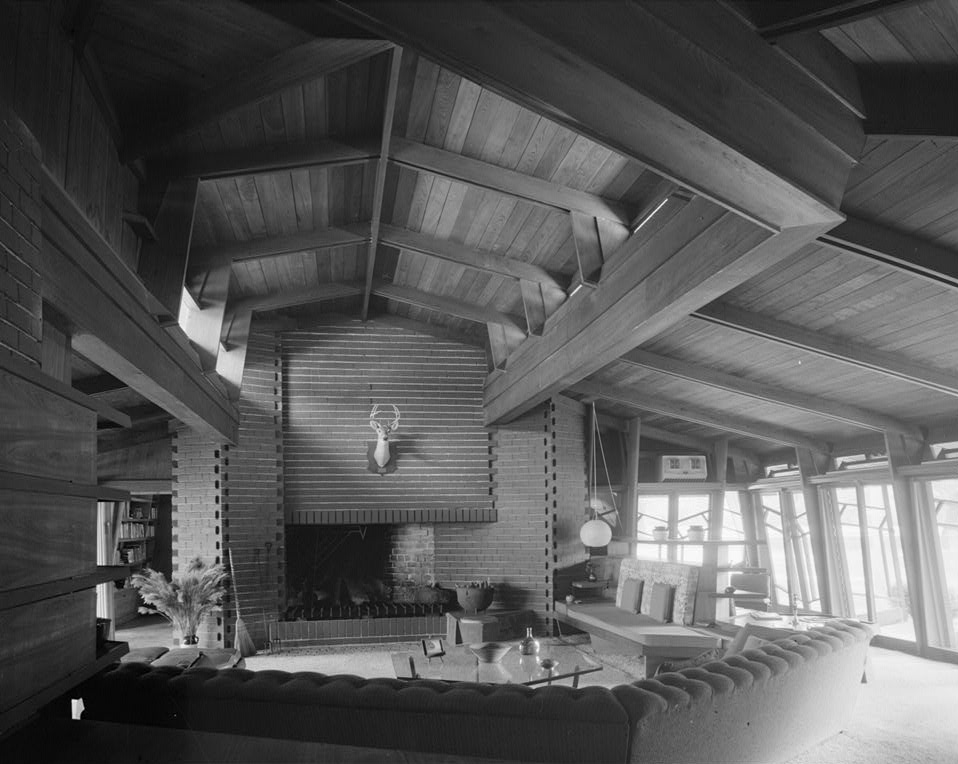
- Living room

- Location within South Carolina Location within the United States
- Nearest city: Yemassee, South Carolina
- Coordinates: 32°40′51″N 80°48′47″W
- Area: 326 acres (132 ha)
- Built: 1941
- Architect: Frank Lloyd Wright
- Architectural style: Modern Movement
- NRHP reference No.: 76001693
- Added to NRHP: June 3, 1976

Auldbrass Plantation (sometimes spelled Auld Brass) is a plantation in Beaufort County, South Carolina, United States, near the town of Yemassee. The building complex, consisting of more than 20 structures, was designed by Frank Lloyd Wright and built starting in 1939. It is the only plantation complex Wright designed, as well as one of two buildings he designed in South Carolina, the other being Broad Margin in Greenville. The plantation was added to the National Register of Historic Places in 1976.

The plantation originally spanned 4,253 acres (1,721 ha) and was previously composed of several separate tracts, which were granted to various colonists in 1731 and later acquired by Charles Leigh Stevens, an industrial consultant. One of the tracts was a land grant known as Old Brass, which was renamed Auldbrass after Stevens hired Wright to design a plantation there. Though most of the buildings were completed in the early 1950s, other structures remained unbuilt for several decades. After Stevens's death in 1962, his daughter Jessica Loring owned it until 1979, when it was sold to the paper company Westvaco, then to a group of hunters. It was purchased in 1986 by film producer Joel Silver, who began a multi-year renovation of the plantation, constructing some of the unbuilt structures from Wright's original plans. After the first phase of the renovation was finished in 1989, Auldbrass was occasionally opened to the public for limited tours.

Auldbrass includes a plantation house, cottages, guest house, caretaker's quarters, chicken shed, kennels, stables, and granary. The plantation house and the other buildings had hexagonal floor plans. The plantation had no grand entrance, and the buildings were inspired by the nature around it, with sloping cypress wood walls and copper roofs. The plantation house consists of two bedrooms, a study, and two bathrooms arranged around a living room. Near the plantation house are a cluster of farm buildings measuring 500 or 600 feet (150 or 180 m) long, in addition to servants' cottages.

== Site ==
The Auldbrass Plantation is located along the ACE Basin in Beaufort County, just southwest of the Combahee River, in the Lowcountry area of South Carolina, United States. The plantation is situated near the town of Yemassee, along River Road (Highway S-7-33). At the property's perimeter, a fence runs along River Road, which an access driveway intersects at a 60-degree angle. The plantation itself has an area of 326 acres (132 ha). The surrounding area has several large plantations such as Cherokee Plantation and Nemours Plantation.

The plantation originally spanned 4,253 acres (1,721 ha), composed of several separate tracts that were later acquired by Charles Leigh Stevens, an industrial consultant. A series of gravel driveways and landscaped esplanades connect the plantation's structures; the house's architect Frank Lloyd Wright had wanted to use red granite, but this was not done because it was too expensive. A covered walkway connects the buildings around the plantation house. The landscape architect Thomas D. Church was responsible for the landscape design, which included a low wall around the plantation house and several formal decorative planting beds. The plantation is illuminated at night by 500 lamps. Joel Silver, who acquired Auldbrass in 1986, added various sculptures to the property after acquiring it. Wright constructed a drainage canal and artificial lake on the property, but after the original lake dried up, it was not rebuilt until the 1990s.

=== Previous usage ===
Prior to European colonization of the Americas, the land was occupied by the indigenous Yamasee, who were forced out in 1715 during the Yamasee War. The land was parceled out and land grants were given to various colonists, starting in 1731. The site of Auldbrass contained as many as 16 land grants during the mid-18th century. The property owners built several structures on their respective properties, none of which survive. The grant for Mount Pleasant, the land surrounding the current plantation's main building, was issued in 1736 to Charles Barker and originally covered 474 acres (192 ha). This later became the property of John Deas, whose house was completed in 1758, at the site of the main building.

Several of the smaller grants had been combined by 1760; five of these land grants—Mount Pleasant, Mount Alexander, Charlton, Richfield, and Old Combahee—would eventually be combined to form Auldbrass. James Michie owned the Richfield and Mount Alexander grants, and Walter Izard owned Old Combahee. The first use of the name "Old Brass" for the plantation is attributed to John H. Screven, who bought Mount Pleasant in 1859 and sold it five years later to William Middleton. It is not known how the name "Old Brass" came about, but the name is variously cited as having been derived from slaves' skin color, a specific slave, or a landing on the river. In any case, James U. Jackson obtained Old Brass and some adjacent land at the beginning of the 20th century. During World War I, Jackson's land was acquired by the Savannah River Lumber Company; Stevens acquired the land in 1938.

== History ==
After living in several places across the U.S., Stevens developed a house in Westwood, Massachusetts, in the 1920s, where he planned to build a large estate. Only the gardener's cottage had been completed when the Great Depression began. Stevens lived there until 1934, and his family owned it until 1993. When Stevens approached Wright to design the plantation in the late 1930s, the architect was busy with several major commissions, having completed Fallingwater in Pennsylvania and the Johnson Wax Administration Building in Wisconsin. At the time, many wealthy people from the Northern United States had acquired plantations in the South Carolina Lowcountry, where they spent their winters.

=== Development and early years ===
==== Planning ====
It is unclear why Stevens hired Wright, but he had written a letter to the architect by December 1938, asking Wright to design him a house. Stevens requested that the architect design him a fully functioning farm, where Stevens could test out agricultural innovations. Wright agreed because he had never designed a farm in the Southern United States. After clearing underbrush and timber from the site, Stevens sent Wright photographs of the site in April 1939, along with two books on traditional Southern plantations to indicate what he did not want. Wright ultimately drew around 500 drawings for the plantation. The first drawings, completed in July 1939, called for a garden, plantation house, and guesthouse clustered along the river, in addition to farm buildings clustered farther away from the water. These structures all had hexagonal floor plans and were connected by a pathway, with a shared roof over each cluster of buildings. The guesthouse was to have space for 15 people, and there were to be separate accommodations for a property manager and servants.

Wright sent Stevens a revised plan for the plantation in August 1939, adding cabins and a swimming pool. By then, the farm buildings included space for 40 dogs, 15 horses or mules, 500 chickens, and 5 cows. It was around this time that Wright renamed the plantation from "Old Brass" to "Auldbrass", using the Scottish word for "old" in a reference to his mother's Welsh heritage. Stevens wrote to Wright twice in late 1939, asking to see the plans, but Wright did not complete his plans until January 1940. The revised plans called for a plantation house and a larger guesthouse on the riverbank, as well as a cluster of farm buildings farther inland; the two clusters of buildings were oriented parallel to each other. As built, the plantation largely adhered to these plans, with minor changes. Simultaneously, Stevens had to give up his Massachusetts house after divorcing his first wife, and he set up a trust to prevent his South Carolina property from being seized, which delayed the start of Auldbrass's construction. The divorce would be finalized in 1942.

==== First phase of construction ====
Two of Wright's senior apprentices completed the plantation's working drawings in August 1940. Though construction began the next month, the project was immediately hampered by a lack of construction materials. Delays also arose due to Wright's unfamiliarity with the site, Stevens's unavailability, and the unconventional design details (the plans for which local contractors could not fully comprehend). Stevens hired the contractor C. P. Street of the J. J. McDevitt Company to construct the buildings, which were estimated to cost around $90,000. (Note: Equivalent to $1,617,000 in 2025) (Note: According to De Long 2003, p. 98, the costs were divided as follows: $17,163 for the main house (equivalent to $308,312 in 2025); $28,153 for the guesthouse (equivalent to $505,735 in 2025); $43,002 for the other buildings (equivalent to $772,479 in 2025)) T. F. Haddock of the McDevitt Company was appointed as the construction supervisor, and Peter Berndtson, a junior apprentice of Wright's firm, supervised the design. Wright's son-in-law, William Wesley Peters, oversaw later stages of construction. Due to wartime material shortages, copper foil was substituted for copper, and the cypress boards had to be cut to a narrower thickness than originally proposed. Despite uncertainty concerning the structural details, concrete foundation pads were being poured for the farm buildings by the end of 1940.

The caretaker's house and some of the farm buildings were nearly completed by mid-1941. Wright had to adjust the plans due to his unfamiliarity with the site; the positions of the plantation house and guesthouse were swapped for reasons that have never been documented. In addition, Stevens divorced and remarried twice, and he changed the plans every time he remarried. After receiving the first set of revised plans in August 1941, Stevens directed the McDevitt Company to begin constructing the plantation house. Stevens also ordered material for the plantation, even as wartime restrictions had created shortages of objects such as wood and copper. By the end of 1941, many of the farm buildings were finished, and work on the plantation house just starting. Stevens also contemplated constructing several additional outbuildings that were not constructed, such as a bathhouse and large staff cottage.

A reporter for the Atlanta Journal, who visited the plantation in early 1942, wrote that Haddock "had no idea when it would be completed" and predicted that the project would cost $200,000. (Note: Equivalent to $3,112,000 in 2025) Nonetheless, work on the plantation house progressed more quickly than the farm buildings, and the house was completed by December 1942. Afterward, construction was halted because of a lack of funds and Stevens's unavailability. Stevens still owed tens of thousands of dollars to McDevitt Company (by then known as McDevitt & Street), who filed a lien against the property in 1943; the lien was lifted the next year, before the plantation could be sold at a foreclosure auction. Additionally, Stevens's second wife Ann was uninterested in Auldbrass's development, despite his efforts to bring her into the project. The plantation house's copper roof, which fell into disrepair soon after the building was completed, was subsequently resurfaced in asphalt and tar.

==== Completion and usage ====
In part because of World War II and the challenges in carrying out the design, the plantation was not completed until 1952 or 1953. After several years of stagnation, Wright completed additional drawings during late 1946 and early 1947. Stevens moved into the caretaker's house while the rest of the complex was being completed. By early 1948, however, design work had again stalled. Stevens began lecturing at Harvard Business School and divorced Ann that year, which resulted in further delays. Stevens remarried in 1950 to Nina Katherine Lunn, who, unlike Stevens's previous wives, made extensive changes to Auldbrass's design. For instance, she requested an "owner's kitchen" and new furniture, and wanted the passageway between the main kitchen and the rest of the plantation house to be enclosed. Nina also disliked the exposed wood and red concrete floor, and reportedly tried to burn some of the Wright–designed furniture. She repainted the bedrooms, ordered new draperies and furniture, and requested that three of the outbuildings be redesigned to accommodate guests. Wright, exasperated at the changes, messaged Stevens: "All hope lost."

Several of the farm buildings, including the stable and barns, were destroyed in a fire in March 1952. Parts of the farm-building cluster, the staff cabins, and the plantation house escaped serious damage, but firefighters had to chop through the farm complex's roof to fight the fire. The destroyed buildings were largely not rebuilt, except for a hexagonal tool shed. Nina's changes to the plantation caused marital strife, and Stevens wrote in early 1953 that he would not invite her back to the plantation and that her changes would be reversed. He hired Thomas D. Church to prepare a landscape design for the plantation, which was implemented with few changes. After Stevens invited Nina back to the plantation later that year, Wright drew up plans for the housekeeper's cottage and an enclosed kitchen breezeway, which were not carried out at the time. Stevens also attempted to create a lake, supplied by a pump, but the lake dried up after the pump stopped working.

Meanwhile, Stevens attempted to use the plantation as a functional farm, though it was never large enough for commercial-level farming. He raised chickens and cattle on the plantation, and he kept horses and dogs for riding and hunting excursions. Stevens and Nina were increasingly living in South Carolina in the late 1950s, adding small air conditioners so they could live there in the summer. They continued to make modifications to the design, including to the bathroom, kitchen, and fireplaces. Nina's continued disdain for the plantation's design eventually helped prompt a permanent separation, with the couple divorcing in June 1957, a month before Stevens married his fourth wife, Barbara. According to Stevens's daughter Jessica Stevens Loring, Barbara is known to have made only one modification to the design: a decorative pool outside the plantation house's master bedroom, which had been designed by Church.

=== 1960s to mid-1980s ===
==== Loring ownership ====
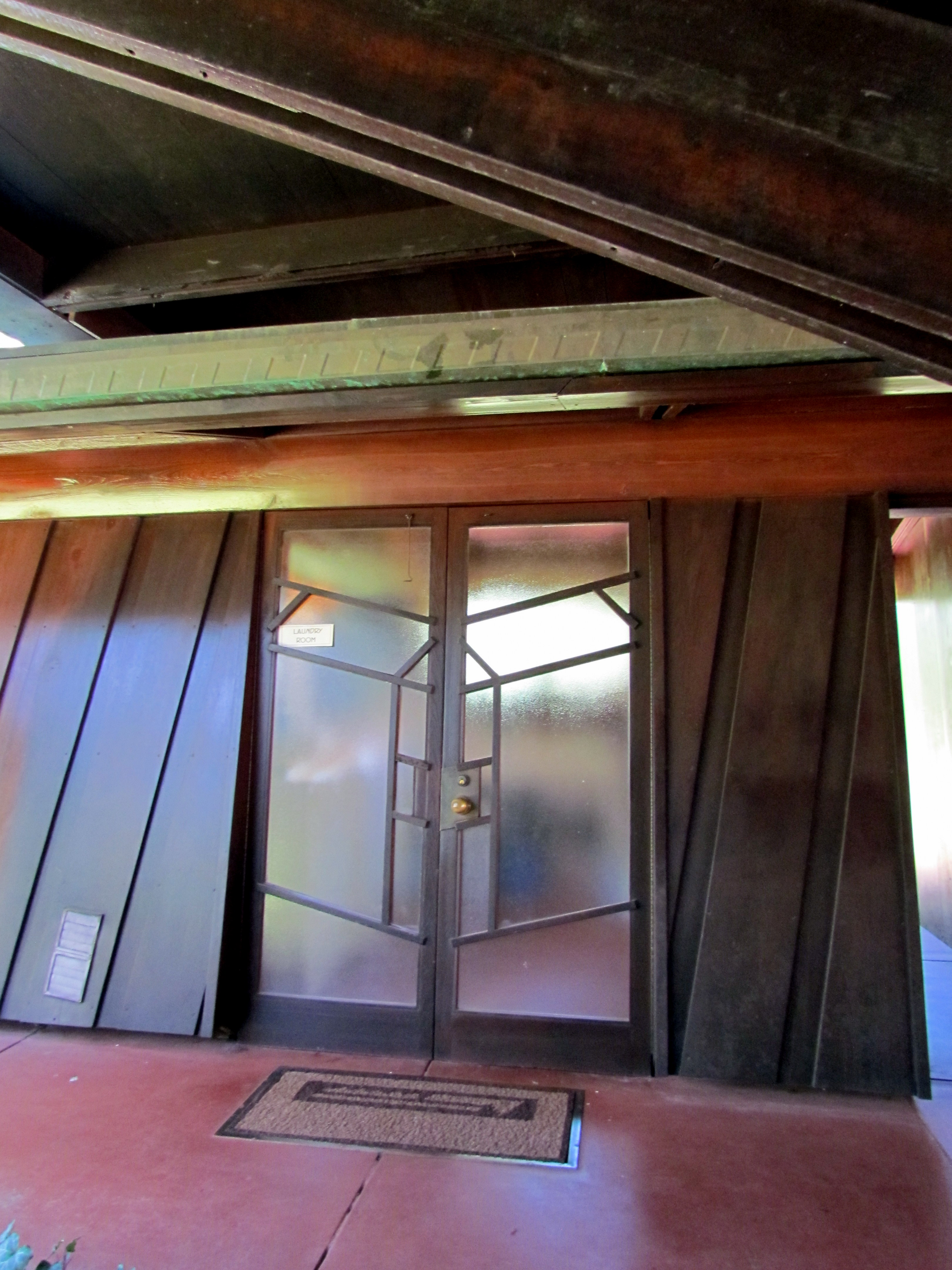
A door at Auldbrass

Stevens was still living at Auldbrass when he died in 1962, bequeathing it to his children and widow. Jessica Loring and her husband maintained the plantation for the next 17 years. When Barbara moved to California in 1964, she sold her ownership stake to Jessica, who subsequently moved into the plantation house in 1966. Jessica became the property's sole owner in 1970, buying out her brother's stake. By then, the farm animals had long since been sold off, and the farmland covered only 200 acres (81 ha). The Lorings, having no farm animals, instead chose to raise crops for money, but they did not earn very much, and were unable to hire enough farmhands to help with the crops. Furthermore, the various plantation buildings were scattered across a wide area, making them hard to maintain.

The Lorings began renovating the main building in 1971, reversing some of Nina's modifications to the design. They also gave tours to everyone who came to the plantation, producing a brochure about the property's history. Among the Lorings' guests were the journalist Herbert Jacobs (who had hired Wright to design his first and second houses in Wisconsin), the architectural writer William Allin Storrer, and local church groups. The Loring family announced plans in 1974 to sell 3,000 acres (1,200 ha) of the plantation, including a small tract that lay in Hampton County. The family also nominated the plantation for inclusion on the National Register of Historic Places (NRHP), as they wanted the building to be preserved in perpetuity, but it was becoming increasingly difficult for them to maintain the plantation alone.

By 1975, the South Carolina Department of Parks, Recreation and Tourism had expressed interest in buying Auldbrass from the Loring family, even though it had no money on hand. It also asked the American Institute of Architects' South Carolina chapter and Clemson University's architecture school to examine the plantation, to determine whether the architectural community was interested. The plantation was added to the NRHP on June 3, 1976; the designation applied to 326 acres (132 ha) of the site. This made Auldbrass the first piece of 20th-century architecture in South Carolina to be added to the NRHP. A plaque commemorating the designation was installed at a ceremony in November 1976.

==== Subsequent sales ====
In 1979, Jessica Loring sold the western section of her land, including the plantation house and outbuildings, to a company called Boise Cascade. Loring retained ownership of an adjacent section of the land, which corresponded to the former Old Combahee land grant and spanned more than 1,850 acres (750 ha). In the meantime, the family moved to Connecticut, taking the architectural drawings and some of the furniture with them. Dozens of pieces of furniture from Auldbrass (Note: Sources disagree on whether 29 or 50 pieces were auctioned off.) were auctioned off by Sotheby's in 1981, and the Metropolitan Museum of Art in New York obtained some of the house's other furniture. Some of the blueprints ended up in the possession of Don Misoni, an architecture fan from Wausau, Wisconsin.

Shortly after buying Auldbrass, Boise Cascade sold it to the paper company Westvaco. The latter sale included a 2,158-acre (873 ha) section of the plantation in Beaufort County and a 252-acre (102 ha) parcel in Hampton County. In turn, Westvaco offered to sell the plantation house and about 50 acres (20 ha) around it; at the time, though the building was listed on the NRHP, it was not well known outside the architectural community. The same year, the South Carolina Heritage Trust Foundation agreed to give the plantation legal protection from demolition, though Westvaco would continue to own the building until a new owner was found. Westvaco placed the plantation for sale in 1980. In 1981, Westvaco ultimately sold the plantation house, and about 100 acres (40 ha) surrounding it, to William Mixon. By then, Auldbrass was one of 19 plantations remaining in Beaufort County.

After Mixon purchased the property, the plantation house was used by a gun club which, according to Wright's grandson Eric Lloyd Wright, "parked boats in the living room, turned bedrooms into bunk rooms and made the main kitchen into a slaughter room". The gun club stopped maintaining the house because it was too difficult for them to do so. Mixon sought to sell the plantation in the mid-1980s but was unable to find a buyer willing to pay several hundred thousand dollars for the complex. The group offered to donate the property to Clemson University, but the university declined the offer and instead constructed an academic complex nearby. Instead, Mixon and his partners decided to give the Beaufort County Open Land Trust an easement in exchange for a tax deduction. By then, Eric said, the plantation was in "terrible shape, just pathetic". The heating system had stopped working, the roof's eaves had begun to sag, and the wood was in various stages of decay. There were also damaged windows and screens, allowing pests to enter the buildings.

=== Silver ownership ===
The gun club hired real-estate appraiser Donna Butler to help them facilitate the plantation's sale. Butler contacted Tom Schmidt, who was affiliated with the Western Pennsylvania Conservancy, the organization that operated Fallingwater. In October 1986, Schmidt told the film producer Joel Silver of the plantation. Silver was a fan of Wright's architecture and lived in the Wright-designed Storer House in Los Angeles, although he had never visited the Lowcountry. Schmidt told Silver that the complex could be acquired for about $100,000, (Note: Equivalent to $249,000 in 2025) an amount that Silver had previously paid for a single table. However, this amount covered only the donation that Silver was obligated to make to the Open Land Trust as part of the sale; he had to also buy the buildings and land themselves.

==== Purchase and initial renovation ====
Silver purchased Auldbrass in December 1986, (Note: Some sources give an alternate date of 1987.) along with 35 acres (14 ha) surrounding it. He originally owned the plantation with several partners, who later sold him their ownership stakes. After further negotiations with the sellers, Silver obtained 55 acres (22 ha) (consisting of the plantation and the 35 acres surrounding it) for a total cost of $130,000 (Note: Equivalent to $323,000 in 2025) or $148,000. (Note: Equivalent to $368,000 in 2025) Just under $100,000 of this amount was used to pay off a mortgage on the plantation. As a condition of the sale, the trust and the Historic Charleston Foundation were entitled to hold public tours multiple times a year. Silver hired Scott McNair to manage the property in 1989; McNair later recalled that he constantly had to turn away people who unexpectedly came to the plantation and asked for tours.

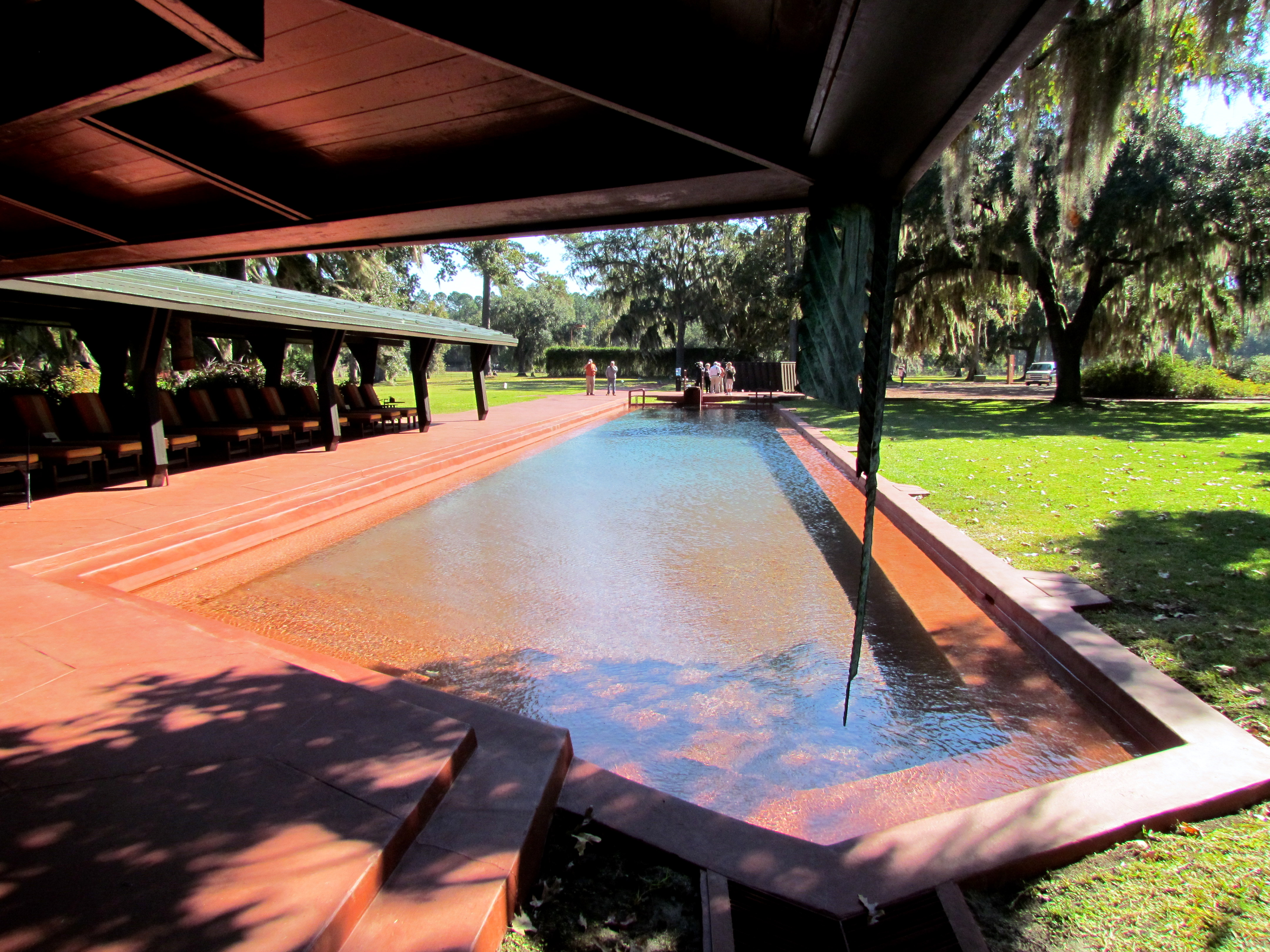
A swimming pool, which had been part of the original design but never constructed, was completed during Silver's renovation.

As part of his purchase, Silver agreed to finish renovating the plantation house within three years of buying the plantation. He hired Eric Lloyd Wright as a consultant, and Bennett Strahan to design Auldbrass's renovation. Silver borrowed some of Wright's original drawings from the Loring family. The project was split into four phases, the first of which involved restoring the remaining buildings. The second phase involved rebuilding structures that had been destroyed, while the third phase would entail completing several unbuilt structures designed by Wright. As part of the fourth and final phase, Silver would erect additional structures for his own use, which would be designed in a similar style to the existing structures but located farther away. The renovation cost was initially estimated at $400–500 thousand. (Note: Equivalent to $1.0–1.2 million in 2025)

Parts of the plantation house were rebuilt to Wright's original specifications, which involved removing elements such as Nina's kitchen. The roof and downspouts were replaced, and steel posts were added to reinforce the eaves. An unbuilt swimming pool from the original design was constructed, and a tennis court was built next to the pool. Strahan built replicas of the original furniture, and he stripped back 15 layers of paint to uncover the house's original cypress beams. Silver, who sought to replicate the original design as closely as possible, bought two vehicles that Wright had owned just so he could examine the "Taliesin red" color that Wright liked. Kendall Pierce was hired to replace or restore the woodwork, and Steve Guild developed a wax coating for the floors, since the original wax coating was no longer legal in the U.S. In addition, Silver installed new mechanical systems, and he replaced overhead electric wires with 6,000 feet (1,800 m) of underground ducts and wires. The main house's renovation was completed in June 1989, and the swimming pool was finished that October. Sources disagree on whether the initial stage of construction cost either $1 million (Note: Equivalent to $2.2 million in 2025) or $2.5 million. (Note: Equivalent to $5.4 million in 2025)

==== 1990s renovations ====
The public was invited to tour the house in November 1989 after the first phase of the project was completed. Afterward, it was opened to the public once a year, and Silver wanted to build a visitor center in the long run. The facades had to be oiled every year so they could retain their color. The soffits and interiors had to be oiled regularly as well, albeit less frequently. By the early 1990s, Silver primarily lived in the Storer House but also visited Auldbrass twice monthly. He invited film personalities such as Sylvester Stallone, Bruce Willis, and Demi Moore to the plantation. During the 1990s, Silver dredged out Wright and Stevens's original lake, adding water pumps so that the water would not dry up, and he acquired additional land next to the plantation.

After renovating the main house, Silver rebuilt the other structures. In mid-1992, Silver requested permission from the South Carolina Coastal Council to fill in about 2 acres (0.81 ha) of wetlands. Three cabins would be built on the filled land. Silver had restored one of the staff cabins by then and was in the process of restoring another, having spent $7 million to date. (Note: Equivalent to $14.4 million in 2025) The council gave him permission to construct the buildings and fill in some of the wetlands, but denied his request to construct an access road to the site. Silver had completed a grinding shed by 1994 and was in the process of constructing a guesthouse, barge, garage, and cottages. The caretaker's house was stabilized, as the ground underneath had been weakened during the 1952 fire. Silver rebuilt the outbuildings that were destroyed during the fire, with minor modifications to their width and roof height to provide sufficient headroom. In addition, Silver requested permission from the state and federal governments to install a floating dock at the plantation along the Combahee River.

The South Carolina Nature Conservancy gave Silver a conservation easement in 1995, preventing development on the wildlife refuge next to the Combahee River. Silver donated a stewardship easement to allow the conservancy to maintain the land; these easements were eligible for tax deductions. At that point, Silver had spent $10 million on the renovation; (Note: Equivalent to $19.3 million in 2025) the high costs were attributed to Silver's desire to closely adhere to the original design. Silver completed a pavilion known as River House in 1996, and he finished two pump houses for the newly dredged lake the next year. The Beaufort Gazette wrote in 1997 that the plantation attracted "Frank Lloyd Wright fans from all over the country".

==== 2000s to present ====
The first two phases were finished by 2002, and a marina was completed that year. At that point, Silver had constructed foundation pads for three of the cabins and the guesthouse. Strahan dropped out of the project after the second phase was done, and his associate Tom Crews of Hilton Head Island, South Carolina, oversaw the remaining construction. Silver raised animals such as a hippo, lynx, oryx, and horses on the plantation. To raise money for the Beaufort County Open Land Trust, Silver also hosted tours of Auldbrass, which was open to the public one weekend every two years by the 2000s. The plantation accommodated a maximum of 500 visitors per day, or 1,000 during a weekend, because the decorations were fragile; separate tours were provided in the morning and the afternoon. The Frank Lloyd Wright Building Conservancy has also hosted tours of the plantation.

By 2010, much of the renovation was complete, but the guest house was still under construction, and Crews did not know when the structure would be finished. By the middle of the decade, Silver had spent more than $20 million restoring Auldbrass. The plantation became more widely known after it was featured in a 2015 episode of the TV program CBS News Sunday Morning. After the CBS episode aired, tickets for plantation tours in 2015 and 2017 sold out in five minutes, and prospective visitors sent multiple duplicate emails requesting tickets. To accommodate increased demand, the Beaufort County Open Land Trust began offering tours once a year starting in 2018. One of the outbuildings burned down in October 2024, causing $2 million in damage.

== Architecture ==
The Auldbrass Plantation consists of several buildings; by the 2010s, it was cited as having more than 20 structures. These buildings collectively covered about 10,300 square feet (960 m^{2}). (Note: One source gives a significantly different floor area of 11,245 square feet (1,044.7 m^{2}).) The complex was the only plantation Wright ever designed, as well as one of two designs by Wright in South Carolina, the other being Broad Margin in Greenville. These buildings are also among the relatively few designs that Wright completed in the Southern U.S., along with structures including the Andrew B. Cooke House, Florida Southern College campus, Lewis House, Rosenbaum House, and Jesse R. Zeigler House.

Like many of Wright's other buildings, Auldbrass was designed in an organic style, being influenced by the landscape. The design was intended to harmonize with its site, and the design features differed greatly from those of his other contemporary works, such as Taliesin West in Arizona or Wingspread in Wisconsin. The plantation has no main entrance, and the buildings were arranged and designed so that no specific structure dominated the others. The structures also did not have balconies or columns, like other plantation houses in the U.S. did. The design features all contrasted with those of earlier plantations, where the buildings were symmetrical and arranged in a clear hierarchy. The copper roofs above the buildings cover a surface area of 17,000 square feet (1,600 m^{2}), and none of the structures have interior partitions, except in the bedrooms and bathrooms.

Wright used the same materials in all of Auldbrass's buildings. All of the buildings on the plantation have cypress and cedar facades, which are sourced from the nearby swamp and fastened with brass screws. All of the windows, doors, and walls slant inward at an 80-degree or 81-degree angle from the ground, since Wright wanted his design to evoke the native cypress and oak trees, which lean to one side as they grow. The complex also uses hexagonal motifs extensively. The design generally lacks right angles; a newspaper article from the 1950s proclaimed that "even the fence posts are diamond shaped". One unsubstantiated rumor has it that Stevens challenged Wright not to include any right angles in the plantation, but The Atlanta Journal wrote that even the construction supervisor, T. F. Haddock, did not know why the buildings were designed in such a manner.

=== Plantation house ===
==== Exterior ====
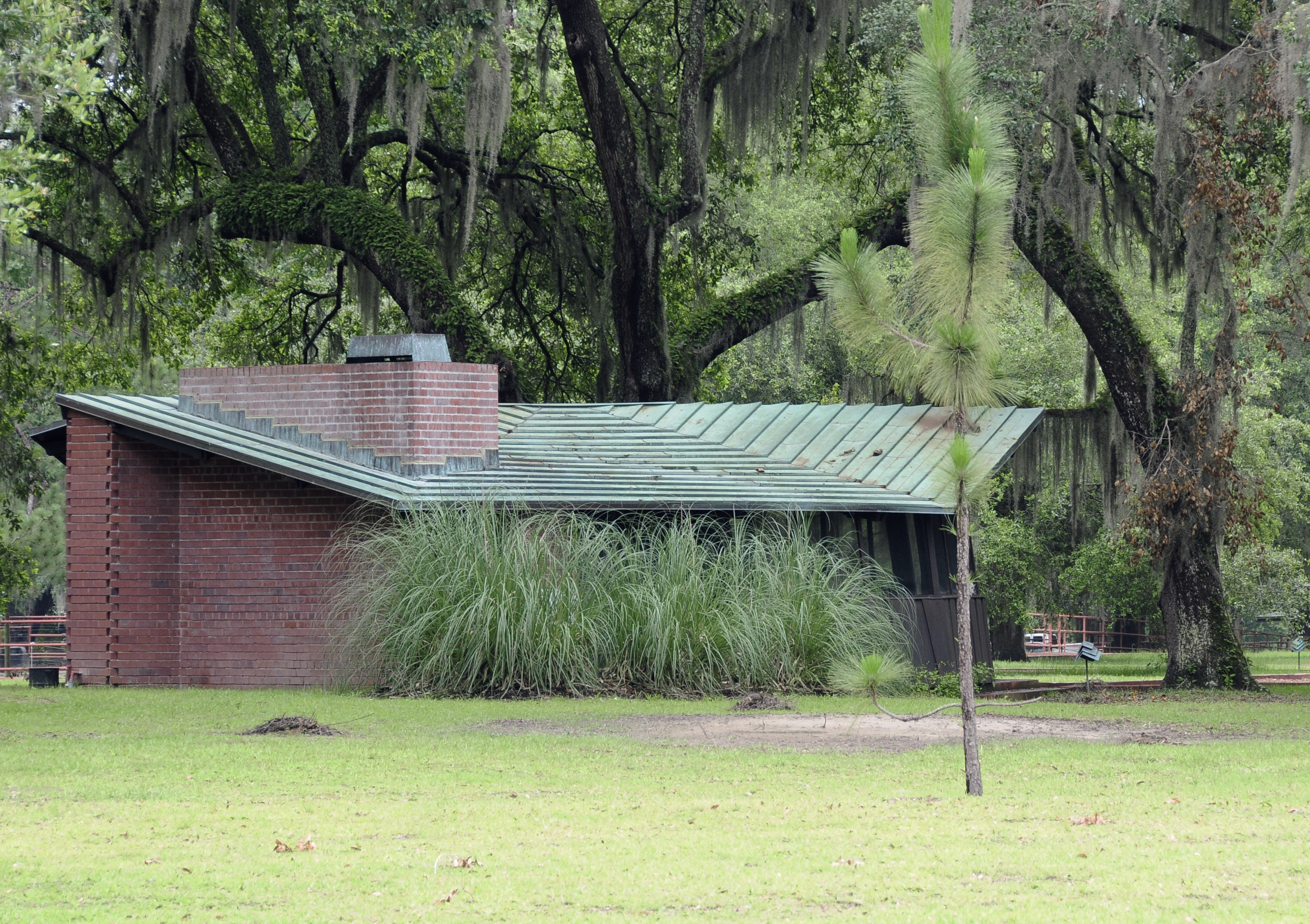
The plantation house as viewed from one side

The plantation house is located on the shore of a 25-acre (10 ha) pond. Wright had wanted the plantation house to be perched atop a slope leading down to the swamp, but he later found that he had misjudged the site. There is a low brick terrace in front of the plantation house, and the structure is surrounded by concrete terraces with hexagonal tiles. When Nina Stevens became involved in the project, she added an asphalt terrace along one side of the plantation house, which was removed during Silver's late-20th-century renovation.

The facade has slanting cypress walls, which are coated in creosote to give it a honey-toned hue. There are vertical brick piers behind the cypress facades, in addition to vertical windows that can open outward to let in breezes. The house has sliding glass doors with wooden frames; the original plans had called for canvas flaps to be installed through the house, but this was changed at Stevens's request. Aluminum blinds were installed behind the doors in the 1950s to deflect sunlight. During Silver's renovation, parts of the outer wall were relocated to more accurately reflect the original design.

At each corner are downspouts with abstract motifs resembling Spanish moss. The downspouts were supposed to be made of copper, but due to material shortages at the time of the plantation's construction, they were originally made of wood instead. There are also turquoise-colored wooden pendants near the downspouts. Abstract designs, likely inspired by Native American arrowheads, decorate the portions of the facade just beneath the roof. The clerestory under the roof has Native American-inspired motifs. The residence is topped by a copper roof with a blue-green patina resembling a tree canopy; originally, it was colored robin egg blue. The roof has overhanging eaves, which block sunlight in the summer and are supported by iron rods. There are wire screens between these iron rods, which enclose the terraces on the house's perimeter. The house's chimney has hexagonal motifs.

==== Interior ====
The floor plan is shaped like several overlapping hexagons, though sources disagree on its area. (Note: The plantation house is variously cited as having an area of around 2,400 square feet (220 m^{2}), 3,000 square feet (280 m^{2}), 3,328 square feet (309 m^{2}), or less than 4,000 square feet (370 m^{2}).) The exposed wood inside is decorated with the same arrow-like motifs as the facade. Wright designed the original furniture for the plantation house, which was constructed by John T. Lyman of New Jersey; additional furniture was designed in the 1950s by Edward Wormley. The furniture was made of wood and complemented the rooms' design and color schemes. They included angled sofas, a table with telescoping feet, a hexagonal ottoman, and hexagonal and rectangular tables. The built-in furniture was constructed at irregular angles to fit within the sloping walls. There are also built-in bookshelves, as well as storage space, which eliminated the need for dressers or drawers. The dining table could fit 24 people and could be disassembled when not in use. Wright bought carpets, draperies, and other fabrics from the Marshall Field's department store in Chicago.

The plantation house is centered on a living room that abuts a shaft with a brick fireplace. The living room has a concrete floor with hexagonal tiles, which measure 2 1/2 feet (0.76 m) long on each side, or 4 1/3 feet (1.3 m) apart between parallel sides. The floor is coated with a finish resembling leather, and protrudes onto the porch beyond the facade. There is a radiant heating system beneath the floor slab; the heating system is supplied by water from several 200-foot-deep (61 m) wells. Wood-and-glass clerestories surround the living room and full-height glass doors. Native American arrowhead motifs adorn the window surrounds and the fireplace poker. The masonry within the fireplace is arranged at irregular angles, and the fireplace's brickwork is separated by red horizontal joints and cream-colored vertical joints to emphasize the fireplace's horizontal dimension. The design of the living room's floor grid, central fireplace, and large windows were replicated in Wright's design for Broad Margin.

The plantation house's other rooms are also arranged around the living room's fireplace shaft and have irregular shapes. These rooms include a study, which later became a dining room; two bedrooms; and two bathrooms. Both of the bedrooms face east and have their own doors from the outside. Each of the rooms originally had a fireplace with a tall, shallow hearth to allow the fires to be built vertically. After the Stevens family sold the house, the hearths in some of these rooms were modified to allow larger fires. The original designs of the fireplaces were restored by Silver in the late 20th century. In addition, steel plates were installed in the bedrooms to reinforce the roof; these steel plates are covered by wooden boards, which also conceal mechanical equipment and ducts. Throughout the house are screens, which were originally intended for speakers but were repurposed to accommodate ducts for a heating, ventilation, and air conditioning system.

The original plans called for a kitchen in the plantation house, but the plans were subsequently modified so that the kitchen was located in a separate, connected pavilion. The pavilion kitchen was originally supposed to be a breakfast room before Wright enlarged the space into a full kitchen. The breezeway leading to the kitchen was originally an open-air space, but glass walls were installed during Silver's renovation to enclose it. There was a barbecue grill in the breezeway, which was later moved.

=== Other buildings ===
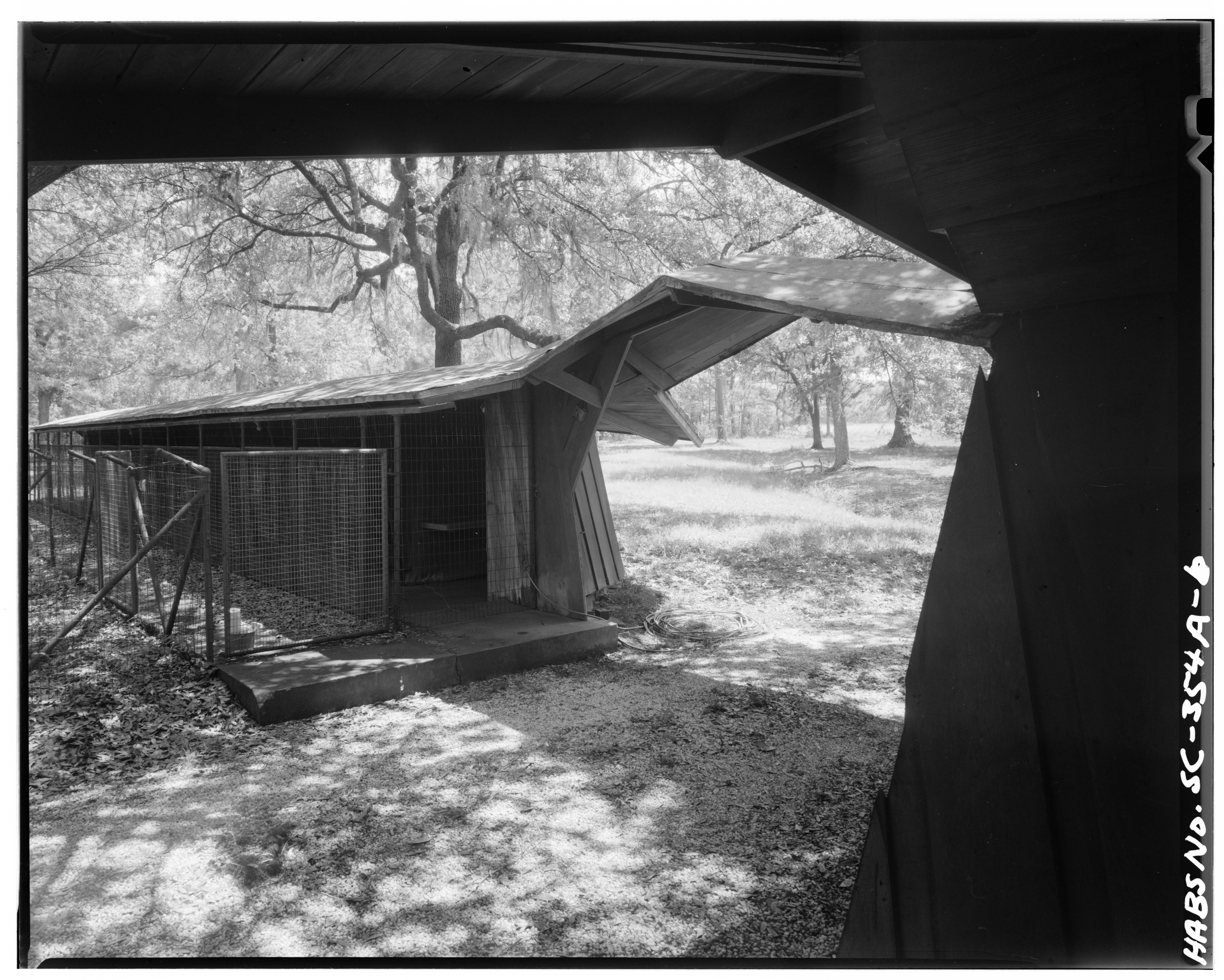
The kennels

Prior to Silver's restoration, the complex was cited as including a plantation house, a kennel, a stable, and three other buildings. (Note: The Press and Standard characterizes these three buildings as a manager's office and two caretakers' cottages, while The Island Packet described these as a caretakers' cottage, and two servants' cottages.) Two of the servants' cottages, a guesthouse, a swimming pool, a bathhouse, and a housekeeper's quarters were not built during Stevens's lifetime, while several other structures, including the stable and barn, were destroyed by the 1952 fire. As with the plantation house, the outbuildings all contain slanted cypress walls, in addition to furnishings designed by Wright. Except for the staff cottages, all buildings have walkways connecting them to at least one other structure.

==== Farm buildings ====
Running parallel to the plantation house is a cluster of farm buildings measuring 500 or 600 feet (150 or 180 m) long, linked by a single roof. The dog kennels are located at one end of the cluster. There were originally ten stalls, which were made of cedar; by the 1970s, the kennels had 12 stalls and three corrals. The kennels have slats for ventilation, in addition to foldable platforms where dogs could rest during cold weather. A cook shed and a saddle room intersect the kennels perpendicularly. The cook shed, also known as the gatehouse or manager's office, was originally used as a guest accommodation. The gatehouse is similar in design to the plantation house and has a large living room, a dining area with a kitchenette, two bedrooms, and a bathroom. The cook shed was never used for its intended purpose and continues to be used by staff in the 21st century. Meanwhile, the saddle room is used as an office and originally had gun racks and a liquor cabinet.

On the same axis as the dog kennels are a garage, and a caretaker's house, the latter of which has a hexagonal extension toward the shoreline. A workshop protrudes perpendicularly off the rear of the caretaker's house, surrounding the parking lot. The caretaker's house has a bathroom, two bedrooms with built-in beds, and a porch with a metal-pipe frame and wall screens. By the 21st century, the caretaker's house had a retractable projection screen in the ceiling, as well as built-in storage space on the outer walls. The caretaker's house is linked to the other farm buildings via a series of esplanades.

Beyond the caretaker's house is a henhouse, which had individual cedar stalls and small doors where the owner could collect eggs. Next to it was a horse stable. The stable originally had ten stalls and a tack room, which had been reduced by the 1970s to six stalls and a corral. After he acquired Auldbrass, Silver rebuilt the henhouse into a saddle room, caretaker's office, laundry, and two guest bedrooms. The original barn was next to the henhouse, at the opposite end of the cluster from the dog kennels, and it had a higher roof than the other farm buildings. By the 21st century, the rebuilt barn was occupied by a storage facility and a gun safe. Attached to the barn is a grinding house.

==== Staff cabins and guesthouse ====
The servants' cottages, also known as staff cabins, each cover 650 square feet (60 m^{2}). There were supposed to be as many as seven cabins in the original plans, but only two were initially built. The staff cabins face in different directions, and their roofs are raised at the front, descending almost to ground level in the rear. As designed, the staff cabins had a hexagonal plan with two rooms: a living–kitchen area and a bedroom niche. The living–kitchen area of each staff cabin had a built-in sofa, a sink, a table, hexagonal stools, and a narrow fireplace, while the bedroom niche had a six-sided built-in bed. Like the plantation house, the cabins were heated by pipes under the floor. The staff cabins also have canvas flaps. After Silver's renovations, the original bathrooms were removed, and the bedroom niches were converted to full bathrooms to accommodate guests.

The original plan called for the plantation house to be linked to a two-story guesthouse and a swimming pool, The guesthouse would have been built on an embankment projecting into the swamp, and there would have been a hexagonal barge for meals. That house would have included living and dining rooms on the lower story and bedrooms above. There were also supposed to be a gun room and a bathhouse in separate hexagonal pavilions, whose upper stories would have been connected by an overpass. The guesthouse did not have a fully-hexagonal floor plan. The guesthouse and swimming pool were part of the original plan but were not built during the original phases of construction. As part of a 1980s renovation, a tennis court and 135-foot-long (41 m) swimming pool were built near the plantation house. Several storage structures and a guesthouse, none of which were designed by Wright, were also built after the plantation's completion.

== Impact ==
When the plantation was being built, local residents took to calling it "the crazy house" due to its design; these remarks bothered Stevens so much that he prohibited visitors from entering or photographing the plantation. The Times Herald wrote that the plantation was "complete in every last detail, even to cedar-lined kennels", but that the site also retained its "somnolent charm". Gerhard Spieler of The Beaufort Gazette, who visited the plantation in 1976, described Auldbrass as "impressive and likable in many ways" even though he was a fan of neither Wright's work nor modern architecture. Another Beaufort Gazette reporter said that the plantation house "exuberantly breaks every tradition—not only of plantation architecture—but also of building construction".

The architectural historian Kenneth Severens said in 1981 that Auldbrass was not "merely a nostalgic re-creation of an antebellum environment, but its functional similarities with the traditional southern plantations are undeniable". Another architectural historian, William Allin Storrer, likened Auldbrass to a southern version of Wright's own studio, Taliesin. The State described the plantation in 1987 as "compact and efficient" despite the "crazy house" moniker, while The Atlanta Journal referred to the plantation as "decidedly anti-antebellum". In 1991, Josephine Humphreys wrote for The New York Times that, although she did not expect to see a Wright work in the Lowcountry, "Auldbrass looks as if it were meant for this flat Low Country landscape—and it was". Logan Ward wrote for the same newspaper in 1996 that the plantation was a "roadside incongruity", and another observer called it "one of the strangest anomalies in the region". A writer for Bluffton Today said in 2013 that Auldbrass was "a remarkable example of organic architecture adapted for Coastal Carolina's climate and environment". Alan Hess, writing about Wright's later work, described Auldbrass's walls as demonstrating "Wright's exploration of a new set of architectural forms and volumes".

Although the house was not well known outside the architectural community even in the early 21st century, Auldbrass has been the subject of, or a setting for, several media works. For example, Stevens's daughter Jessica wrote a book about the plantation's history in 1992, having researched the site's history for two decades. The architectural historian David G. De Long also wrote a book about the plantation's history and design in 2003, and Auldbrass was featured in William P. Baldwin's 2002 coffee table book Lowcountry Plantations Today. In addition, the plantation was featured in an episode of CBS News Sunday Morning in 2015, and an episode of the TV show Southern Charm was filmed at Auldbrass in 2022. Auldbrass's design also inspired Wright's onetime apprentice E. Fay Jones to design similar structures in the area, and its slanted walls influenced those of another house in Mount Pleasant, South Carolina.

== See also ==
- List of Frank Lloyd Wright works
- National Register of Historic Places listings in Beaufort County, South Carolina
