= Pope–Leighey House =

Historic house in Virginia, United States

- U.S. National Register of Historic Places
- Virginia Landmarks Register
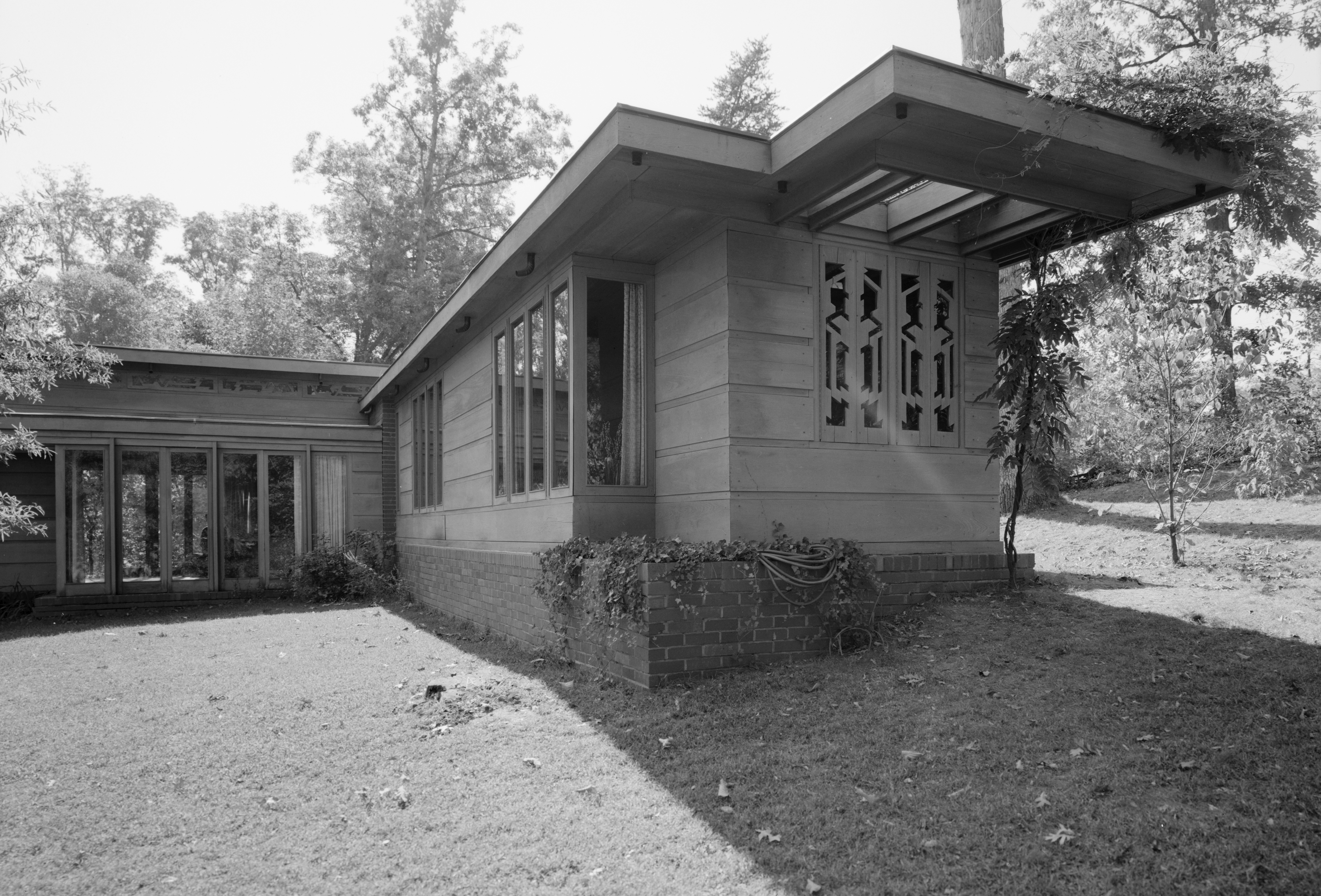

- Location within Virginia
- Location: East of Accotink off US 1, near Alexandria, Virginia
- Coordinates: 38°43′9.95″N 77°8′9.53″W
- Built: 1941
- Architect: Frank Lloyd Wright
- Architectural style: Usonian
- NRHP reference No.: 70000791
- VLR No.: 029-0058

Significant dates
- Added to NRHP: December 18, 1970
- Designated VLR: October 6, 1970

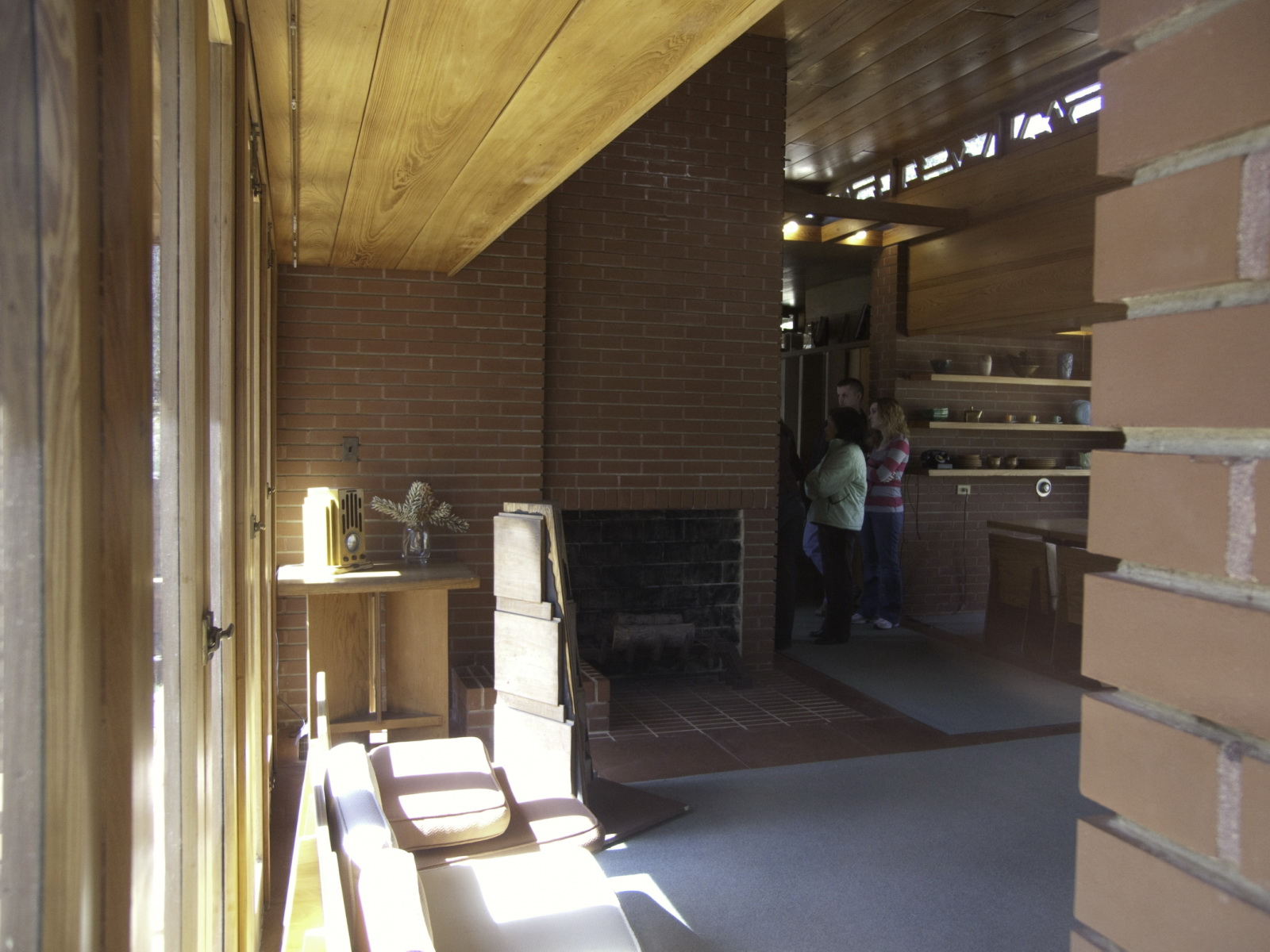
Interior of house, looking into the living room.

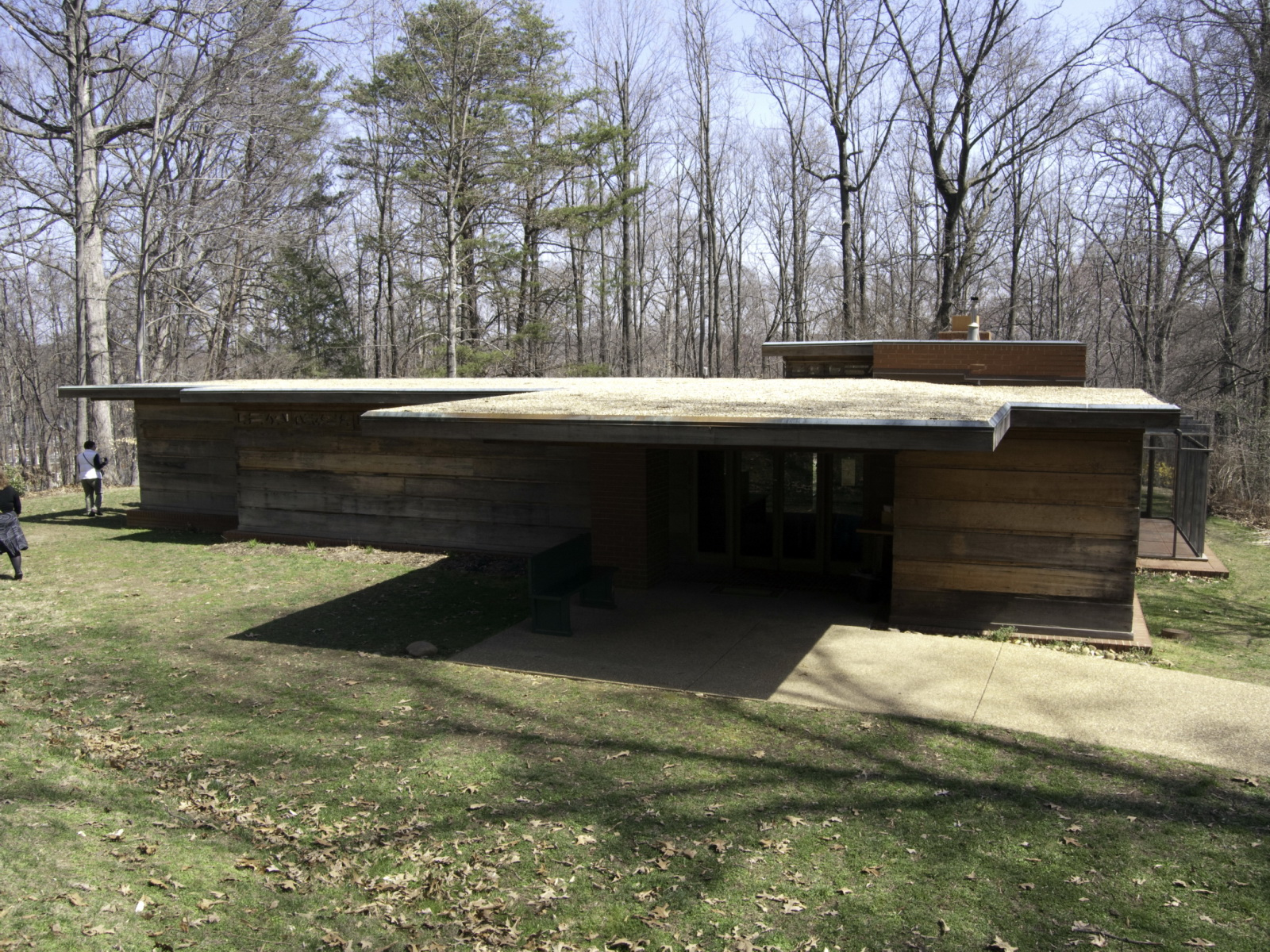
Exterior of house, with a view of the flat roof.

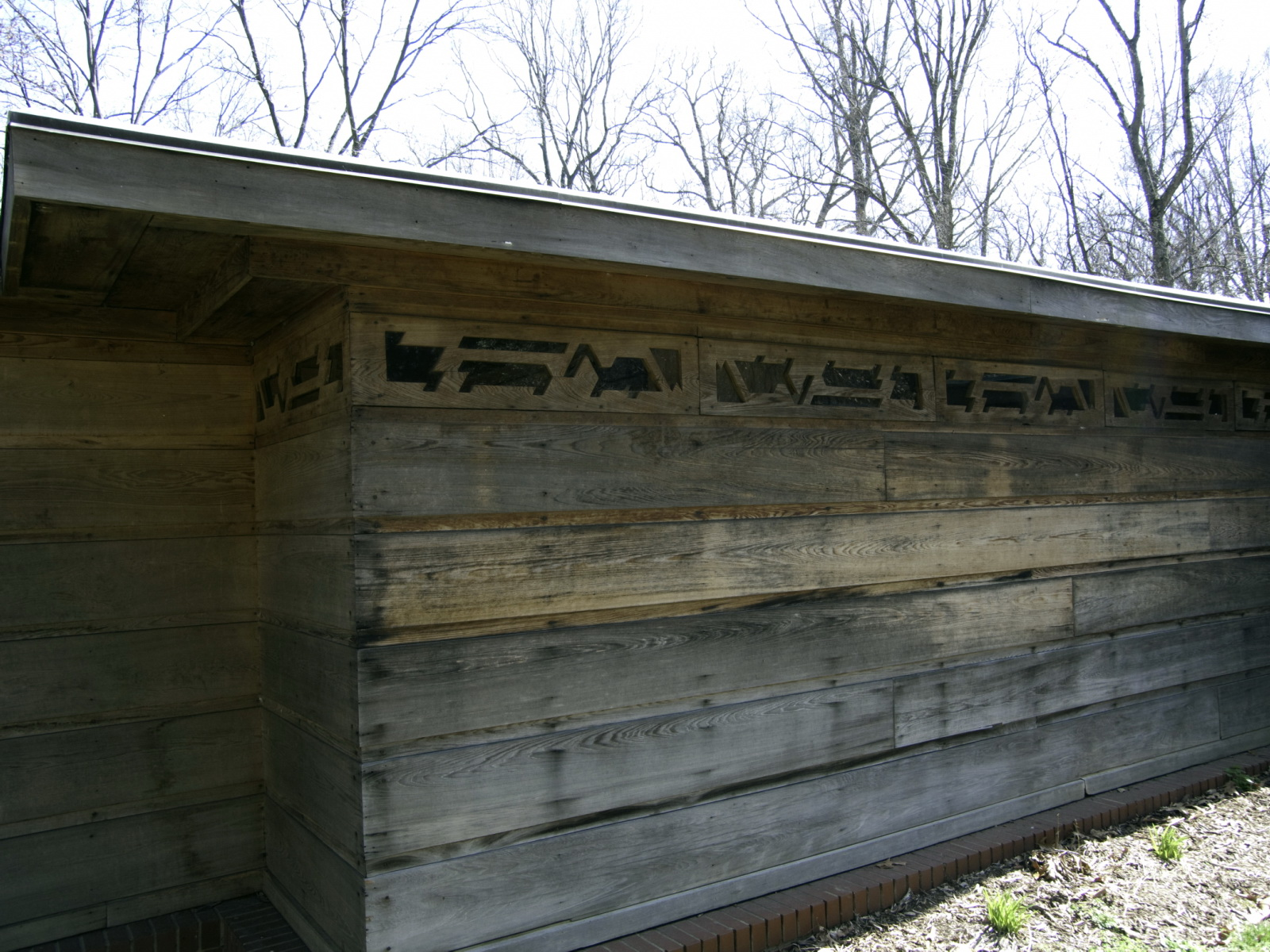
Exterior view of clerestory windows.

The Pope–Leighey House, formerly known as the Loren Pope Residence, is a suburban home in Virginia designed by American architect Frank Lloyd Wright. The house, which belongs to the National Trust for Historic Preservation, has been relocated twice and sits on the grounds of Woodlawn Plantation, Alexandria, Virginia. Along with the Andrew B. Cooke House and the Luis Marden House, it is one of the three homes in Virginia designed by Wright.

== Conception ==
Commissioned in 1939 by journalist Loren Pope and his wife Charlotte Pope, the Pope–Leighey House was one of the first Usonian houses designed by Frank Lloyd Wright. It was completed in 1941, located at 1005 Locust Street, Falls Church, Virginia.

Loren Pope had become interested in Wright after seeing him on the cover of a 1938 Time Magazine issue, which included an article depicting his work on Fallingwater. In the article, Wright expressed a desire to design homes for middle-class Americans, in keeping with his interest in using architecture as a tool for progressive social reform. Pope, as a middle-class American in the market for a new house, recognized this as a potential opportunity to get a Wright-designed home himself. At an architects' conference in 1938, Pope approached Wright after his presentation to inquire about the likelihood that Wright would design a house for someone like him. Wright responded that he only built houses for "people who deserved them" like middle-class families, noting that he would never design for those in the real estate business. Encouraged, Pope read Wright's autobiography, which made him so enamored with Wright that he became determined to contact the architect for a commission.

Pope wrote to Wright, telling him that "There are certain things a man wants during life, and, of life. Material things and things of the spirit. The writer has one fervent wish that includes both. It is a house created by you." Wright agreed to design a home for the Popes. Pope traveled to Wisconsin to visit Wright at his Taliesin estate to discuss the plans for the new house.

Pope was making $50 per week as a copy editor for the Washington Evening Star, and in his letter to Wright, Pope indicated that he was able to spend $5,000 on the house, which was significantly less than the typical cost of a design by Wright. Borrowing money for the house proved difficult, with one lender warning Pope that the home could be a "white elephant"—in other words, a property which would require a lot of money and attention without providing much profit in return. However, Pope was determined, so he turned to his employer for a loan. The Washington Evening Star lent him $5,700 for the project, to be taken out of his weekly salary. Mindful of the Popes' financial limitations, Wright scaled down the plan from 1,800 square feet to 1,200 square feet. The house ultimately cost $7,000, which was a remarkably low price for Wright design, but was in keeping with Wright's desire to provide middle-class Americans with accessible housing.

=== Style ===
Frank Lloyd Wright was one of the foremost architects within the American modern architecture movement. Although he was reluctant to ascribe his work to any particular movement, he had considerable influence over the evolution of modernism. Wright had achieved such prominence in the field that architects would gather around during the construction of the house in the hopes of glimpsing (or even taking) some sketches done by Wright.

By the 1930s, when the conception of the house began to take shape, Wright had acquired an image of an architect who designed houses for the stylish and affluent. Motivated by a desire to change this image, as well as by a sincere interest in social reform, Wright developed an architectural style specifically accessible to and intended for the American middle-class called Usonian architecture. As the United States began to grow rapidly, architects imagined what the future of the nation might be like, and explored how they could set the tone of the coming century through their designs. Usonianism was Wright's contribution to this movement. The Pope–Leighey House is a prime example of Usonianism, and Wright felt that it was some of his best work, even toying with the idea of naming it "Touchstone". The house features many of the key elements of Usonian architecture, including an L shape, a flat roof, natural building materials, cantilevered structure (particularly in the carport), and an integration of the outdoors with the indoors.

His interest in progressive reform aligned with the belief within modernism that architecture could and should have an impact on social issues. As noted architect Le Corbusier contended, the design and construction of buildings was "at the root of all social unrest," and there was plenty of social unrest in the early 20th century in America. Many architects turned to beautification and rational planning as a means towards progress, based on the idea that visual and structural beauty would contribute to better working and living conditions. Architecture was viewed as a mechanism for promoting progressive beliefs, motivated in part by pushback against corporate growth and landlordism. This development happened in tandem with the rise of working-class activism, particularly in big cities which were expanding as a result of commercial trade. Wright believed in this transformative ability of architecture, designing his houses with the intention of nurturing the lives of the middle-class people who inhabited them. This principle is demonstrated at the Pope–Leighey House in the attention Wright paid to every component of the Popes' lives there, down to the appliances, furniture, and decor.

One primary tenet of modernism was functionalism, which held that the form of architecture should follow function. This meant that the design of a building should revolve solely around its purpose, as opposed to any particular aesthetic, and that a complete concentration on function would inevitably result in beauty. Functionalism represented a pivotal shift away from tradition, which had previously held that the form of architecture should follow precedent. Wright's architecture mentor, Louis Sullivan, was famously a proponent of functionalism. Wright altered this principle by positing that form and function are one, thus arguing that both the purpose and the decor of a building should be taken into consideration.

Wright's attention to function and form simultaneously meant his designs were rational while remaining artistic and decorative. This can be seen in the design of the Pope–Leighey House, as noted by the house's primary carpenter, who remarked upon reviewing Wright's plans that the house was "logical." Wright wanted his designs to be practical, but was uninterested in purely utilitarian buildings whose appearance reflected their purpose and nothing more, as was often the case when following the principles of functionalism. Wright wanted to reimagine the typical box shape that house design had come to rely on—he was more interested in deconstructing the space so that it might flow more freely, allowing rooms to merge into one another and experimenting with ceiling heights. He felt a house ought to feel open but still protective of its residents. This philosophy was precipitated by scientific discoveries about the human psyche, which had caused architects to reevaluate the relationship of a building to the people inside it. It became important to consider in the design process how architecture would make individuals feel.

The house also reflects Wright's commitment to blurring the line between the indoors and outdoors. Wright believed that architecture should be integrated into its environment almost as if it grew naturally from the ground. He drew on inspiration from nature in much of his work, which can be seen in this house in the materials: the use of brick and wood made the space feel like "a rustic hide-out in the mountains," according to Pope. In recalling the draft plan for the house, Loren Pope noted that the "walls seemed to be only screens." Stars in the nighttime sky can be viewed from a spot inside the house next to the fireplace. The house's French doors open to unite the living room floor with the patio and the lawn outside. The landscaping around the house was also a part of the architecture. Wright wanted the house to evoke the sensation of "a happy, cloudless day."

=== Design ===
The house is in the shape of an L, a technique Wright often used to incorporate an outdoor garden space. At the juncture of the two wings are the entrance, a study, and the kitchen. In one wing, there are two bedrooms and a bathroom, and in the other, there is a space which functions as a living room, a dining area, and a library. The height of the living room space is 11.5 feet (3.5 m). The house is one story, but it has two levels to accommodate the natural slope of the land. The original plans had included a workshop, but it had to be removed when Wright downsized the design for affordability. The roof is held up by three brick pillars.

Glass, a building material typical of modernism, is featured prominently throughout the house. The French doors, along with a strip of clerestory windows, allow natural light and fresh air to enter the home. The windows have a unique pattern which create an effect of patterned light throughout the house. These windows, combined with vents and a concrete floor, enable natural regulation of temperature in the house without air conditioning, which was notably innovative at the time of design. There is supplementary radiant heating from hot water pipes under the concrete floor. Natural heating and cooling dependent on windows and radiant-floor heating is typical of Usonian houses.

The brick and wood used throughout the house are not painted but rather treated with clear wax, which accentuates their natural qualities. The floor is Cherokee Red, one of Wright's signature colors.

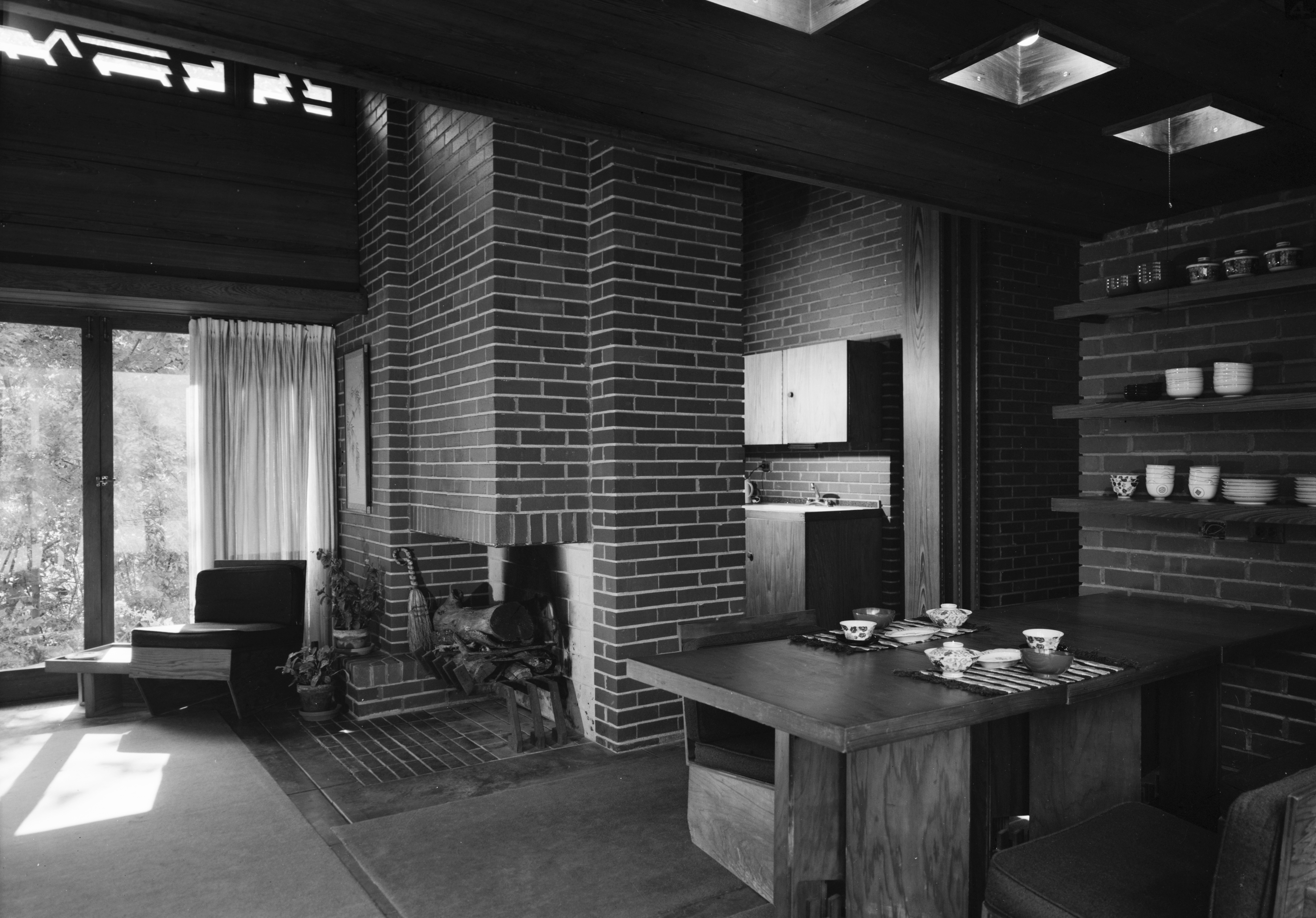
Interior view looking south, showing the junction of the living room, dining area, and kitchen.

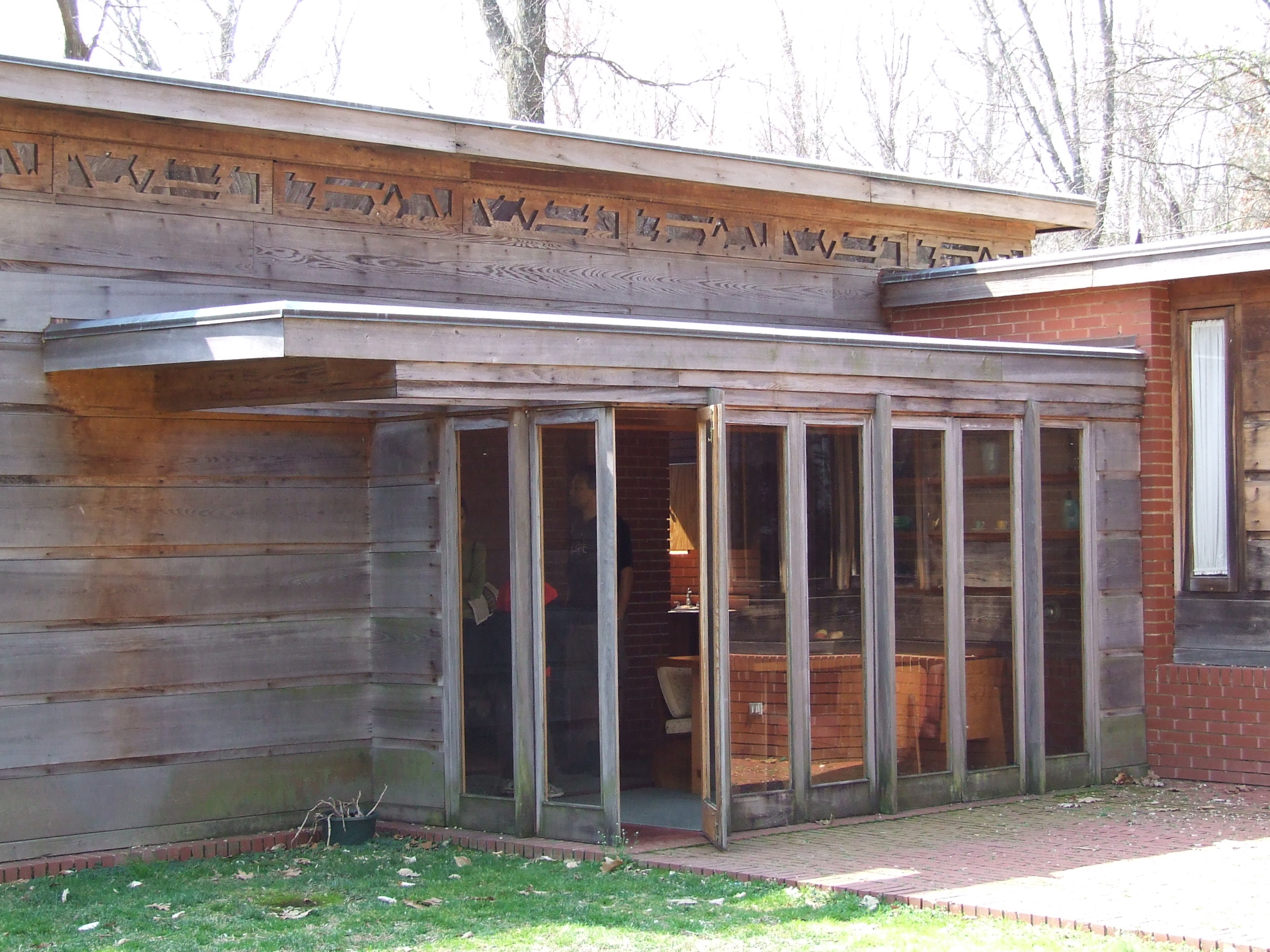
View of dining room through full-length windows

There is a cantilevered carport above the driveway. Cantilevered structures are a motif throughout Wright's designs.

The furniture was also designed by Wright, and was included with the property when the Popes purchased it. The furniture was designed as part of the house, which reflects the Usonian principle that housing should be rational and livable, not merely decorative. To Wright, the interior was just as important as the construction of the building, and thus furniture and appliances were part of his vision.

It was crucial to Wright that the interior and exterior of the house fit his vision exactly. When a magnolia tree that Pope had planted in front of the carport grew taller than the roof, Wright visited to inform him that he must cut down the tree because it interfered with the design. Wright also oversaw Pope's extension of the brick patio, admonishing him if he deemed the job too sloppy.

=== Construction ===
Construction began in 1940. Wright chose his apprentice of two years, Gordon Chadwick, as the general contractor who would oversee construction of the home. Howard Rickert from Vienna, Virginia, was the project's primary carpenter. Wright, who liked to be involved at every step of the process, visited the site of construction several times.

Usonian homes did not use stock materials, so every piece of the building had to be constructed on the site, including components like the windows and doors.

Once construction was completed, Wright felt that the cost of the house had become too high. Concerned about the Popes' ability to afford the house, and determined to stick to his Usonian principle of accessibility for the middle class, Wright never requested his final payment. Pope and his family moved into the house in 1941.

== First relocation ==
The Popes lived in the house for five years, but after the death of their young son and the birth of two more children, the Popes decided to move. In 1946, they sold the home to Robert and Marjorie Leighey for $17,000. The Popes moved to a farm in Loudoun County, planning to commission from Wright another, larger home on that land. However, Pope could not afford a new home until 1959, at which point Wright was already busy with the Guggenheim Museum in New York.

In 1964, the Virginia Department of Highways declared that the house would be condemned to make way for Interstate 66, offering a condemnation award of $25,605. Robert had died in 1963, leaving Marjorie to address the fate of the house herself. Marjorie refused the condemnation award, instead donating the home to the National Trust for Historic Preservation, who granted her the right to remain there for the rest of her life in return. The National Trust for Historic Preservation, with the help of the Secretary of the Interior, began a campaign to save the house from destruction, writing to the governor of Virginia suggesting that the highway might be rerouted. The proposal was denied, and the house was ultimately dismantled, moved, and reconstructed on another piece of property owned by the National Trust for Historic Preservation: Woodlawn Plantation, a 2,000 acres (810 ha) property in Alexandria, Virginia which was once part of George Washington's estate.

The house opened to the public as the Pope–Leighey House in 1965. Marjorie Leighey continued to reside in the home from 1969 until her death in 1983.

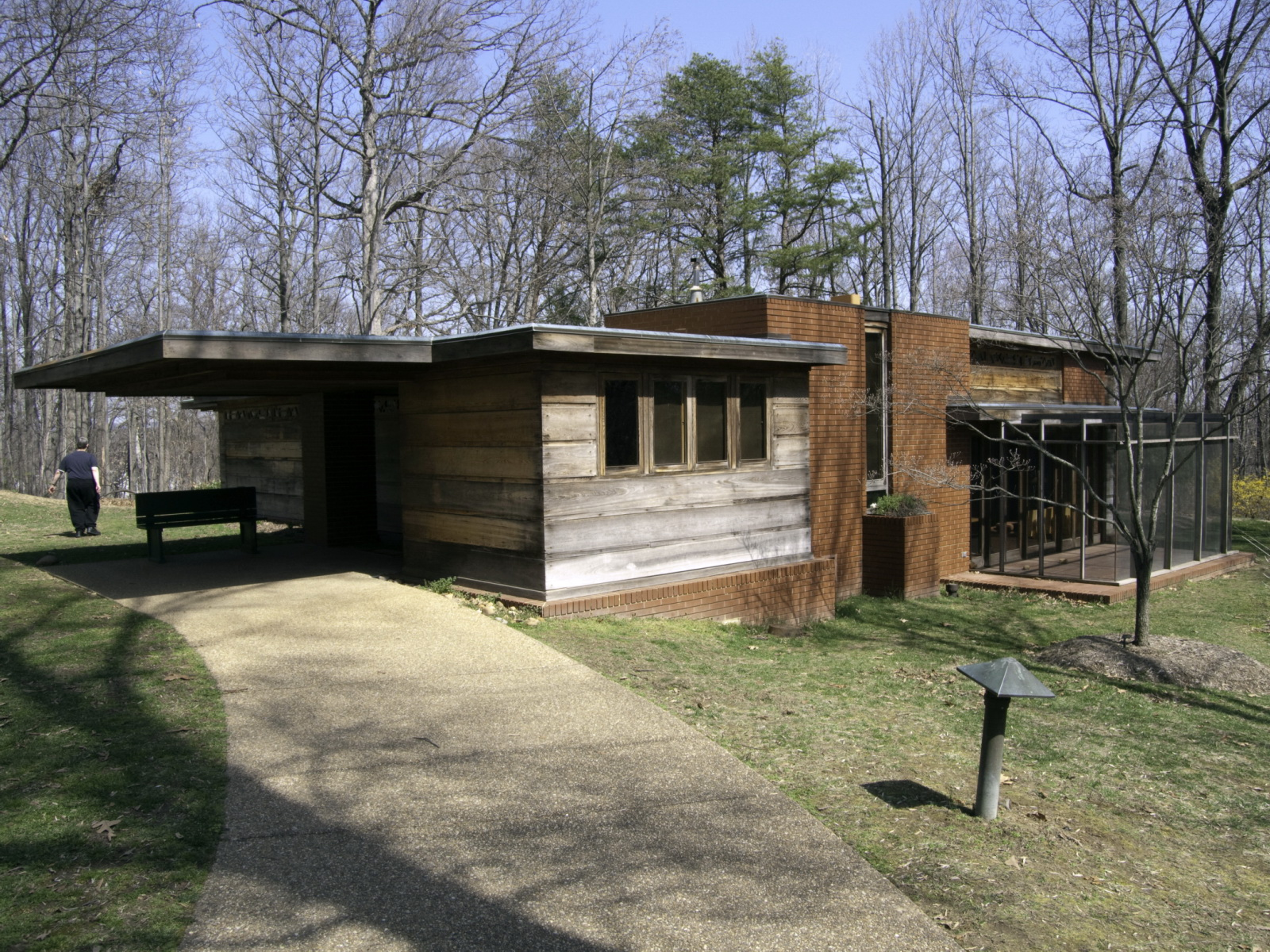
Pope–Leighey House at current location.

== Second relocation ==
The house's initial location at Woodlawn Plantation turned out to be on top of unstable marine clay, which was causing the base of the house to crack. In 1995, the house was again relocated to a spot only 30 feet (9.1 m) away, at a cost of $500,000. The house remains in that spot today, sharing a historical site with Woodlawn Plantation.

The National Trust has preserved the house as it was intended to be lived in, complete with original decor and furniture, so visitors to the house today can see Wright's Usonian vision.

== See also ==
- List of Frank Lloyd Wright works
- Andrew B. Cooke House, Virginia Beach, Virginia
- Marden House, Mclean, Virginia
