= McFarland Heights =

- U.S. National Register of Historic Places
- Location within Alabama
- Location: 501-920 Riverview Dr., 701-735 Pleasant Cir., 410-456 Riverview Cir., Florence, Alabama
- Coordinates: 34°47′32″N 87°40′57″W
- NRHP reference No.: 100001280
- Added to NRHP: July 10, 2017

McFarland Heights, a neighborhood in Florence in Lauderdale County, Alabama, was listed on the National Register of Historic Places in 2017 as a historic district.

According to the Alabama Historical Commission: "McFarland Heights Historic District in Florence, Lauderdale County, is located on a bluff overlooking the Tennessee River. The neighborhood developed as Florence's first exclusive suburban development. Built over a period of about 45 years, (1920-1966) McFarland Heights has a wealth of high style buildings, most of which maintain their historic integrity. The houses reflect the transition from pre- to post-World War II suburban American architecture, with one notable dwelling designed by Frank Lloyd Wright."

The Rosenbaum House is the Wright work.
