= Broad Margin =

Historic house in South Carolina, United States

- U.S. National Register of Historic Places
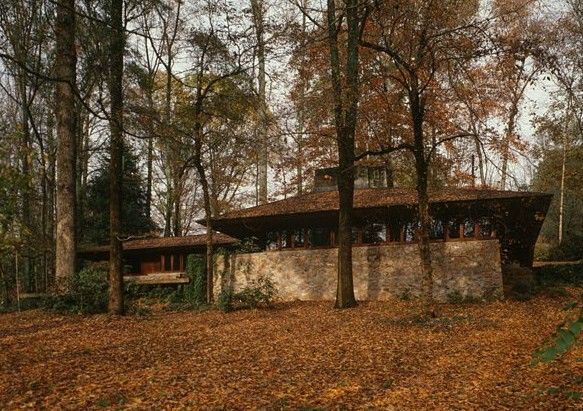
- Broad Margin in Greenville, South Carolina ca. 1987

- Location within South Carolina Location within the United States
- Location: 9 West Avondale Drive, Greenville, South Carolina
- Coordinates: 34°52′23″N 82°23′26″W
- Area: 2 acres (0.81 ha)
- Built: 1954
- Architect: Frank Lloyd Wright
- Architectural style: Usonian
- NRHP reference No.: 78002513
- Added to NRHP: December 8, 1978

Broad Margin is a house in Greenville, South Carolina, United States. Commissioned by Gabrielle and Charlcey Austin, it was designed by Frank Lloyd Wright and was built by Harold T. Newton in 1954. It is one of two buildings designed by Wright in South Carolina (the other being the Auldbrass Plantation).

It was named to the National Register of Historic Places in 1978.

The house is built into the slope of the 2-acre (0.81 ha) lot. It has 12-inch-thick (30 cm) concrete walls. It extensively uses cypress wood throughout including its ceiling of cypress boards. The house has polished red concrete floors. Copper tubes are embedded in the concrete floors to heat the house using hot water.

The cypress furniture was designed for the house. The doors and window frames were constructed on-site of cypress. The hardware is solid brass.

Broad Margin is one of a few Wright-designed houses where he signed his name on a block imbedded into the home.

The house was documented with photographs and written historical data by the Historic American Buildings Survey in 1988.

== See also ==
- List of Frank Lloyd Wright works
