= Andrew B. Cooke House =

House in Virginia Beach, Virginia

- Location within Virginia Location within the United States

General information
- Type: House
- Architectural style: Usonian
- Location: Virginia Beach, Virginia
- Coordinates: 36°52′38″N 75°59′22″W
- Construction started: 1959

Height
- Height: 3,000 sq ft (280 m^{2})

Design and construction
- Architect: Frank Lloyd Wright

The Andrew B. Cooke House in Virginia Beach, Virginia, was designed in 1953 and completed in 1959 for Andrew B. & Maude Cooke. Along with the Pope-Leighey House and the Luis Marden House, it is one of three Frank Lloyd Wright designs in Virginia. A variation of Wright's solar hemicycle designs, the Cooke House features yellow-gold brick and a copper, cantilevered roof.

In 1983, the original owners sold the house to Daniel and Jane Duhl. The Duhls sold the home for US$2.2 million in 2016 to an unnamed buyer.

== See also ==
- List of Frank Lloyd Wright works
