= Rosenbaum House =

Historic house in Florence, Alabama

- U.S. National Register of Historic Places
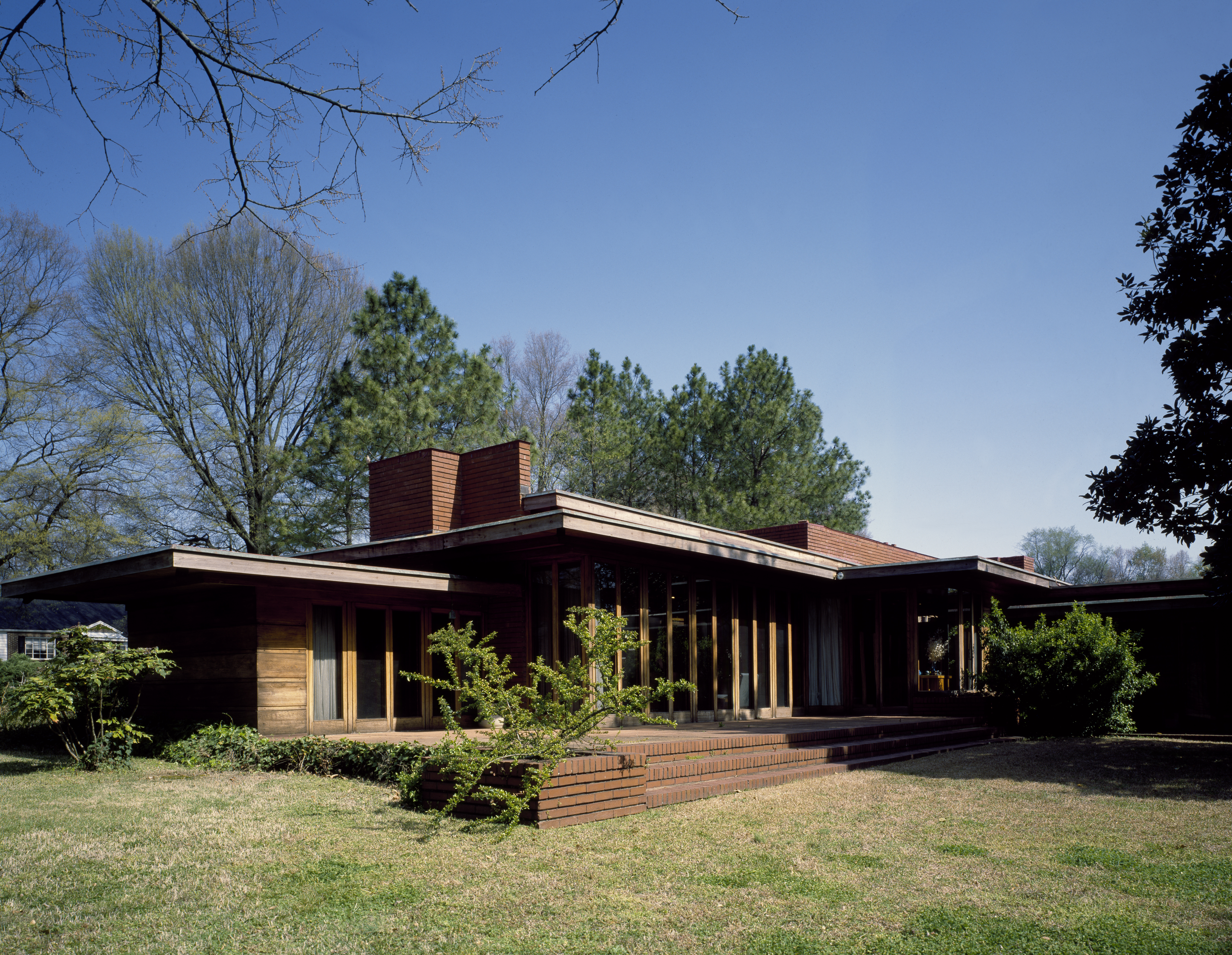
- View of the house from the rear.

- Location within Alabama Location within the United States
- Interactive map showing the location for Rosenbaum House
- Location: 601 Riverview Dr., Florence, Alabama
- Coordinates: 34°47′34″N 87°40′49″W
- Built: 1940
- Architect: Frank Lloyd Wright
- Architectural style: Usonian
- Part of: McFarland Heights
- NRHP reference No.: 78000492
- Added to NRHP: December 19, 1978

The Rosenbaum House is a single-family house designed by architect Frank Lloyd Wright and built for Stanley and Mildred Rosenbaum in Florence, Alabama, United States. A noted example of his Usonian house concept, it is the only Wright building in Alabama, and is one of only 26 pre-World War II Usonian houses. Wright scholar John Sergeant called it "the purest example of the Usonian." It is currently a house museum.

== History ==
In 1938 Stanley Rosenbaum (a professor at Florence State Teachers' College, now the University of North Alabama) and his new wife Mildred were given a building lot in Florence, Alabama and funds to build a house on it by Rosenbaum's parents. Both newlyweds had read Frank Lloyd Wright's autobiography and a cover story on Wright in Time magazine. They commissioned Wright to design and build the house; it is his only design in Alabama.

This is an example of Wright's "Usonian"-style homes, which he intended as low-cost housing for middle-class American families. But the first phase of the house ultimately cost $14,000 (equivalent to $320,000 in 2025), nearly double the wealthy couple's original $7,999 budget. The flat roof leaked almost immediately, the heating system failed, and the Rosenbaum family seldom used the custom furniture built on-site for the home.

After the Rosenbaums took up residence in September 1940, the first photographs of the house were exhibited the following month at the Museum of Modern Art in New York City. This house was also the childhood home of notable American film critic Jonathan Rosenbaum.

=== Restoration ===
The house was placed on the National Register of Historic Places in 1978. It remained in the Rosenbaum family until 1999 (when Mildred Rosenbaum moved into a nursing home). This was a longer period under the original owners' control than that for any of Wright's other Usonian homes. By this time the house was in poor repair, with extensive water penetration and termite damage.

The Rosenbaum family donated the house to the City of Florence and at the same time sold the furniture and contents of the house to the city for $75,000. The city spent a further $600,000 on repairs, using original plans in the Frank Lloyd Wright Foundation's archive at Taliesin West.

Following the restoration, the city opened the house in 2002 as a public museum, the Frank Lloyd Wright Rosenbaum House. The museum displays some of the original Wright-designed furniture. The restoration won the 2004 Wright Spirit Award in the Public Domain from the Frank Lloyd Wright Building Conservancy. Mildred Rosenbaum was the first recipient of the Wright Spirit Award for her tireless efforts for preservation and interpretation through the Frank Lloyd Wright Rosenbaum House Foundation. In her last five years in residence, which ended in 1998, nearly 5,000 visitors received personal tours conducted by Mrs. Rosenbaum, who died in 2006.

== Architecture ==
The Rosenbaum House was the first of dozens of Wright's Usonian houses based on the 1936 Usonian prototype Jacobs House in Madison, Wisconsin. The house was built on a 2-acre (8,100 m^{2}) plot at 117 Riverview Drive (now 601 Riverview, after renumbering), on the north bank of the Tennessee River. Built in an L-shape, the house is made from natural materials, largely cypress wood and brick, and features multilevel low-rising steel-cantilevered roofs covering both the living spaces and an adjoining carport. A distinctive feature of the house is its glass; USA Today described it as "blurring the distinction between indoors and outdoors." Most of the rooms have their own door to the outside. The center of the house is the "service core", built around a large stone hearth and adjacent to a 100 square foot (9.3 m^{2}) study.

The original Usonian floorplan provided 1,540 square feet (143 m^{2}) of living space, but when the Rosenbaums had their fourth child they asked Wright to design an extension to the now cramped house. His modifications, completed in 1948, added a further 1,084 square feet (100 m^{2}) in a second L-shape.

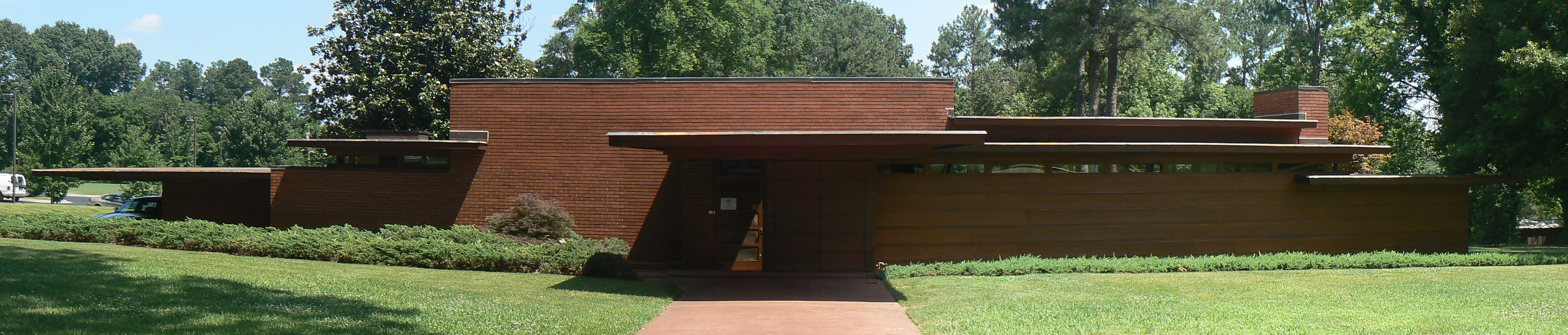
Street-side view of the Rosenbaum House. Two cantilevered roofs can be seen.

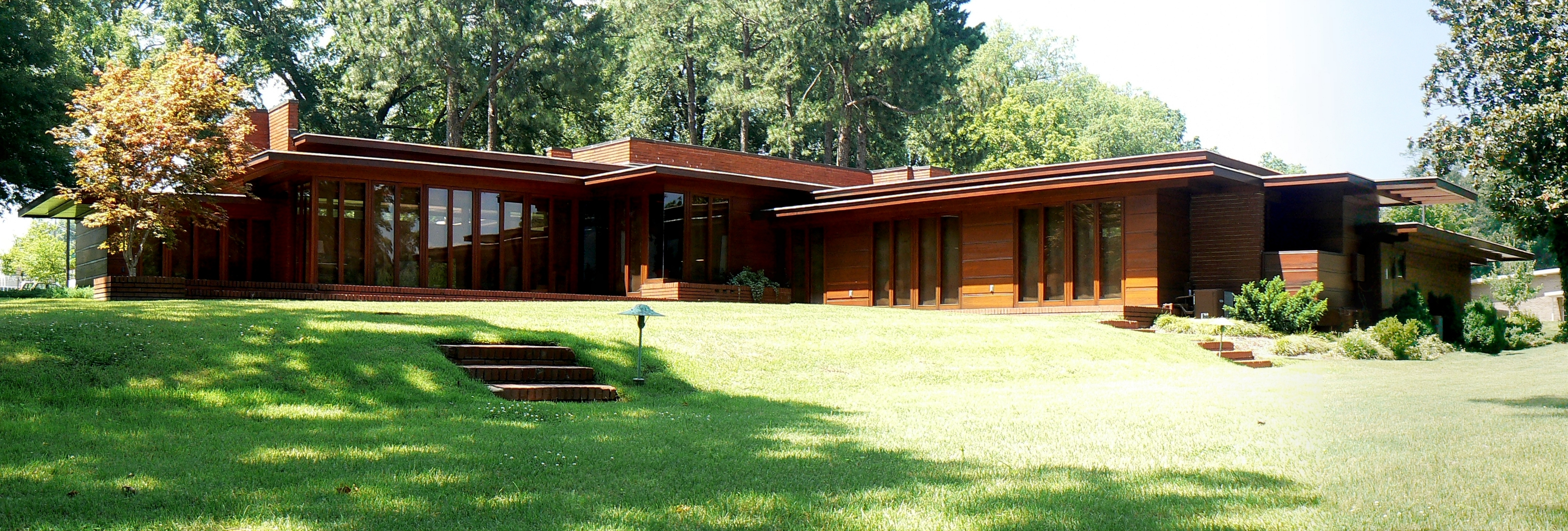
Yard-side view of the Rosenbaum House.

== Recognition ==
It is listed on the National Register of Historic Places individually, and also as a contributing building in the McFarland Heights historic district.

== Gallery ==
=== Photographs by Carol M. Highsmith ===
These photographs are from the George F. Landegger Collection of Alabama Photographs in Carol M. Highsmith's America, Library of Congress, Prints and Photographs Division.

Northern exposure, view from Grove Street.

Eastern exposure, showing the rear patio, next to the "bunk room".

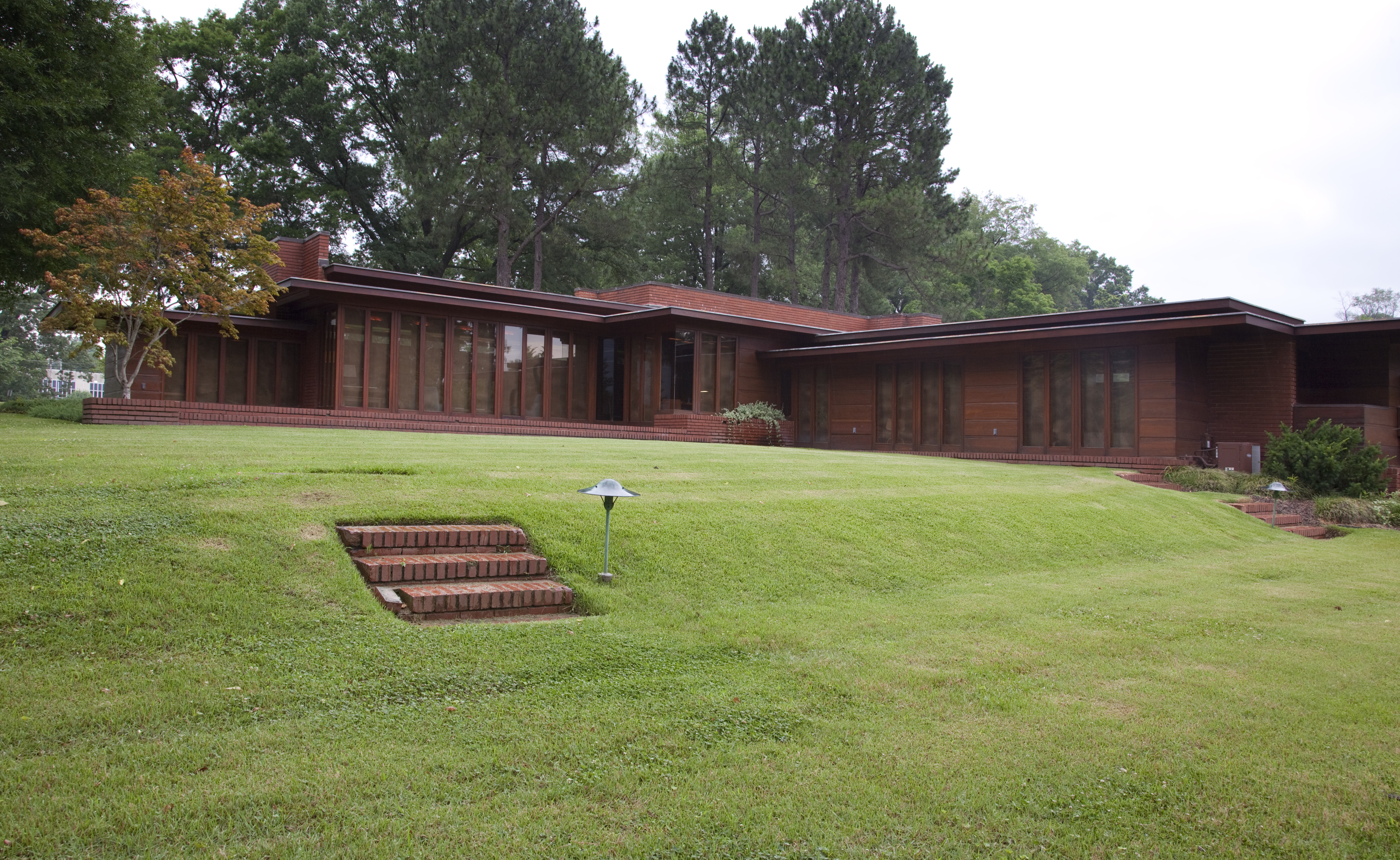
Southern exposure, view from the river side.

Northwestern exposure, view from Riverview Drive

Living room, looking toward the Tennessee River. Furniture designed by Wright.

Living room, looking west.

Dining room. Furniture designed by Wright.

=== Additional photographs ===
These photographs were taken after extensive restoration of the home in the early 2000s.

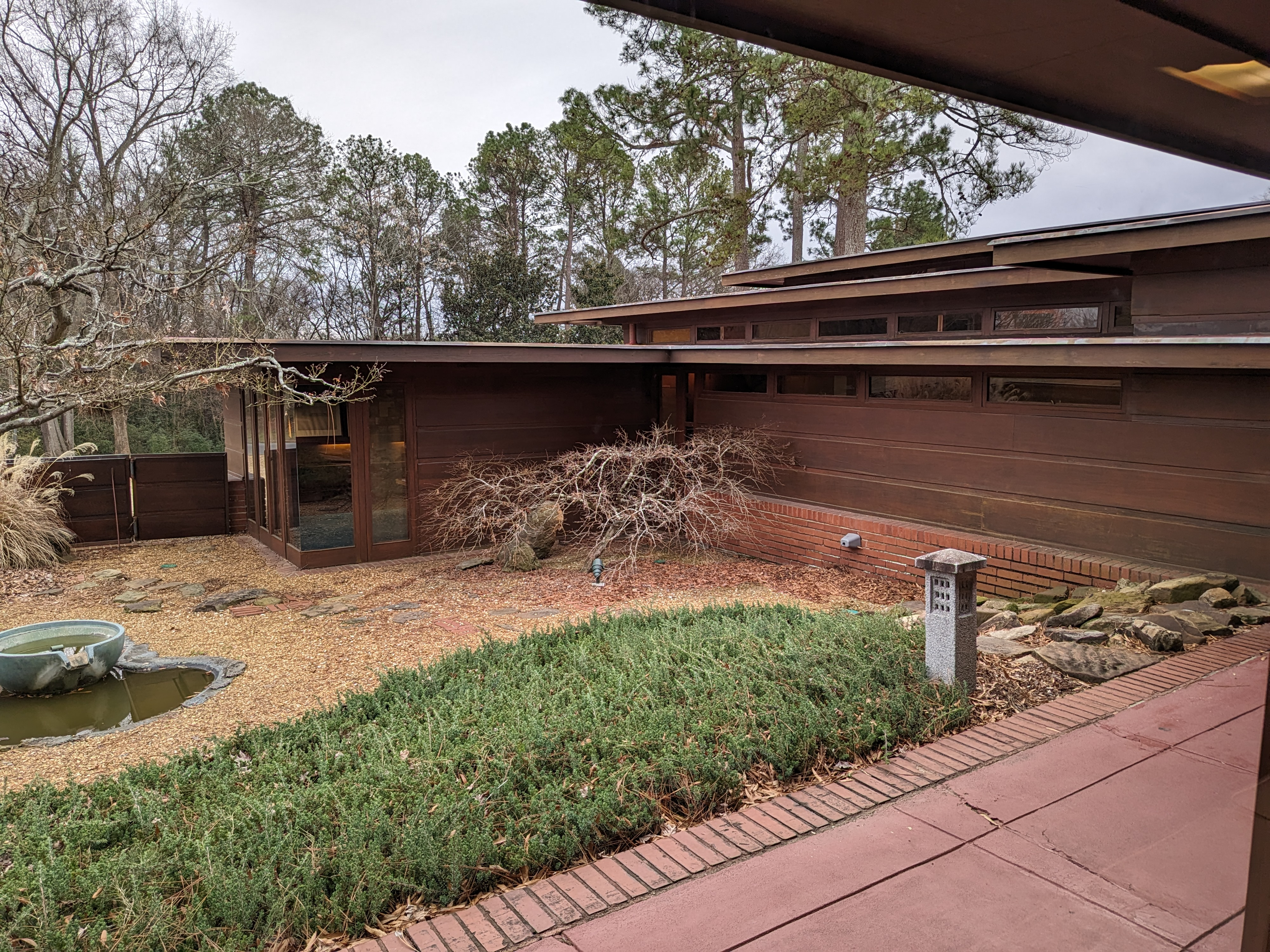
Garden created by the Rosenbaums and not designed by Wright.

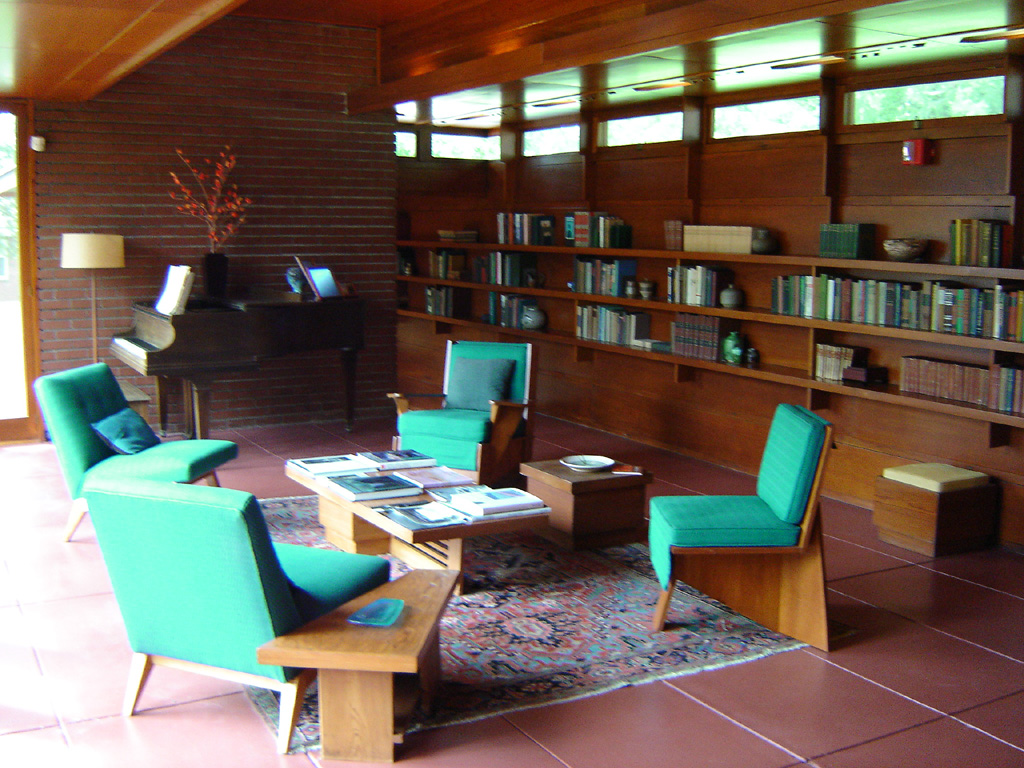
Living room.

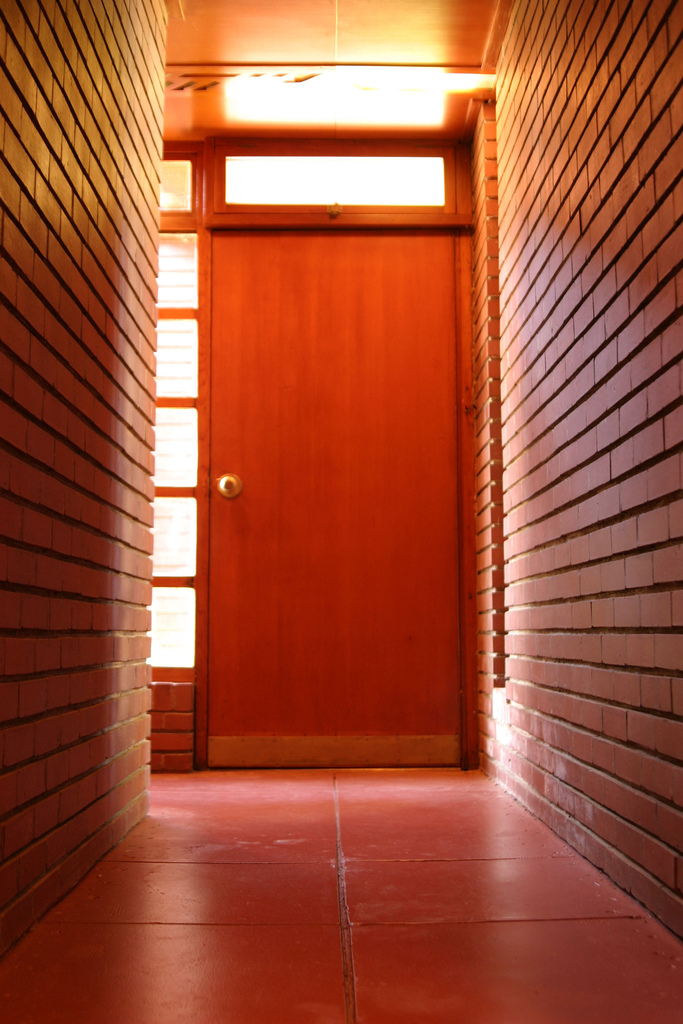
Front door.

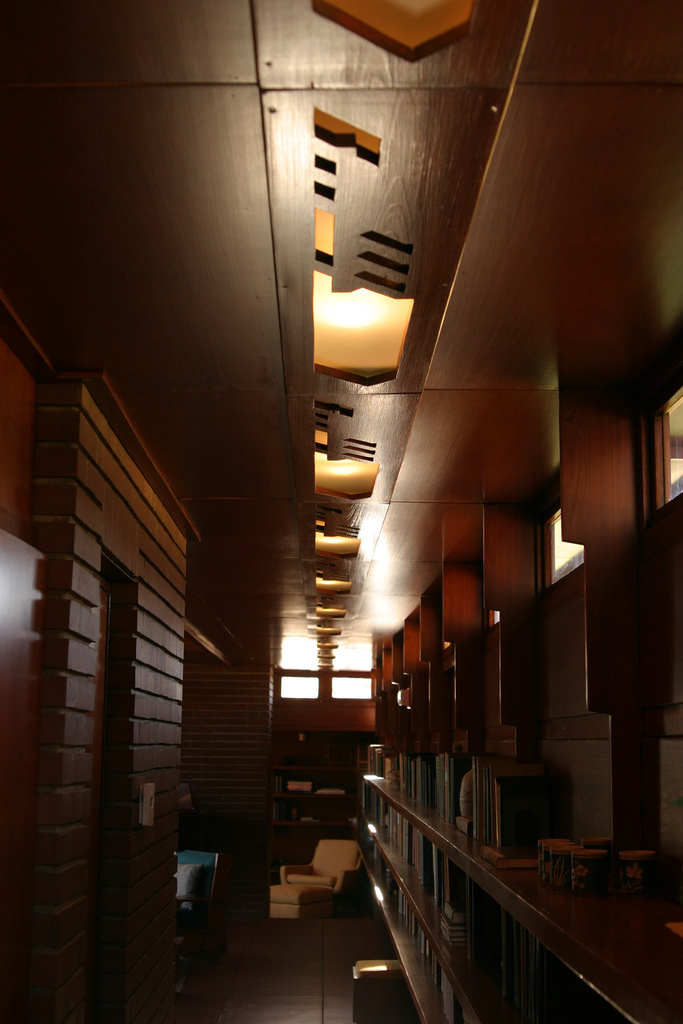
Hallway, featuring Wright-designed lighting.

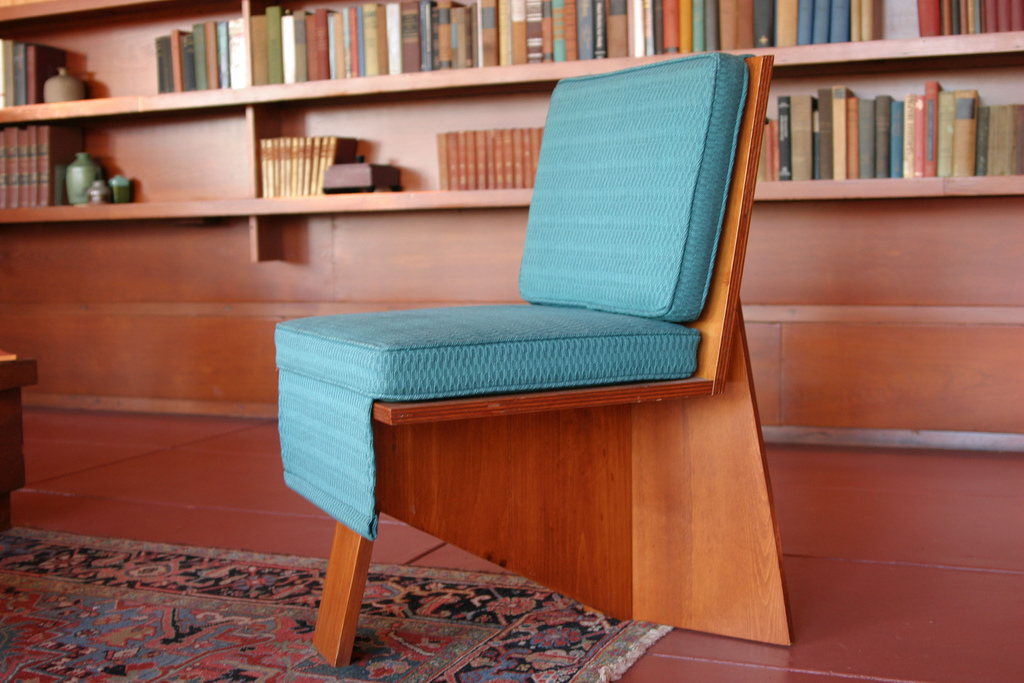
Wright-designed chair, constructed from plywood.

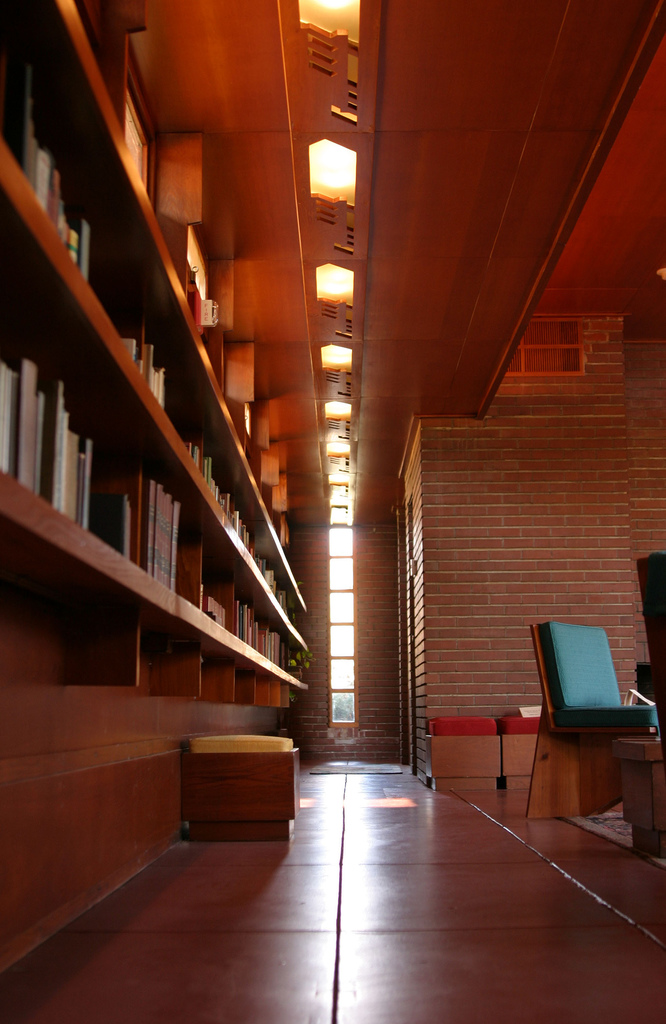
Living room bookshelves.

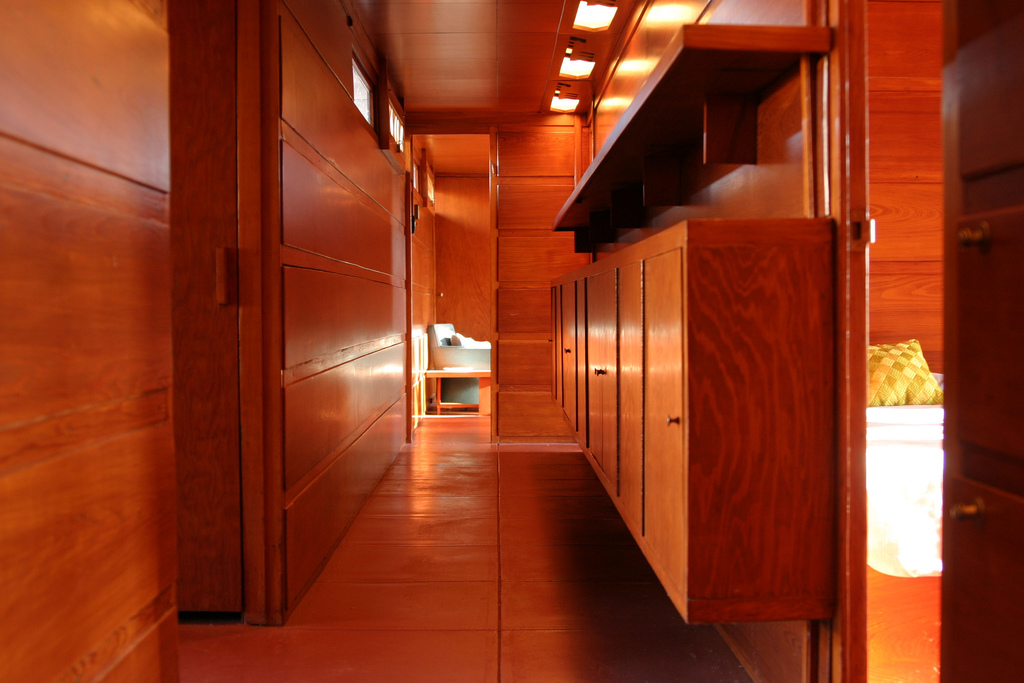
Hallway, showing storage cabinets.

== See also ==
- List of Frank Lloyd Wright works
- National Register of Historic Places listings in Lauderdale County, Alabama

== Bibliography ==
- Rosenbaum, Alvin (1993). Usonia : Frank Lloyd Wright's design for America. Washington, D.C.: Preservation Press, National Trust for Historic Preservation. ISBN 978-0-89133-201-5.
- Rosenbaum, Jonathan (1995). Moving Places: A Life at the Movies (2nd ed.). Berkeley: University of California Press. ISBN 978-0-520-08907-5.
- Storrer, William Allin (1993). The Frank Lloyd Wright Companion. Chicago: University of Chicago Press. ISBN 978-0-226-77624-8. (S.267).
