= Edward Wormley =

American furniture designer

- Born: December 31, 1907; Oswego, Illinois; United States
- Died: November 3, 1995 (aged 87); Norwalk, Connecticut; United States
- Occupation: Furniture Designer
- Partner: Edward Crouse

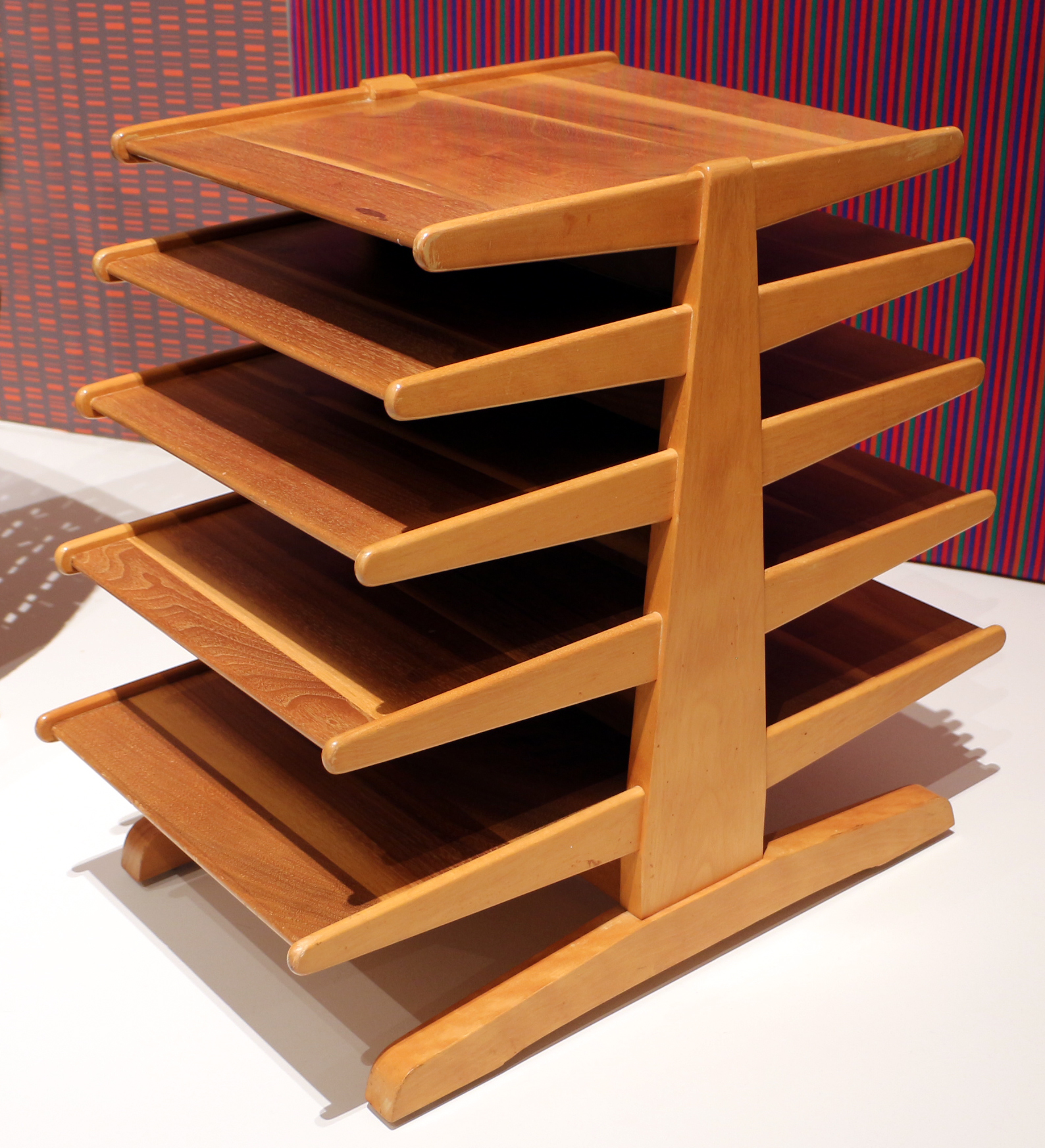
Edward J. Wormley for Dunbar Furniture, Tree filer (mod. 4765), 1947

Edward J. Wormley (December 31, 1907 – November 3, 1995) was an American designer of modern furniture. His furniture represented a convergence of historical design and 20th-century innovation that still appeals to contemporary collectors.

== Early life ==
Wormley was born in Oswego, Illinois. He contracted polio as a young child, resulting in a permanent limp. At twelve, Wormley moved with his family to Rochelle, Illinois, where he met Edward C. Crouse. The two became close friends, and began a sexual relationship as teenagers. They would go on to become lifelong partners.

In 1925, when Crouse left for college, he and Wormley maintained frequent and affectionate correspondence. They addressed each other affectionately as “dear heart," discussing "passionate encounters" and planning their future life together. Crouse wrote, "We'll have to wait, though, until we're (heavens, I almost wrote 'married'!) living together." Around Christmas that year, the young couple revealed their relationship to their families.

== Design career ==
In 1926, Wormley briefly studied at the Art Institute of Chicago but left after three terms due to financial issues. He began working as an interior designer for Marshall Field's. During the Depression, Homer Niederhauser, president of the Dunbar Furniture Company in Berne, Indiana, hired Wormley as a designer. There, Wormley designed two to four lines with 20, or so distinct pieces per year. He lived in Chicago, where one of Dunbar's exhibition spaces was located. His work over the next ten years made both him and Dunbar well-known and successful.

In 1942, Wormley became the head of the furniture unit of the wartime Office of Price Administration. After leaving in 1944, he founded Edward Wormley and Associates, a private design firm with Dunbar as its main client. In 1944, Dunbar decided to focus strictly on modern lines, and Wormley began incorporating European and Scandinavian innovations into his work. Instead of trying to be at the forefront of modern design, Wormley took elements from classical and historical designs and translated them into modern vernacular.

=== Good Design exhibitions ===
Wormley was included in the Good Design exhibit series staged by the Museum of Modern Art and the Merchandise Mart between 1950 and 1955 alongside designers like Harry Gitlin, George Nelson, and Charles & Ray Eames.

In 1950, three of Wormley’s works were on display at the Good Design exhibit: an adjustable upholstered wood armchair, a “Short John” coffee table with laminated wood legs, and a “Repartee” gray carpet. By the end of the Good Design exhibitions in 1955, 30 Wormley pieces had been awarded the Good Design designation.

=== Tables ===
Wormley's tile-topped tables, created as part of the Janus line in 1957 for the Dunbar Furniture Company, were a partnership between the modern production design aesthetic and the tile traditions of Tiffany and Otto Natzler. Dining tables, stacking tables, and other styles of tables manufactured by Dunbar were also popular at auction.

== Personal life ==
Wormley and Crouse continued their frequent correspondence through the 1930s and early 1940s. The relationship was unstable: Wormley was frequently insecure, and Crouse struggled with his sexuality. Crouse expressed disgust and despair, and spent periods "trying to be regular." Despite this, they shared a deep affection and went on long vacations together. They spoke freely about their sexual experiences with other men, and demonstrated that their relationship was still central to them both. By 1941, the two men were referring to each other as "husband" (Crouse) and "wife" (Wormley). Then in 1947, Wormley and Crouse bought a house together in Weston, Connecticut and remained there for the rest of their lives.

== Retirement and death ==
Wormley and Crouse retired from design work in 1967. The couple frequently traveled together until Crouse's death from cancer in 1975. Wormley lived until 1995, when he died following two heart attacks. He was buried with his parents in Oswego, Illinois.
