= The Beaufort Gazette =

Daily newspaper in Bluffton, South Carolina

- The October 27, 2006 front page of The Beaufort Gazette
- Type: Daily newspaper
- Format: Broadsheet
- Owner: The McClatchy Company
- Publisher: Sara Johnson Borton
- Editor: Brian Tolley
- Founded: 1897
- Headquarters: 10 Buck Island Road; Bluffton, SC 29910; United States
- Circulation: 5,923 Daily; 6,277 Sunday (as of 2015)
- ISSN: 1090-8285
- Website: islandpacket.com/beaufortgazette

The Beaufort Gazette is a daily morning broadsheet newspaper owned by The McClatchy Company printed in Bluffton, South Carolina, in the United States. The paper's staff works out of The Island Packet, where it is also printed.

== History ==
On February 13, 2020, The McClatchy Company and 54 affiliated companies filed for Chapter 11 bankruptcy protection in the United States District Court for the Southern District of New York. The company cited pension obligations and excessive debt as the primary reasons for the filing.

== See also ==
- List of newspapers in South Carolina
