= Marden House =

Historic house in McLean, Virginia

Coordinates: 38.93408°N 77.12037°W

The Marden House is a residence in McLean, Virginia, United States, designed by the American architect Frank Lloyd Wright. It is located just off Chain Bridge Road and overlooks the Potomac River. Also known as "Fontinalis", it is named after Luis Marden (1913–2003), a writer, photographer and explorer for National Geographic. It was designed by Wright in 1952 and was completed in 1959 at a cost of $76,000.

The location had caught Marden's eye in 1944 when he and his wife and had been fishing along the Potomac. After purchasing a plot of land, Marden continued the correspondence he had maintained with Wright since 1940, asking the architect to design a home for him. It was not until 1952 that the designs finally came.

After Marden moved to a nursing home in 1998, the house was purchased by Jim Kimsey, co-founder of AOL, in 2000 for $2.5 million.

== See also ==
- List of Frank Lloyd Wright works

== Sources ==
- Peter Beers: Luis Marden House 1952
- Annie Gowen (August 21, 2005). "The Wright Way". Washington Post Magazine.
- Christina Wilkie (May 2006). "Preservation . . . The Wright Way". Washington Life.
- Cheryl Weber (April 29, 2011). "Restoration of the Luis Marden House, McLean, Va". Architect.
- Storrer, William Allin (1993). The Frank Lloyd Wright Companion. Chicago: University of Chicago Press. ISBN 978-0-226-77624-8. OCLC 28676420. (S.357)
