= Bernard Schwartz House =

Historic house in Two Rivers, Wisconsin

- U.S. National Register of Historic Places
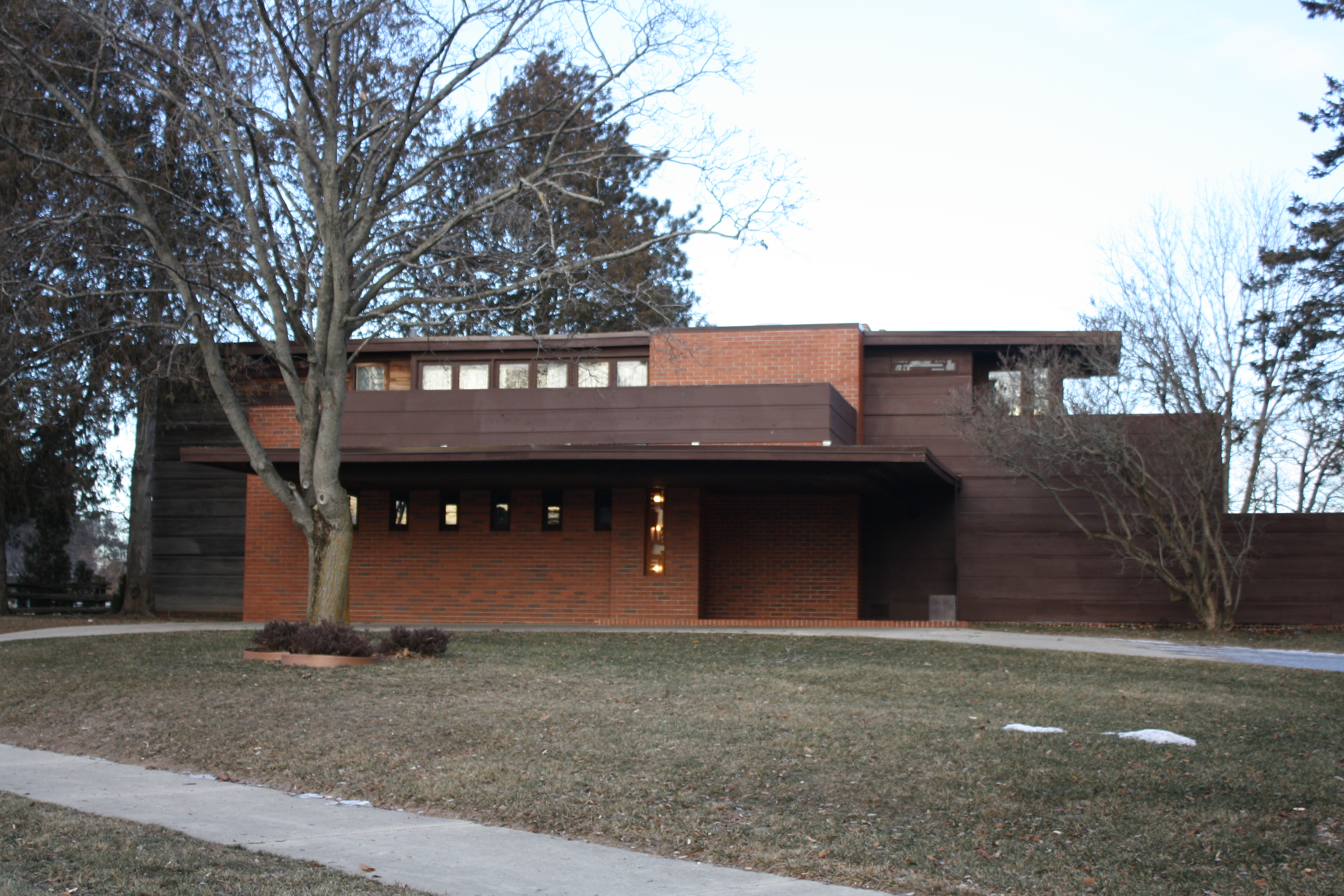
- Exterior of the house

- Location within Wisconsin Location within the United States
- Interactive map of Bernard Schwartz House
- Location: 3425 Adams St., Two Rivers, Wisconsin 54241, U.S.
- Coordinates: 44°10′00″N 87°34′35″W
- Area: 3,000 sq ft (280 m^{2})
- Built: 1939
- Architect: Frank Lloyd Wright
- Architectural style: Usonian
- Website: www.stillbend.com
- NRHP reference No.: 100003551
- Added to NRHP: March 28, 2019

The Bernard and Fern Schwartz House, also known as Still Bend, is a Usonian-style house at 3425 Adams Street, next to the East Twin River, in Two Rivers, Wisconsin, United States. Designed by Frank Lloyd Wright, the house was completed in 1940 for the businessman Bernard Schwartz and his wife Fern. The Schwartz House is one of two based on a 1938 "dream house" design published in Life magazine, the other being the Gordon House in Oregon. Over the years, the Schwartz House has received extensive architectural commentary and has been depicted in numerous exhibits, TV shows, and books. The house is on the National Register of Historic Places.

Life magazine invited Wright to design a modern-style house for the Blackbourn family of Minneapolis, who selected an alternate design. After Schwartz saw Wright's design in the September 26, 1938, issue of Life magazine, he asked Wright to build the design for him. Construction had commenced by October 1939, and the Schwartz family moved to their residence in June 1940, staying there for three decades. Paul Anderson bought the residence in 1970, and his wife Edie continued to own it until 2003, making various repairs. Jason Nordhougen and Terry Records bought the Schwartz House in 2003, and their friends Michael Ditmer and Lisa Proechel helped renovate it into a short-term homestay, which opened in mid-2004. Ditmer and his brother Gary acquired the house in 2006 and have rented it out on Airbnb since 2010.

The Schwartz House consists of a main section oriented northwest–southeast and a wing extending northeast. The exterior is made of red brick and tidewater cypress, interspersed with large glass windows and perforated decorative boards; there are also clerestory windows, overhanging flat roofs, and terraces. Adjoining the house are a sunken courtyard to the north and a patio to the south. The interior covers 3,000 square feet (280 m^{2}), with a radiant heating system, as well as tidewater cypress and brick decoration. The master bedroom, living room, dining room, and kitchen are on the first floor, while the other bedrooms are on the second floor; there is no attic or basement. Wright also designed built-in furniture and custom furnishings.

== Site ==
The Schwartz House is located at 3425 Adams Street in Two Rivers, Wisconsin, United States, approximately 99 miles (159 km) north of Milwaukee. It occupies the southeast corner of Adams and 36th streets, overlooking a bend on the East Twin River. The Schwartz House's nickname, Still Bend, comes from the name of the nearby subdivision and its position near the river. Next to the house, the river widens and flows through a marshy area. The Still Bend subdivision was platted out during the 1920s and became part of Two Rivers' city limits in 1955.

The Schwartz House occupies a flat land lot and is surrounded by other single-family residences, which are designed in the Minimal Traditional or Ranch styles. Unlike these other buildings, which are set back parallel to the street, the Schwartz House runs at an angle to Adams Street. A circular driveway outside the Schwartz House surrounds a landscaped lawn; this driveway is bordered with red bark. In addition, there is a sunken courtyard on the north side of the house and a concrete terrace on the south side.

== History ==
The house was built for Bernard Schwartz, a businessman from Two Rivers who manufactured dairy filters. Schwartz's family had emigrated from Russia in the 1890s, settling in Two Rivers in 1910. After Bernard married Fern Korn in 1936, the couple settled in Manitowoc, Wisconsin, and their only child Stephen was born in 1937. Simultaneously, the architect Frank Lloyd Wright had received significant press coverage after having completed Fallingwater, another house in Pennsylvania. Wright mostly designed houses for wealthy clients until the 1930s, when he began to design lower-cost Usonian houses for middle-class families. In general, his Usonian houses tended to have open plans, geometric floor grids, in-floor heating, and a carport, without a garage or basement.

=== Development ===
==== Life plans ====
In mid-1938, Life magazine invited eight architects (including Wright) to draw up "dream houses" for four families, each in a different income bracket. (Note: The families' income brackets and their respective architects are as follows: $2,000–3,000 (equivalent to $46,000–69,000 in 2025): Richard Koch and Edward Durell Stone; $4,000–5,000 (equivalent to $91,000–114,000 in 2025): H. Roy Kelley and William Wilson Wurster; $5,000–6,000 (equivalent to $114,000–137,000 in 2025): Royal Barry Wills and Frank Lloyd Wright; $10,000–12,000 (equivalent to $229,000–274,000 in 2025): Aymar Embury II and Harrison & Fouilhoux) Each architect drew up either a modern design or a traditional design for each family, for a total of eight plans. Wright was asked to create a modern-style design for a middle-income family, the Blackbourn family of Minneapolis, who owned a site on a hill. Wright described his design as "a little private club" with an open plan first floor, bedrooms on the second story, an enclosed patio, a flat roof, and an outdoor pool or sunken garden. The plan was based on his earlier design for the Storer House in Los Angeles. Meanwhile, Royal Barry Wills created a traditional-style design for the Blackbourns, which varied in height from one to three stories.

Wills's plans took into account the terrain and Minneapolis's snowy climate. Wills placed the living spaces in the rear to provide space for large windows at the front, overlooking a nearby lake; the steeply sloped roof allowed snow to slide off. By contrast, Wright's design entirely disregarded the climate and terrain, and one author wrote that the flat roof, outdoor patio, and glass walls were more suited for a flat site in Arizona. The Blackbourns ultimately selected Wills's design, despite reportedly expressing admiration for Wright's design. The eight dream house plans were published in Life magazine on September 26, 1938, and rapidly gained large amounts of attention. Several days after the article was published, the lawyer Eugene M. Lawton reached out to Wright, saying that the Schwartz family was interested in using his design.

==== Schwartz commission ====
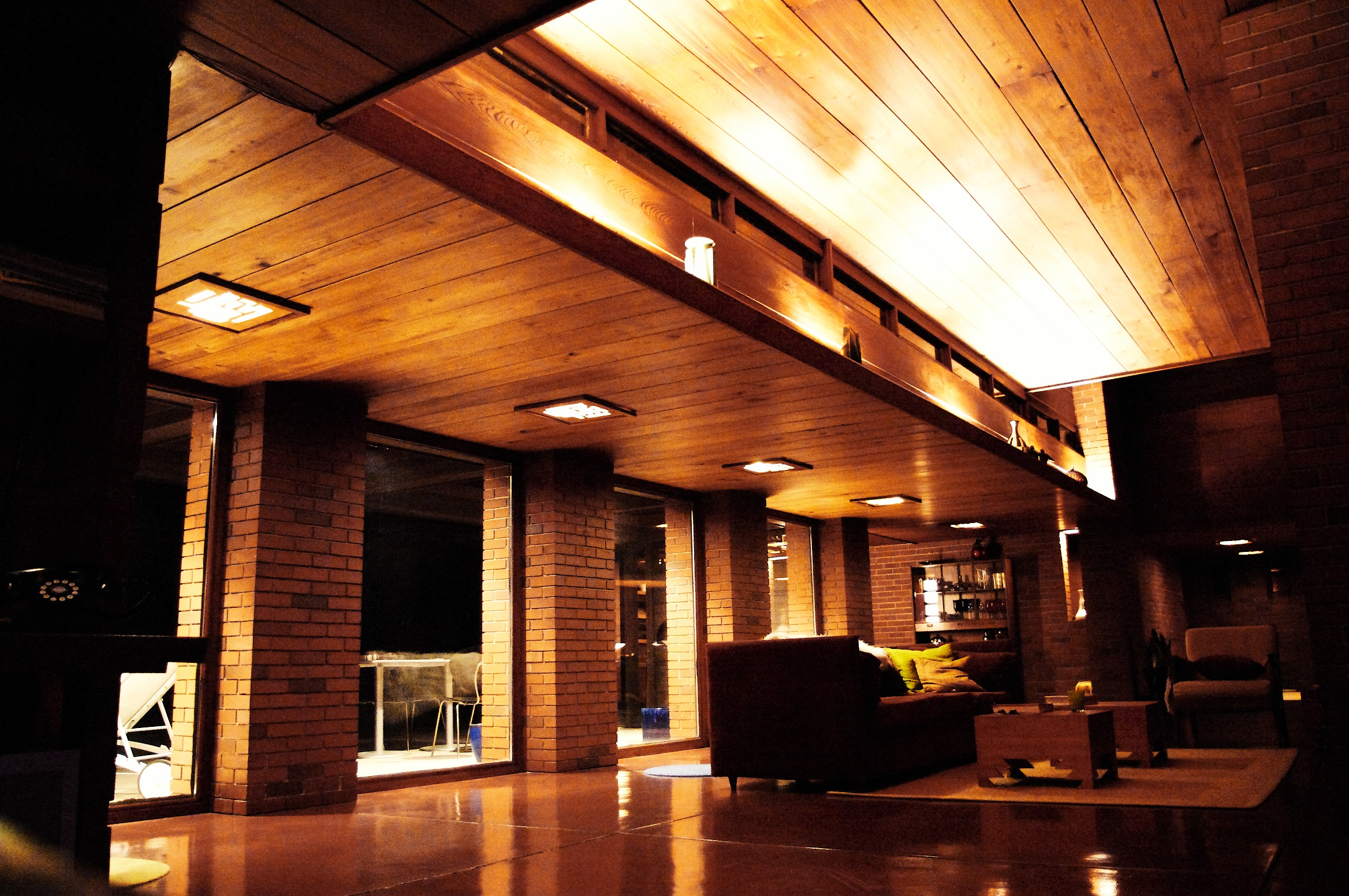
Interior of the living room

The Schwartzes first went to the architect's Taliesin studio in early October 1938, where Bernard asked Wright to construct his Life design for them. The family initially wanted to construct the house at 856 Hawthorne Terrace in Two Rivers, but that site did not have enough space. The Schwartzes' next meeting with Wright took place that December. Following this meeting, Wright's secretary Eugene Masselink informed the family that the preliminary sketches had been completed and that the site needed to be enlarged by 15 feet (4.6 m). Wright's apprentice Edgar Tafel attempted to acquire land from neighboring property owners, but Lawton had already agreed to buy the Hawthorne Terrace site for $2,600 and refused to spend more on land. As a result, the Schwartzes instead decided to build the house on the Twin River's western shore, slightly north of Two Rivers.

In April 1939, Bernard Schwartz again visited Taliesin to share drawings of the site, directing Wright to create detailed construction drawings and requesting a list of materials. A local builder, Bernard Pawlitzke, was hired as the general contractor. In addition, Egger's Veneer and Plywood Company was hired as the interior furnisher, Suettinger Sheet Metal was hired to build the roof, and Lahey and Watson were responsible for plumbing and wiring. Construction had commenced by October 1939, after the site had been leveled, and Tafel was appointed to supervise the house's construction. The Schwartz House's cost was initially estimated at $12,000 (equivalent to $278,000 in 2025). The brickwork was delivered that November. Documents indicate that the millwork was delivered in January 1940 and that the ceilings and roof were being built by the next month.

As work was underway, Tafel claimed that one of the 30-foot (9.1 m) ceiling beams was inadequately supported, though Wright asserted that the roof was structurally sound. Without Wright's knowledge, Tafel directed contractors to add a steel support beam and strengthen the cantilevered carport, and he replaced the plywood in the master bedroom with 2-by-4 wood planks. Schwartz was displeased with the extra steel cost, so Tafel explained them away as "minor job conditions"; according to some accounts, Wright fired Tafel when he learned about the beam, only to rehire him. Fern Schwartz and Wright also reportedly disagreed over whether to add a closet to the second-story bathroom. As a result, the closet door was ultimately placed next to the toilet, making the door impossible to fully open. The house was completed in June 1940; sources disagree on whether it ultimately cost $18,000 (equivalent to $414,000 in 2025) or $20,000 (equivalent to $460,000 in 2025). (Note: The $18,000 figure is cited in Sergeant 1984, p. 47, while the $20,000 figure is cited in a letter from Wright to Schwartz in 1941.) According to the Two Rivers Reporter, it was the 298th structure designed by Wright to be completed.

=== Use as private residence ===
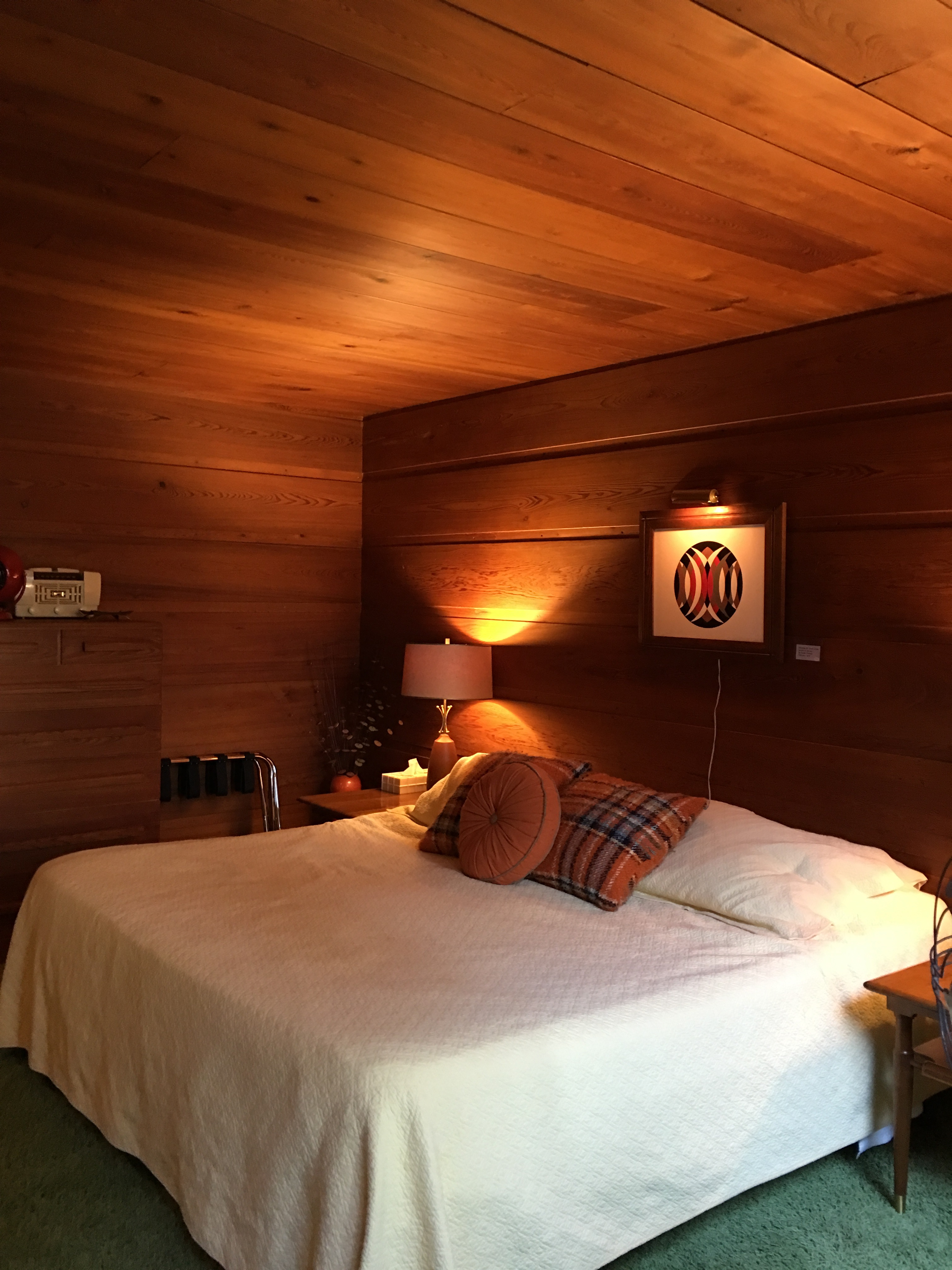
One of the beds in the house

When the Schwartz House was finished, Wright was reportedly proud of it. An article in the Two Rivers Reporter described Wright as saying that the house had "the best workmanship" of any Usonian house that he had recently designed. Wright claimed it had an "almost ageless quality" and rarely needed to be repaired, nor did he think there was a significant risk of fire. Though local residents criticized its design, the Schwartzes did not care for their opinions. Nonetheless, the Schwartz family wrote to Wright several months after moving in, asking him to modify several aspects of their residence. In particular, they thought the fireplaces were too smoky, and they wanted more heat, ceiling lights, and furniture. Wright addressed most of these issues except for the fireplaces, which could not be fixed until the chimney was expanded. He appointed his longtime mason Philip Volk to increase the height of the chimney; a mason named "Hans" ultimately carried out the chimney extension.

During the Schwartzes' ownership, the house hosted events such as Halloween parties and school field trips, and the family invited guests such as Wright and his wife Olgivanna (who first visited in 1941). Wright visited the Schwartz House again in September 1942 to draw sketches for several outbuildings, additional furniture, and modifications to the original building. The new outbuildings would have included a boathouse and pergola. Although Wright sent over the drawings to the Schwartzes that November, the structures were not built because of World War II and because Fern was concerned about such a large expenditure. The site became part of Two Rivers in 1955, and the Schwartz family repaired the roof in the late 1960s.

In 1970, the Schwartz family sold their house to Edith and Paul Anderson. Paul, the manager of a local real-estate firm, had bought the building because they liked the riverfront site and because the $30,000 sale price was affordable. The Andersons lived there with their five children. After Paul's death in 1977, Edie took over her husband's business. Edie Anderson (also known by her maiden name, Edie Schroeder) recalled that strangers periodically contacted her because they wanted to see the Schwartz House. According to Edie, her children often invited Wright fans inside when they were home. Edie replaced several of the windows and doors over the years, and she also fixed the roof.

=== 2000s renovation ===
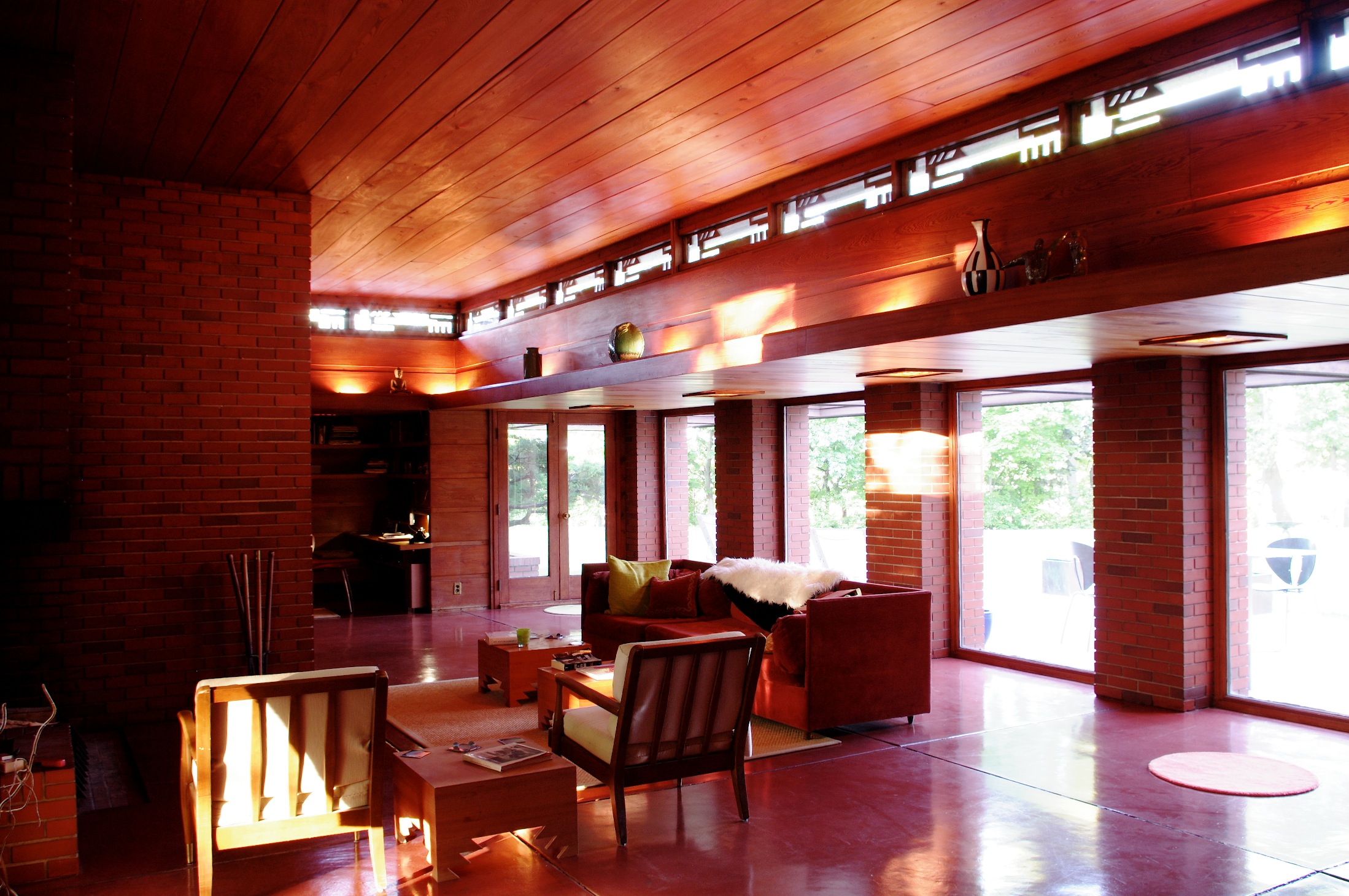
Interior of the living room

Jason Nordhougen and Terry Records of Minnesota bought the Schwartz House in September 2003, paying $315,000. Two friends, Michael Ditmer and his partner Lisa Proechel, helped renovate it. Ditmer had been a fan of Wright's work ever since he first visited Taliesin as a teenager, but he could not afford to buy a Wright-designed house, so he partnered with Nordhougen and Records instead. Ditmer later told the Madison Capital Times that he wanted to rent out the Schwartz House as a homestay, and he also wanted to buy several other Wright-designed houses for the same purpose. Bamco Architects was hired to help renovate the structure, Schaus Roofing and Mechanical Contracting was charged with replacing the roof, and Hoffman Bros. was responsible for other renovations. The Frank Lloyd Wright Foundation gave the restoration team the original plans for the building.

The renovation included cleaning the wood, rebuilding the utility room, and replacing some decorative features. Initially, the renovation was supposed to cost $35,000, but the renovation cost tripled after the restoration team found additional issues. The restoration team obtained replacement cypress boards from Florida because the material was no longer widely available in the Midwest. In addition, the team rebuilt the roof and the chimney. Records and Nordhougen furnished the interiors with props such as a phone, a radio, a desk lamp, and a copy of the 1938 Life magazine article from which the design was derived. They also displayed media about Wright there, including videos and books. The renovation ultimately cost $200,000. None of the original furniture remained after the renovation; instead, the house displays replicas of furnishings possessed by its previous owners.

=== Use as rental property ===
The Schwartz House was rented out to guests starting in May or June 2004. As of 2021, it is one of 11 Wright-designed residences where people can stay overnight; there is particularly high demand for Friday and Saturday night bookings. The building can accommodate up to six guests for a stay of at least two nights, with amenities such as books, games, and Wi-Fi. The building can also be rented out as an event venue, and it has hosted exhibits such as a showcase of mandalas. Tours are hosted once every two months, and there are educational programs about the house. The Schwartz House has been included in guided tours as well, such as the Wright and Like tour, the Symphony Holiday Tour of Homes, and the Along the Shore driving tour.

Initially, the Schwartz House was one of three Wright-designed houses being used as homestays, along with the Louis Penfield House in Ohio and the Seth Peterson Cottage at Wisconsin's Mirror Lake State Park. Two Rivers' city manager Greg Buckley described the homestay as a "marvelous opportunity", saying that it would attract international visitors to the city, and Ditmer described a stay at the Schwartz House as "living in a work of art". Visitation to the Schwartz House increased following a Wall Street Journal article about it, and there was soon a months-long waiting list to rent the residence. Though most visitors initially came from the Chicagoland area, renters also came from as far away as England and Japan. Proechel and Ditmer originally served as the caretakers. Michael Ditmer expressed satisfaction that visitors could use the furnishings instead of going through a line that "ends in the gift shop". The owners began hosting public guided tours in December 2004, and Ditmer and his brother Gary acquired the house in 2006.

The Ditmers listed the Schwartz House on the short-term-rental site Airbnb in 2010. It was being rented out for half the year by then, with about 600 guests annually; its guestbook included signatures from visitors around the world. According to Michael Ditmer, guests generally treated the building respectfully, since visitors tended to be architecture enthusiasts and experts. The Ditmers wanted to rebuild the sunken courtyard to the north and planned to reconstruct the original furniture. For the house's 75th anniversary in 2015, the Ditmers commissioned a floor lamp that Wright had drawn up for it. By the mid-2010s, the building was rented 70% of the time, and the owners earned over $100,000 annually from rent, which amounted to $425 a night. The Schwartz House was nominated to the National Register of Historic Places in 2018 and formally added in March 2019. By that year, Michael Ditmer planned to install replica French doors in the northeast wing, and he wanted to restore the patio.

The Schwartz House had become the most popular Airbnb homestay in Wisconsin by the late 2010s. The Post-Crescent wrote in 2019 that guests generally reviewed it positively, giving it a five-star average rating on Airbnb. The house was being rented out for as much as $995 per night by the early 2020s. It also hosted events such as a 2026 concert by the cellist Mike Block.

== Architecture ==
The Schwartz House is one of a few double-story Usonian houses designed by Frank Lloyd Wright, whose Usonian buildings were generally one story high. Its layout is based on a plan that Wright created for Life magazine in 1938, which in turn was based on Wright's plan for the Storer House in Los Angeles. The Schwartz House is one of two derived directly from the Life plan, the other being the Gordon House in Silverton, Oregon (completed 1963). The Schwartz House's final design deviates slightly from the Life plan.

The Schwartz House is variously described as being shaped like the letter "L", the letter "T", or two interlocking rectangles. The main house is oriented northwest–southeast, and there is a wing extending northeast. The main house is two stories high, while the northeast wing is one and a half stories high. The diagonal orientation, intended to maximize views and sunlight exposure, was also used in other Usonian structures like the John Clarence Pew House. Four materials were used in the Schwartz House's construction: cypress, brick, glass, and concrete. One writer characterized the Schwartz House as having a "polliwog-type" design, a name given to Usonian houses with "L"- or "T"-shaped plans that resembled the layout of the Herbert and Katherine Jacobs First House in Madison.

=== Exterior ===
The exterior is made of red brick and tidewater cypress, interspersed with large glass windows. The house's red brick came from the city of Streator, Illinois. Perforated decorative boards are used throughout. Wright designed the cutouts in the boards, which created a similar decorative effect to the art glass used in some of Wright's other buildings. Wright's apprentice Edgar Tafel described the walls as "skimpy" and measuring 3 inches (76 mm) thick, and he added studwork to the curtain wall to insulate the building. The windows kept cold air out during the winter, and they were opened during the summer to let in air. There are also clerestories, overhanging flat roofs, and terraces cantilevered off the facade. The flat roofs were originally made of coal tar and pea gravel; they were later resurfaced in rubber, then replaced in the 2000s with asphalt-and-gravel roofs. Like other Usonian houses, the building has no attic or basement.

==== Main house ====
On the first story of the house's southwestern elevation are six rectangular windows and a perforated board; the main entrance is placed behind this board. Instead of a garage, there is a carport, covered by a cantilevered canopy extending above the first story. The front door is hidden behind a wall. Above the first floor, the center of the southwestern elevation's second floor has three French doors. hidden behind a railing with wooden boards and battens. There is a plate glass window to the left of the French doors, in addition to a brick wall, door, narrow window, and perforated board to the right. A one-story-high wall, made of boards and battens, extends off both ends of the facade's southwestern elevation. In front of the residence is a 5.5-foot-high (1.7 m) board-and-batten privacy wall with a walkway behind it.

A one-story utility room—which has a board-and-batten facade and a perforated board—protrudes from the southeastern elevation. Behind the utility room, the first story of the house's southeastern elevation has a door and several small windows. The second story has a single, narrow window. East of the utility room is the dining room, which is one story high and has a flat roof. On the dining room's southeastern elevation, there are a perforated board, five rectangular windows, and a full-height casement window.

The northeastern elevation of the main house is divided into two sections by the northeast wing. On the first floor, there are a perforated board and a door near the house's eastern corner, adjoining the dining room. Near the northern corner, the northeastern elevation has a plate glass window and a door on the first floor. Above is a cantilevered balcony, accessed by a door with windows on either side. The northwestern elevation of the main house is composed almost entirely of boards and battens, aside from a set of small windows.

==== Northeast wing ====
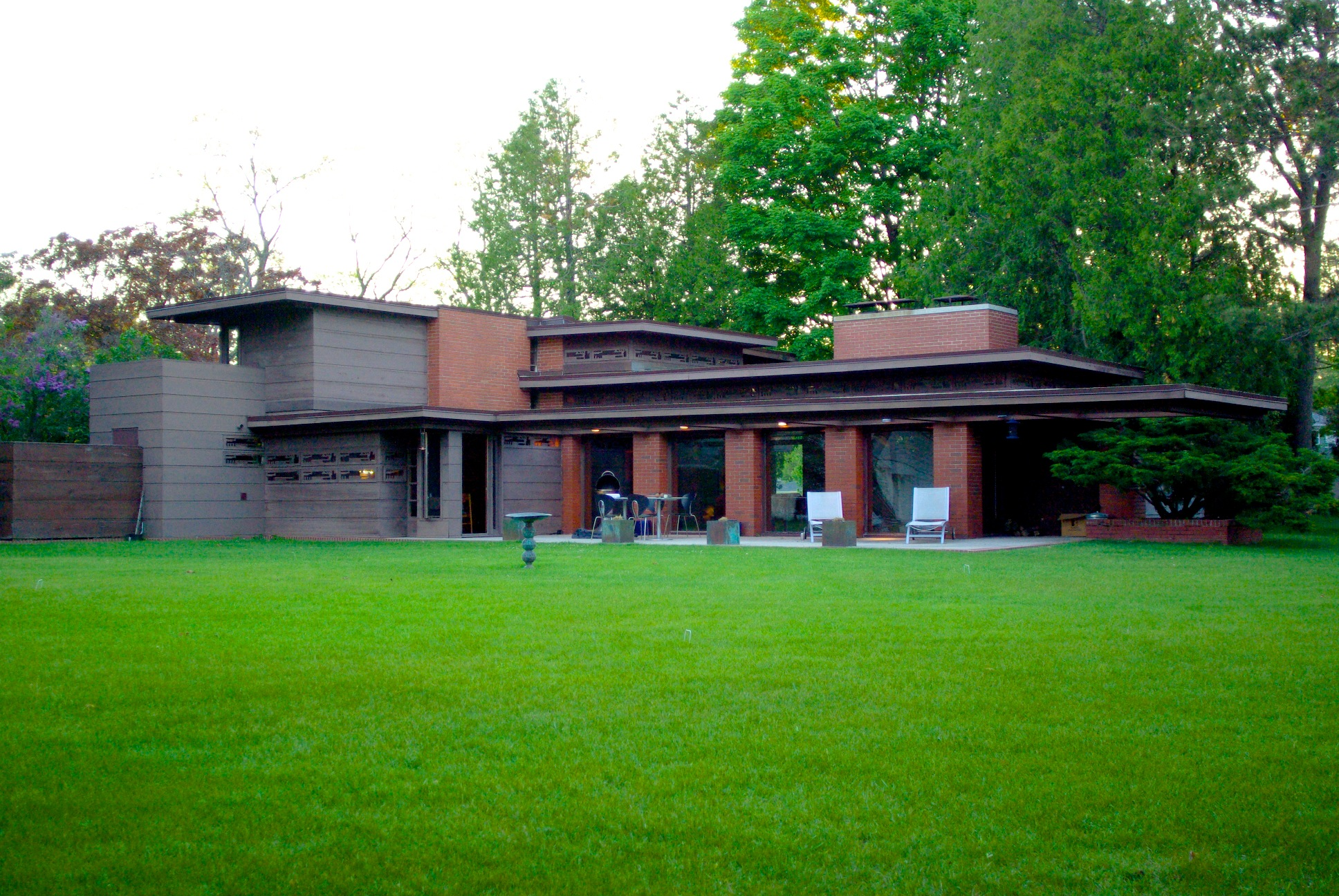
The main house's southeast and northeast elevations (left) and the northeast wing (right), as seen from the east

There is a concrete terrace or patio south of the northeast wing, where it meets the main house. Wright had originally envisioned a swimming pool to the south, but this design feature was replaced with the patio in the final plan. The southern elevation of the northeast wing includes four brick piers, between which are windows overlooking the Twin River. There were originally French doors between these piers, which have since been replaced with full-height glass panes. The eastern (or rear) end of the wing's southern elevation contains a French door and a wooden trellis structure. A second roof is raised above, and set back from, the northeast wing's main roof. There are clerestory windows between the two roof levels.

There is a sunken courtyard at the main house's northern corner, with a brick planter at its western end (adjoining the main house) and stairs to the west and east. The northeast wing's northern elevation has two tiers of windows; the lower tier originally had French doors, while the upper tier includes transom windows. At the western end of the northern elevation, adjoining the main house, is a brick chimney, which is connected to an outdoor fireplace and the house's two interior fireplaces. There are narrow windows next to the chimney, and the fireplace itself is located within the sunken courtyard.

=== Interior ===
The house covers 3,000 square feet (280 m^{2}), with four bedrooms. Sources disagree on whether it has two and a half, three, or four bathrooms. The interiors are arranged around a grid of squares measuring 7 feet (2.1 m) long on each side, around which the entire house is laid out. Tidewater cypress, brick, and full-height windows are used throughout the interior. The ceilings throughout the interior are staggered.

==== Decorative features ====
The primary first-story rooms have Cherokee-red concrete floors, while the hallways, stairs, and bedrooms have wood floors. The Schwartz House has a radiant heating system, sometimes cited as the oldest continuously operating radiant-heating system in the United States; the heating system's pipes are embedded into the floors' crushed-rock foundation. The walls are made of brick and cypress. The cypress boards on the walls are interspersed with battens, which vertically divide the walls into modules measuring 13 inches (33 cm) high. The wooden ceilings have ornamental "light screens", which each consist of a pane of glass between two plywood cutouts. The woodwork throughout the house was coated in several layers of wax, which was then buffed.

Throughout the house, Wright designed built-in furniture and added small closets. He was also responsible all the furnishings, such as fruit bowls, lamps, and cushions. There were several standalone hassocks and tables, though these pieces of furniture have been removed from the first story; additionally, the design includes two indoor fireplaces.

==== Rooms ====
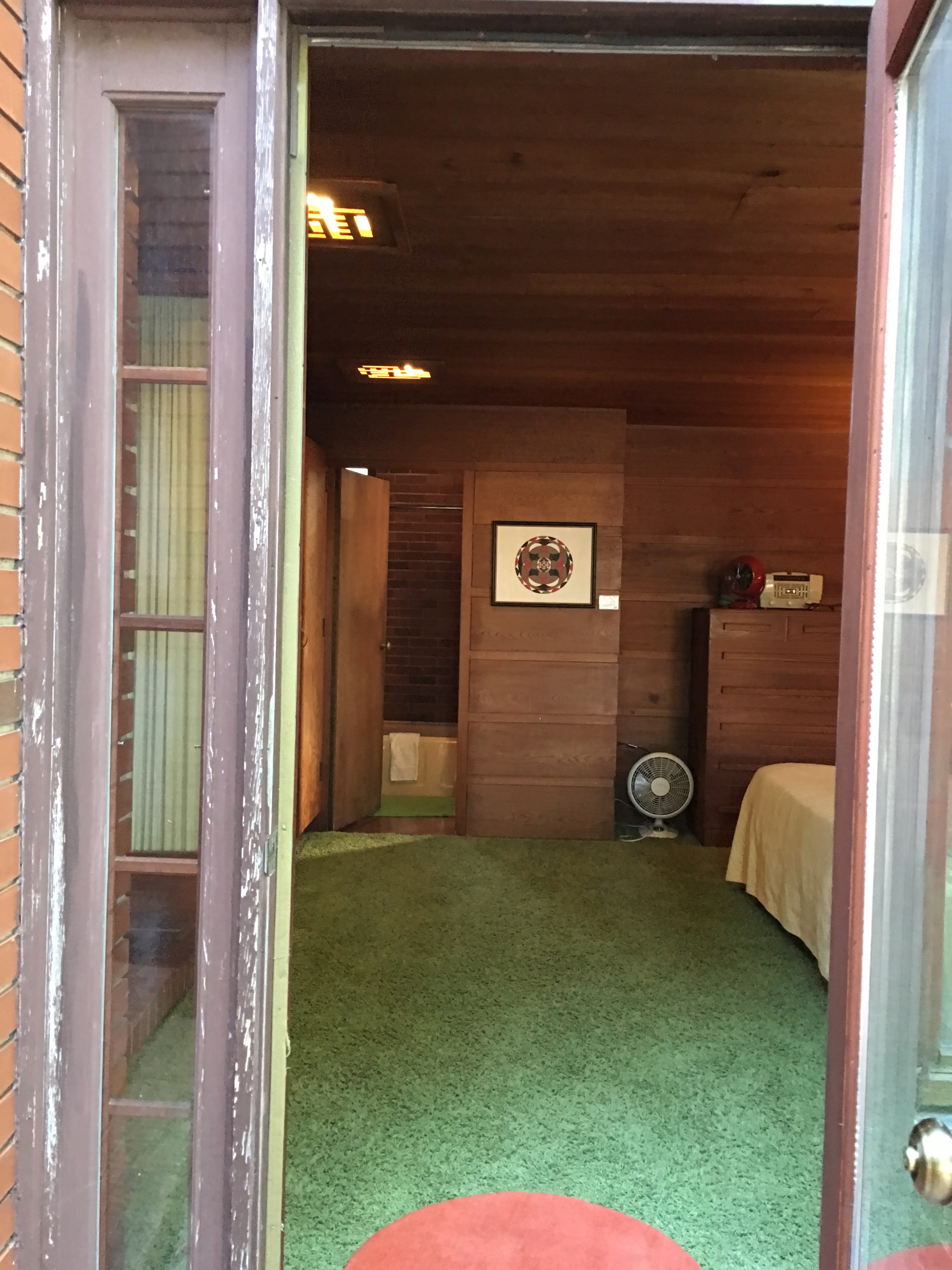
Bedroom interior

The entrance foyer has a ceiling measuring 6 feet 5 inches (1.96 m) high. At the foyer's northwestern corner is a toilet room (originally a closet), a desk, and a brick pier. Next to the brick pier are French doors, which lead north to the master bedroom, located two steps below the foyer. The master bedroom occupies the northwestern part of the house. (Note: For a floor plan of the house, see Sergeant 1984, p. 47.) It has a carpeted floor, a full bathroom, a wardrobe on its south wall, and door to the courtyard on its east wall. The master bathroom has a red brick wall and a high ceiling.

The foyer itself leads directly east to the living room, with no walls between the two rooms. The living room, also described as a recreation room, extends into the house's northeast wing. The living room measures 63 feet (19 m) from front to rear, with a 14-foot (4.3 m) ceiling. The living room's northeastern wall has two fireplaces, each with a brick hearth and an open grate. The smaller of the fireplaces, to the east, faces a small library or study with built-in shelves. There are three ceiling levels; the ceiling at the center of the living room is higher than at the room's northwest boundary, which in turn is higher than at the southeast boundary. The room is illuminated by sunlight from the clerestory windows between the different ceiling levels, in addition to recessed ceiling lights with decorative covers on the room's perimeter. According to Tafel, the clerestory was some 30 feet (9.1 m) wide.

The dining room is along the western side of the house's southern terrace, just southeast of the living room. This room has perforated boards, built-in shelves, a lamp, and a buffet table, while the ceiling has geometric cypress trim and ornate light covers. There was originally a corner table, a central movable table, and hassock seats. West of the dining room is a stairway, which has 13 steps ascending to the second floor. Next to the stairway is a double-height kitchen with cupboards, a counter, a red concrete floor, red brick wall, and a ceiling skylight. At the building's southeastern end, the utility room has a red concrete floor and wood-and-batten walls; the northern portion of the room (next to the kitchen) has a lower ceiling than the southern end. The utility room includes a workbench, sink, shelves, laundry room appliances, and mechanical equipment.

On the second floor is a gallery or hallway. The gallery is lined with three bedrooms, and there is a closet and desk at one end. There is also a half-bathroom next to one bedroom and a full bathroom along the hallway. Each of the second-floor spaces has a beechwood floor, board-and-batten walls. Two of the bedrooms contain wooden wardrobes, built-in shelves, and private balconies. The other bedroom was used by the maid and also has built-in shelves and a balcony, though it was too small to accommodate a wardrobe.

== Impact ==
=== Reception ===
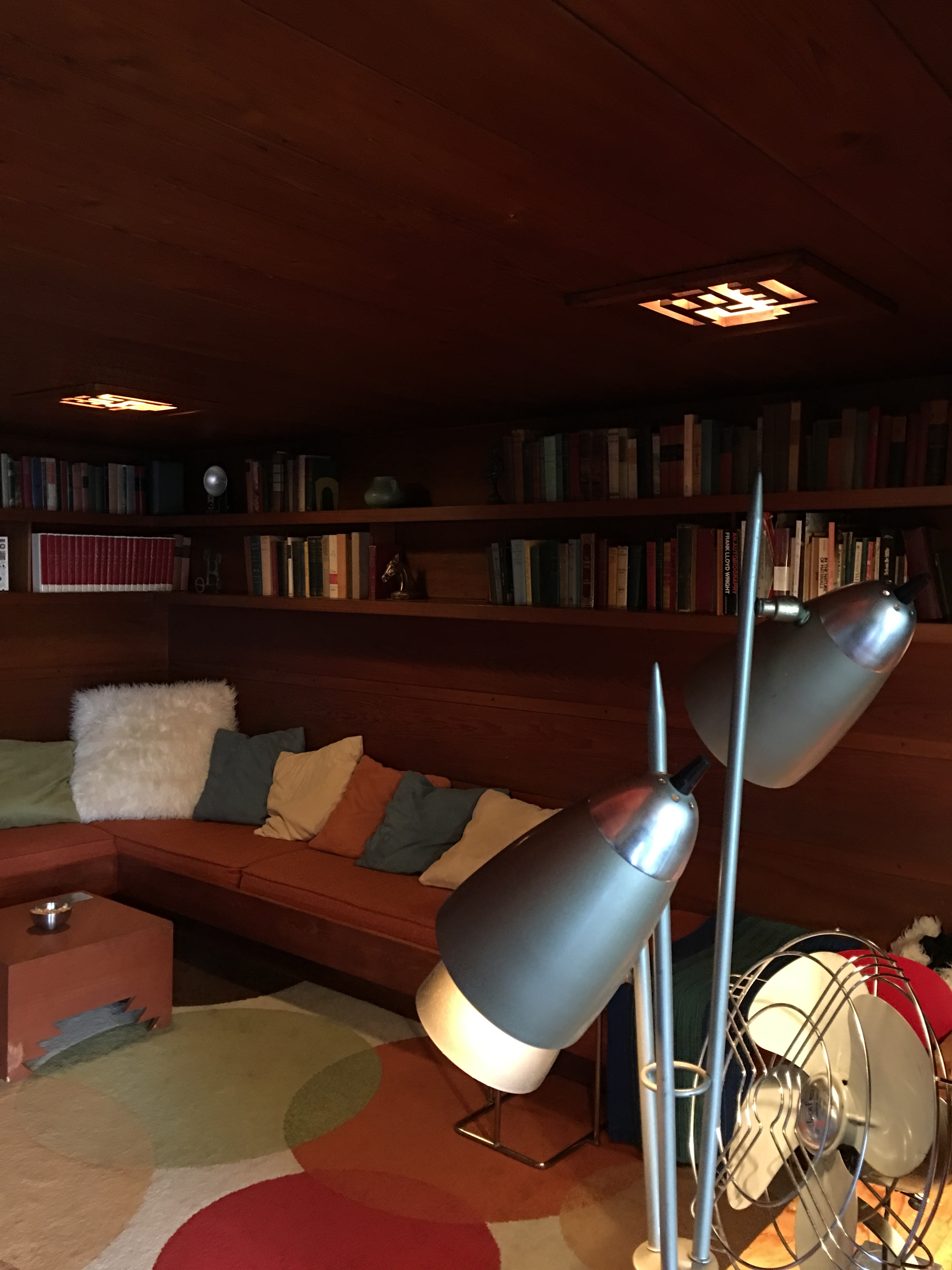
The house's library

When the Schwartz House was finished, Pawlitzke said that local residents criticized its nonstandard design because it had "no basement, radiant heat, concrete floors, walls without studs, no nails, all screws, different windows, different doors". John Sergeant, the author of a book about Wright's Usonian residences, stated in 1984 that the Schwartz House "is a landmark in that elemental region north of Manitowoc". The writer Patrick J. Gagnon described the Schwartz House as "the apex of Two Rivers's architecture". Patti Zarling of the Manitowoc Herald Times Reporter wrote, "This super-cool Frank Lloyd Wright-designed home, with its low, flat roof and carefully lit carport, sits smack in the middle of an ordinary, small-town Wisconsin neighborhood." A writer for Vogue magazine compared the northeast wing to a Chinese lantern at night.

After the house opened as a homestay, Terry Teachout of The Wall Street Journal wrote that the Schwartz House was "like a comfortable home that just happens to be heart-stoppingly beautiful" and that its location in a dense residential neighborhood contrasted with the Peterson Cottage's secluded lakefront setting. Mary Bergin of the Chicago Tribune highlighted the contrast with the undistinguished architecture in the same neighborhood. Bergin highlighted decorative details such as niches and skylights, while Town and Country magazine said its fireplace hearth, walls, and clerestories contributed to a "timeless sense of space and light". Other critics praised Wright's attention to detail and the house's style.

=== Media ===
Wright's longtime photographer Pedro E. Guerrero took five images of the Schwartz House after it was completed. It was also depicted in an exhibit that opened at the Museum of Modern Art in New York in late 1940. Over the years, the Schwartz House has appeared in several television series and print media works. For example, it was shown in the TV series Around the World in 80 Homes in 2004, as well as the Travel Channel series Amazing Vacation Homes the same year. The house was also depicted in a 2021 episode of the Netflix TV series The World's Most Amazing Vacation Rentals. In addition, seven textile pieces and ten furniture pieces were displayed in a 2013 traveling exhibit about Wright's work at the Rahr West Art Museum in Manitowoc.

TheSchwartz House has also been mentioned in several books about Wright's work. Gail Fox, a resident of Two Rivers who had researched the building sporadically for 15 years, wrote a book about it in 2004. For her book, Fox obtained the original construction documents, such as construction schedules and blueprints. Ditmer later said, "There's clearly no one on the planet who knows more history about the house than Gail Fox."

== See also ==
- List of Frank Lloyd Wright works
- National Register of Historic Places listings in Manitowoc County, Wisconsin
