= Gordon House (Silverton, Oregon) =

Historic house in Oregon, US

- U.S. National Register of Historic Places
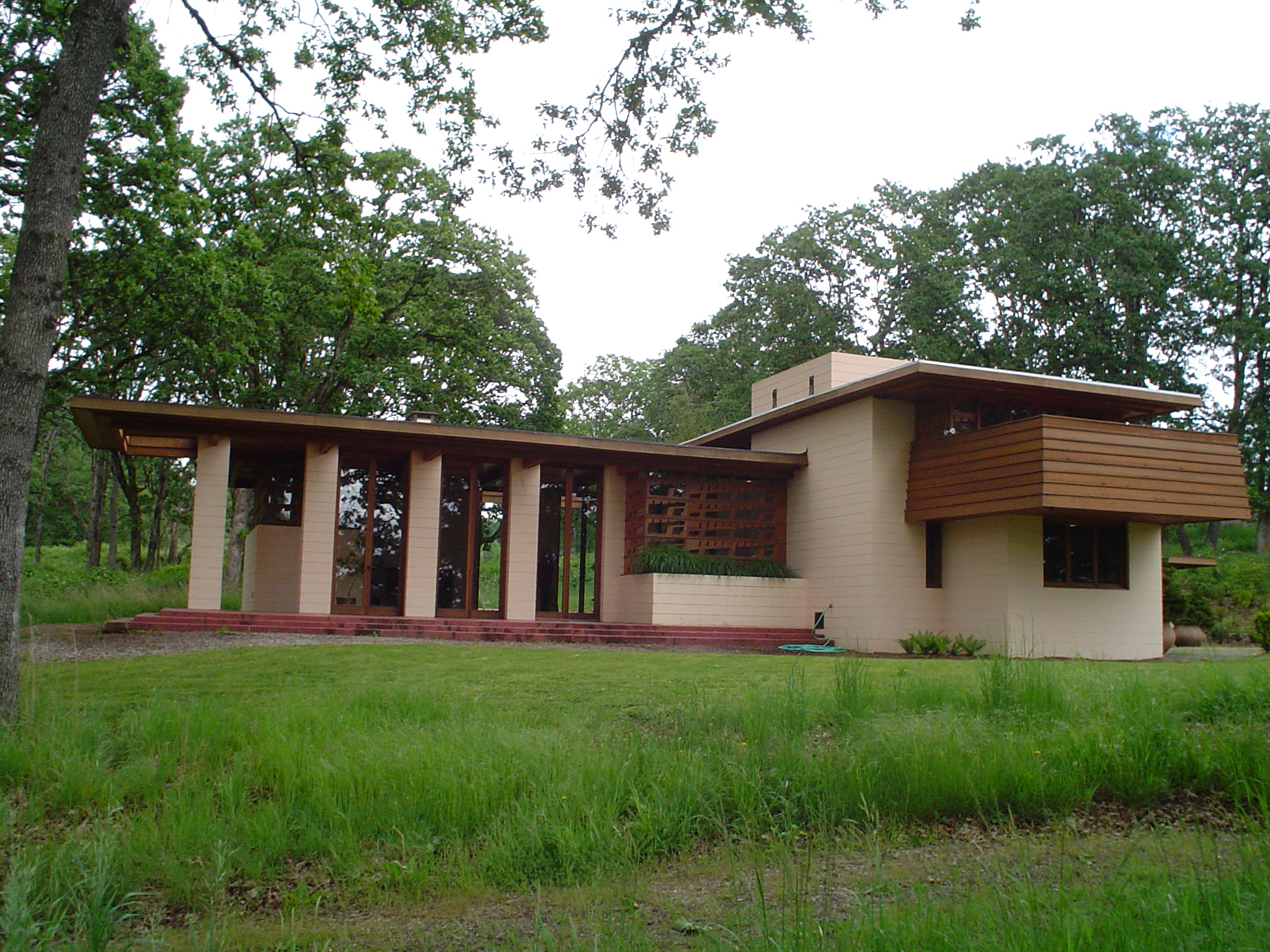
- Front of Gordon House. The living room is at left, bedrooms are upstairs at right, and the kitchen is below the bedrooms.

- Location within Oregon Location within the United States
- Interactive map showing the Gordon House
- Location: 869 W. Main St., Silverton, Oregon
- Coordinates: 44°59′47″N 122°47′30″W
- Built: 1963
- Architects: Frank Lloyd Wright; Burton Goodrich
- Architectural style: Usonian
- Website: Official website
- NRHP reference No.: 04001066
- Added to NRHP: September 22, 2004

The Gordon House is a two-story Usonian–style house at the Oregon Garden in Silverton, Oregon, United States. Designed by Frank Lloyd Wright, with Burton Goodrich as the supervising architect, the house was completed in 1963 for the farmer Conrad Gordon and his wife Evelyn. The house was originally situated near Wilsonville, Oregon, between the Willamette River and Mount Hood, but it was relocated 24 miles (39 km) to the Oregon Garden in 2001. The Gordon House is one of two based on a 1938 "dream house" design published in Life magazine, the other being the Bernard Schwartz House in Wisconsin. It is listed on the National Register of Historic Places.

Conrad and Evelyn Gordon visited Wright's Taliesin West studio in Arizona in 1956 and subsequently asked him to design a house for them. Ed Strandberg was hired as the general contractor, while Goodrich assisted in the house's design and oversaw the completion of the house after Wright died in 1959. The Gordons lived there until their respective deaths. After Evelyn died in 1997, her son sold the house in 2000 to the Smith family, who wanted to demolish it. The Smiths agreed in November 2000 to donate the house to the Frank Lloyd Wright Building Conservancy on the condition that the house be relocated. After the second story and roof were moved to the Oregon Garden in March 2001, the house was restored, and the ground-level first story was rebuilt. The house opened to the public in March 2002, becoming the only publicly accessible Wright home in the Pacific Northwest.

The house is arranged in a "T" shape, with bedrooms and maintenance rooms in one wing and the main living space in another wing. The exterior is made of concrete and red cedar, interspersed with large glass windows and perforated decorative boards; there are also overhanging flat roofs, and terraces. Adjoining the house are a terrace to the east and a carport to the south. The interior covers 2,133 square feet (198.2 m^{2}), with a radiant heating system and concrete and red-cedar decorations. The master bedroom, living room, office, and kitchen are on the first floor, while the other bedrooms are on the second floor; there is no attic. Wright also designed built-in furniture and custom furnishings for the house.

== Site ==
The Gordon House is located at the Oregon Garden in Silverton, Oregon, United States. Until 2001, it was located in the city of Wilsonville, Oregon. It was originally surrounded by grass, wildflowers, and plants. At the Oregon Garden, the house sits on nearly the same latitude as at its original location. After the house was relocated to the Oregon Garden, a wheelchair-accessible pathway and a gravel driveway were built around it. The topography of the original site has been replicated at the new location. A grove of Oregon white oaks, a native tree that has mostly been eradicated from the area, is also planted around the house. There are also some deciduous trees, which resemble the trees that were planted around the house's original site. A path leads from the west side of the house to an "outdoor room", and another path connects to a 1.3-mile (2.1 km) trail called the Oregon Garden Loop.

== History ==
=== Design context ===
During the 1930s, the architect Frank Lloyd Wright had received significant press coverage after having completed Fallingwater, a house for the Kaufmann family in Pennsylvania. At the time, Wright designed houses mostly for well-off families, but he was also beginning to design lower-cost Usonian houses for middle-class families. In general, his Usonian houses tended to have open plans, geometric floor grids, in-floor heating, and a carport, without a garage or basement. Throughout his career, he also designed several farmhouses.

In mid-1938, Life magazine invited eight architects (including Wright) to draw up "dream houses" for four families, each in a different income bracket. (Note: The families' income brackets and their respective architects are as follows: $2,000–3,000: Richard Koch and Edward Durell Stone; $4,000–5,000: H. Roy Kelley and William Wilson Wurster; $5,000–6,000: Royal Barry Wills and Frank Lloyd Wright; $10,000–12,000: Aymar Embury II and Harrison & Fouilhoux) Each architect drew up either a modern design or a traditional design for each family. Wright and Royal Barry Wills were respectively asked to create modern and traditional–style designs for a middle-income family, the Blackbourn family of Minneapolis. Wright described his design as "a little private club" with an open plan first floor, bedrooms on the second story, an enclosed patio, a flat roof, and an outdoor pool or sunken garden. The Blackbourns ultimately selected Wills' design, and the eight dream house plans were published in Life magazine on September 26, 1938, rapidly gaining large amounts of attention. The Wisconsin businessman Bernard Schwartz was the first to commission Wright's Life plan; this became the Bernard Schwartz House, built in Two Rivers, Wisconsin, in 1940.

=== Gordon ownership ===
==== Development ====
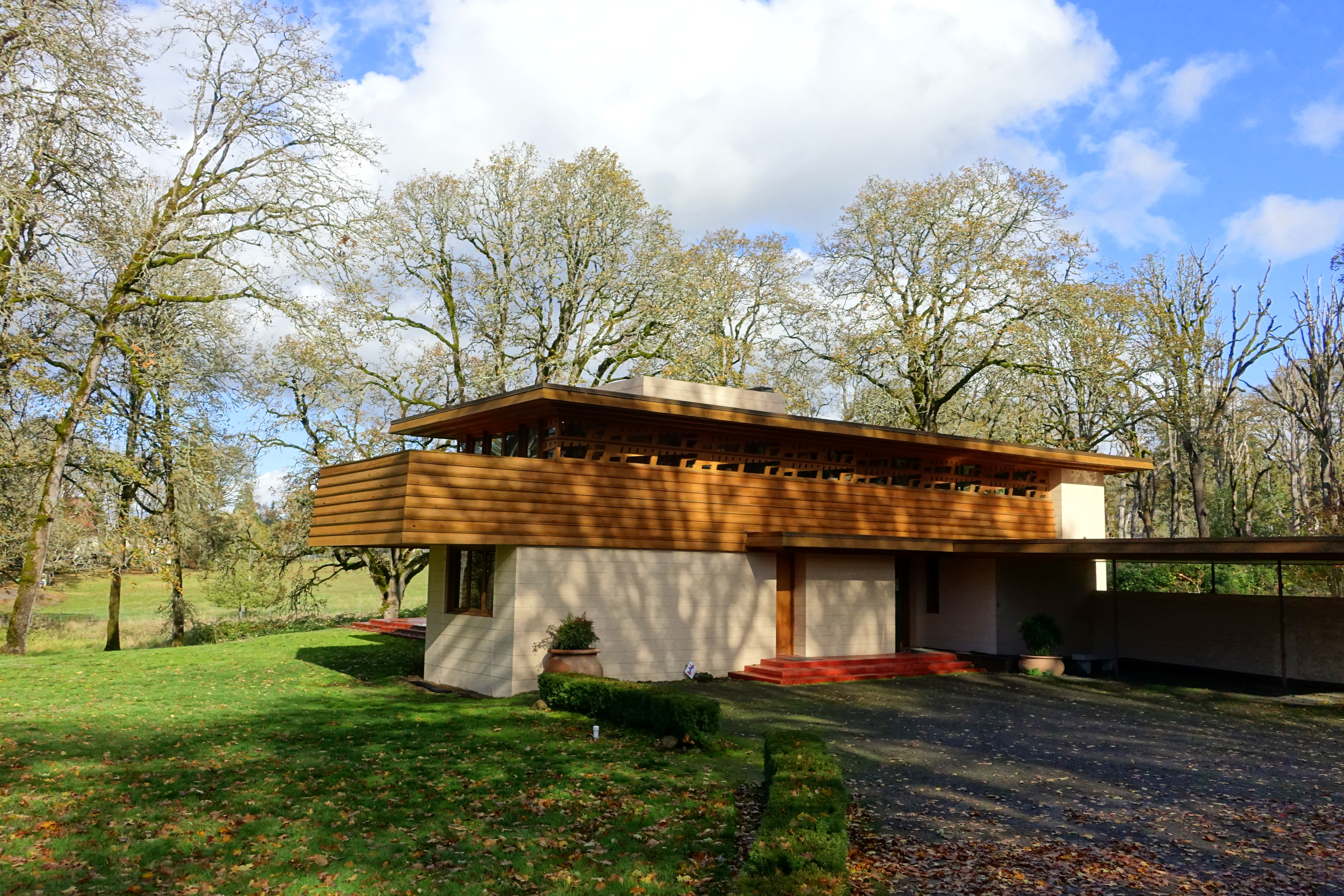
Main entrance near carport

The farmer Conrad Gordon and his wife Evelyn of Salem, Oregon, visited Wright's Taliesin West studio in Arizona in 1956. The Gordons owned 240 acres (97 ha) of cleared land and 320 acres (130 ha) of farmland in the Willamette Valley, which they had bought in 1948. Their site, known as Gordon's Run, was located near Wilsonville, Oregon, overlooking the Willamette River on the west side and Mount Hood to the east. The site had formerly been part of the Aurora Colony, founded before Oregon had become a state. The Gordons had farmed Gordon's Run for more than a decade before selling off most of the land, keeping 22 acres (8.9 ha) for themselves. By the late 1950s, they wanted to develop a house on the land. Evelyn had been a longtime art and architecture enthusiast with a particular interest in Wright's work. Sources disagree on whether the Gordons had visited Taliesin West specifically to ask Wright to design them a house, or whether they had merely mentioned the idea of developing a new house to a tour guide, who then put them in contact with Wright.

Wright initially was reluctant to accept the commission, but he ultimately accepted it because he had never designed a building in Oregon, and he aimed to design at least one building in every U.S. state. In addition, his onetime apprentice Burton Goodrich, who worked in nearby Lake Oswego, would be able to oversee the design. Goodrich sent over plat diagrams and geological surveys of the site to Wright. After agreeing to design the Gordon House, Wright sketched out the plans in colored pencil, taking inspiration from the 1938 Life plan. Wright never visited the site before his death, instead working entirely off drawings and photographs; he was busy designing New York's Solomon R. Guggenheim Museum at the time. Conrad objected to Wright's original low-to-the-ground couches, instead preferring cushions like those in his Chevrolet vehicle. As a result, the couch cushions were designed to the same dimensions as the cushions in Gordon's vehicle.

The Gordons initially planned to spend $25,000, (Note: Equivalent to $219,000 in 2025 (Note: Johnston, Louis; Williamson, Samuel H. (2023). "What Was the U.S. GDP Then?". MeasuringWorth. United States Gross Domestic Product deflator figures follow the MeasuringWorth series.)) far more than the $15,000 average cost of a bungalow at the time. (Note: Equivalent to $131,000 in 2025) When they began looking for a construction contractor, the Gordons received bids of up to $100,000. (Note: Equivalent to $875,000 in 2025) As such, even though the house's design was finished in 1957, construction did not begin for another several years. After Wright died in 1959, Goodrich oversaw the completion of the Gordon House. The contractor Ed Strandberg, who would later become a longtime collaborator of Goodrich, was hired to construct the house. Strandberg recalled that, in 1962, an inspector for Oregon City's building-permit department was initially reluctant to grant the house a construction permit, citing the low ceilings and the presence of gravel under the foundation footings. After Strandberg told the inspector the architect's name, he recalled that he not only received his permit, but also had several photographers take pictures of the plans. Construction took three months longer than expected because contractors were focused on perfecting the house's architectural details.

==== Usage ====
The house was finished in 1963 or 1964, several years after Wright died. It had cost $56,000 in total. (Note: Equivalent to $451,000 in 2025) The Gordons moved into the house on May 1, 1964, and hosted an open house for visitors the following week. The open house, which went on for five days, attracted 300 students and 1,500 other visitors. Afterward, Evelyn continued to host visitors who were interested in the building's architecture, keeping a guestbook and inviting visitors inside for a story and a walking tour. Evelyn displayed her artwork, including weavings, sculptures, and paintings, in the house. Conrad lived in the house until his death, though sources disagree on whether he died in the 1960s, 1978, or 1979.

The Clackamas County government added the house to its list of historic resources in 1992. The house sustained minor damage after a flood in the 1990s. The Gordons' son Edward placed the house for sale in the early 1990s, requesting either $3.1 million or $3.3 million. (Note: Equivalent to $6.7–7.2 million in 2025) He expected that the land could be subdivided, but the house was far enough from Portland that there was little demand for subdividing the land. The asking price was then reduced to $2.3 million, and then to $1.1 million. (Note: Respectively equivalent to $5.0 million, and $2.4 million in 2025) Evelyn retained the house until her death in 1997, after which Edward again placed the house for sale. By then, The Sunday Oregonian reported that the house was boarded up. The existing house had rotting wood, drafty walls, and a leaking roof, and the concrete foundation made it very difficult to move the house.

=== Preservation attempts ===
==== Sale and proposed demolition ====
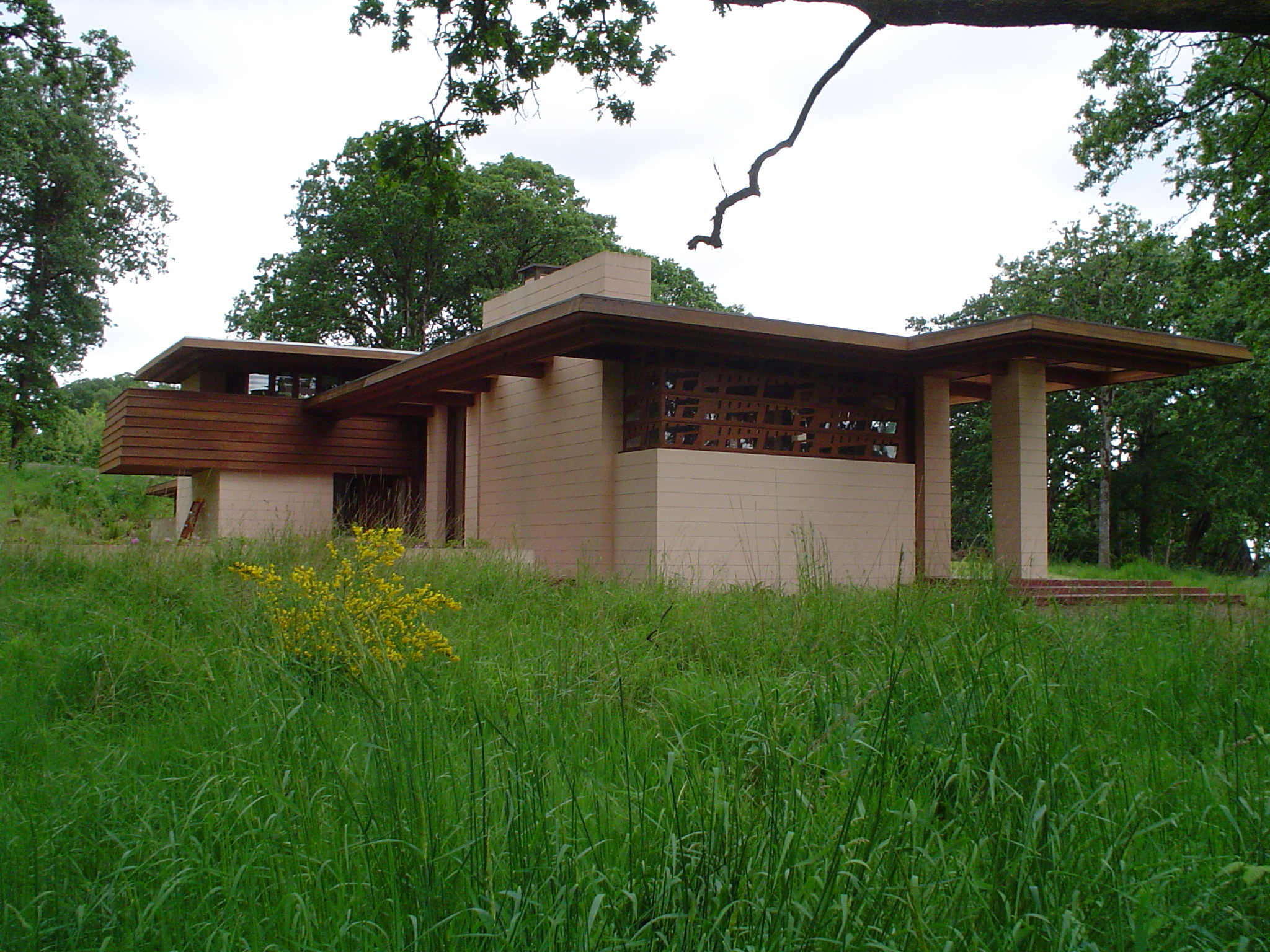
Northeast corner

In September 2000, David and Carey Smith bought the 22-acre (8.9 ha) Gordon property, including the house, for approximately $1.1 million. (Note: Equivalent to $2.0 million in 2025) Deborah Vick, who lived nearby and was on the board of directors of the Frank Lloyd Wright Building Conservancy, recalled that the organization had been "hoping for responsible owners" but were unaware that the Gordon family had accepted an offer for the house. The Smiths announced plans to construct a new house. Because the land was zoned solely as farmland, Oregon zoning laws required that the existing house be sealed up or demolished before a new house could be built on the site. The Sunday Oregonian reported that David Smith was vague about his plans for the Gordon House but that Clackamas County officials had received inquiries about the possibility of demolishing the house. That October, the Smiths asked the county's board of commissioners to remove the house from the county's list of historic places, since they could not receive a demolition permit unless the designation was revoked.

The architectural community expressed concerns about the proposed demolition of the house, which heretofore had received little public attention. The Frank Lloyd Wright Building Conservancy and the American Institute of Architects' Portland chapter sent the Smiths several letters offering to buy or restore the house, initially receiving no response. The Smiths' contractor asked the architect Alan Mascord to design a house costing $1.5 million, (Note: Equivalent to $2.7 million in 2025) which he declined. Mascord recalled that he had unsuccessfully tried to convince the Smiths to preserve the Gordon House. The interior designer Diane Plesset and her husband Jay also proposed buying the Gordon House and moving it to another part of the Smiths' land. The Clackamas County board of commissioners received large amounts of correspondence from across the U.S. advocating for the house's preservation, prompting it to schedule a public hearing for what was usually a pro forma delisting process.

Despite agreeing to host a public hearing on the house, the commissioners planned to delist the house anyway. Under the state's "owner consent" law, an owner had to consent to their property being listed as a historic site; the board of commissioners interpreted this law to mean that the current owner, not just a past owner, needed to agree to this listing. The hearing, originally scheduled for November 9, was delayed while the Plessets negotiated to buy the house. At the end of November 2000, just minutes before the board meeting, the Smiths agreed to donate the house to the Wright Building Conservancy. The donation temporarily preserved the house while allowing the Smiths to receive a tax deduction given to Wright–designed properties. As part of the agreement with the Smiths, the house had to be moved from the Smith family's property before March 15, 2001; the board of commissioners removed the house from its list of historic sites, permitting the house's relocation.

==== Relocation ====
The Wright Building Conservancy still needed to find a buyer for the house so it could be relocated. At the time, the conservancy estimated that it would cost $700,000 (Note: Equivalent to $1.2 million in 2025) to renovate, restore, and maintain the house (Note: This was divided into $300,000 for the house itself, $300,000 for renovation, $70,000 to cover expenses that the foundation had incurred, and $30,000 for long-term maintenance.) Three groups submitted proposals for the house. In January 2001, the conservancy accepted a proposal from the Oregon Garden Society of Silverton, Oregon, to relocate the house at a cost of $1.65 million. (Note: Equivalent to $2.9 million in 2025) The government of Marion County (where Silverton is located) contributed $400,000 toward the purchase price, (Note: Equivalent to $0.7 million in 2025) and the Silverton city government borrowed another $400,000. The house was to be moved to the Oregon Garden, a botanical garden about 24 miles (39 km) away. (Note: Other sources give a figure of 21 miles (34 km) or 25 miles (40 km).) The garden's executive director, Rick Gustafson, said the house would help attract a larger clientele to the garden. The acquisition was the result of a misunderstanding: Gustafson offered to help assist in its preservation, but an architect involved with the preservation process misinterpreted this as an offer to buy the house.

After buying the house, the Oregon Garden Society had six weeks to relocate it, and the garden devised a plan alongside the Silverton government and Wright Building Conservancy. The society also hosted a fundraiser for the house's relocation. Workers first removed the woodwork, furniture, paneling, and windows. Over 50 steel beams were installed to carry the second floor of the house, which was then placed on hydraulic lifts. The first-story walls were cut off at a height of 5 feet (1.5 m) to allow the second story to be relocated. The house was then disassembled into four large pieces. The roof was cut into three sections (Note: According to National Park Service 2004, p. 8, the carport's 18 by 34 ft (5.5 by 10.4 m) roof was moved in one piece. The roof above the rest of the house was split into two pieces measuring 24 by 70 ft (7.3 by 21.3 m).) and relocated in February 2001. The upper floor was then moved as a single unit weighing 70 short tons (63 long tons; 64 t) and measuring about 69 feet (21 m) long. Workers relocated the upper story 30 miles (48 km) between March 9 and 11, 2001. The upper floor was carried by a convoy of three trucks, which had to travel at 5 miles per hour (8.0 km/h). To minimize congestion, the trucks could not transport the house over public roads for more than four hours a day.

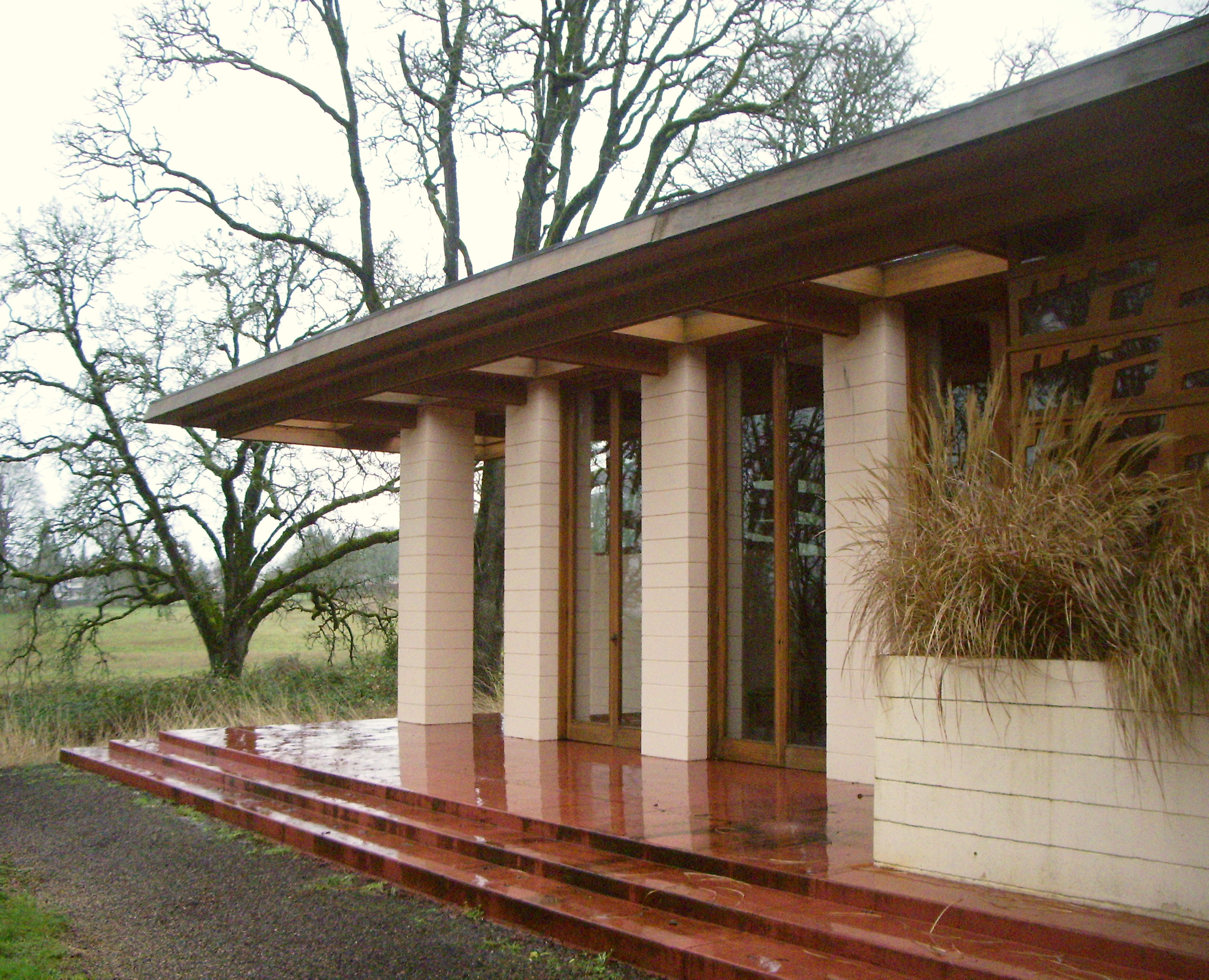
The concrete floor and the lower sections of the house's walls were replicated after being relocated.

Reconstruction at the new site commenced in April 2001, with the house being rebuilt to within 1/16 inch (1.6 mm) of the original plans. The structure was rebuilt along its original north–south orientation, and the roof was reconstructed. The concrete floor and the lower sections of the house's walls were replicated, since relocating them had been impossible. A new radiant-heating system was installed, and workers seismically retrofitted the supports. Grants from the Oregon Cultural Trust helped pay for the house's refurbishment. The roof was completed by July 2001, at which point the house was scheduled to open early the following year. Members of the public were first allowed to view the house at its new location on September 17, 2001, even though interior work had not been completed. By then, the garden was raising $450,000 toward the house's reconstruction, in addition to $350,000 for landscaping and other upgrades; the reconstruction was to cost $1.2 million. (Note: Equivalent to $0.8 million for the reconstruction, $0.6 million for the landscaping and upgrades, and $2.1 million for the total reconstruction, in 2025)

=== Use as public venue ===
==== 2000s ====
The Gordon House opened to the public on March 2, 2002, and was initially used as a reception building for the Oregon Garden. The same year, the Gordon House Conservancy was established for the house's upkeep, and the garden hired several docents to explain the house to guests. Except for new wiring and smoke detectors, the house had been restored almost exactly to its original appearance. Several smaller upgrades had been postponed due to a lack of funds; these would be carried out as donations came in. The Statesman Journal reported in 2002 that the house still needed another $400,000 to fix water damage, complete the landscaping, and repair the bathrooms. (Note: Equivalent to $0.7 million in 2025) The high restoration cost was in part due to the need to replicate the original locally-sourced materials, which had initially been selected for their cost efficiency. The Gordon House was the only publicly accessible Frank Lloyd Wright home in the Pacific Northwest, and one of two Wright–designed Usonian houses that the public could visit, the other being the Pope–Leighey House outside Alexandria, Virginia. Like many Wright–designed buildings, the Gordon House continued to be known for its original owner.

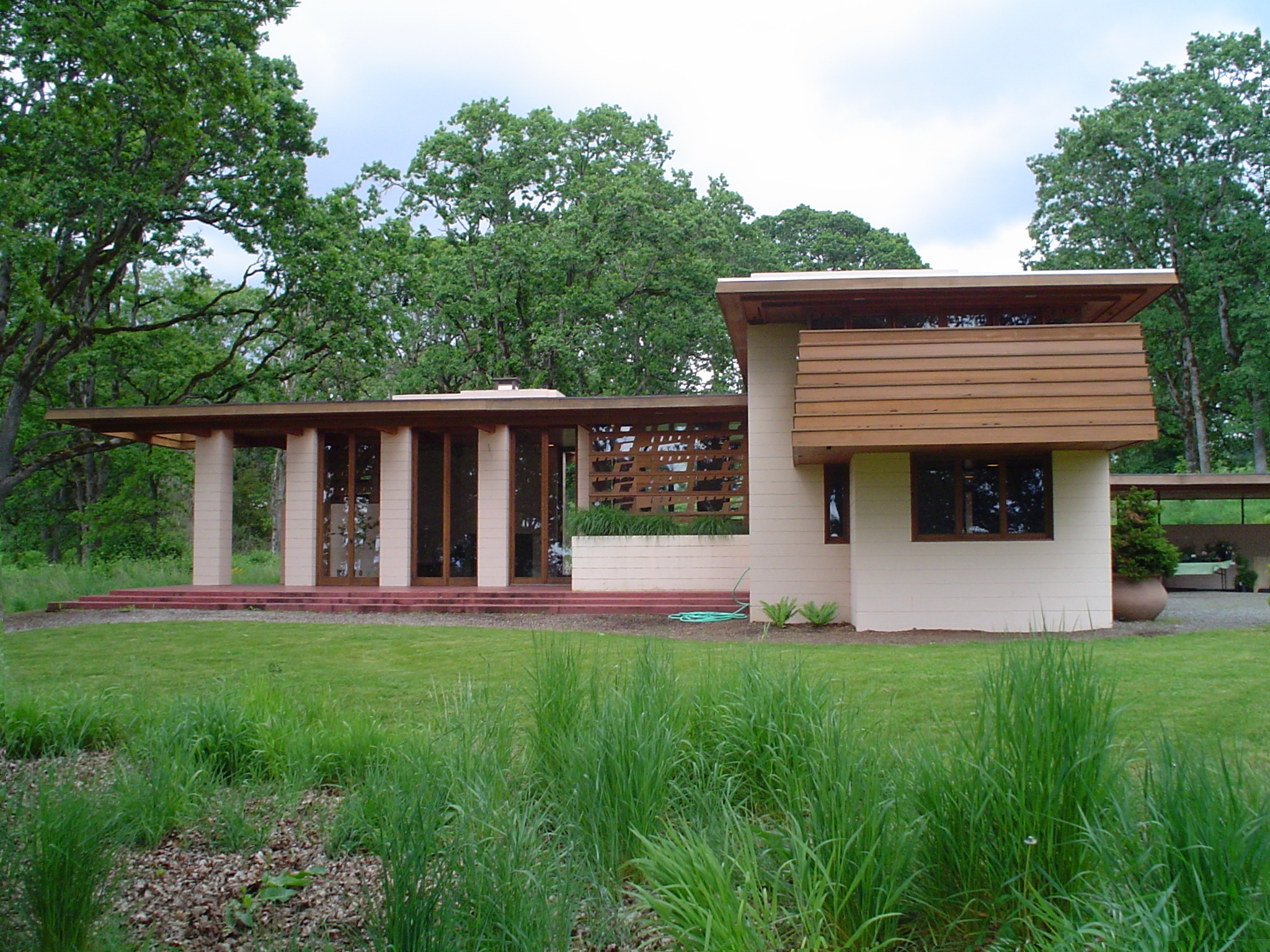
The western facade

By 2003, the Gordon House Conservancy had 30 docents and planned to double that number; more in-depth tours of the house were organized starting that January. The house had accommodated 26,000 visitors in its first year, and the Gordon House Conservancy planned to host additional events to raise money for renovation and increase visitation. At the time, the conservancy had raised $27,000 toward the estimated $400,000 repair cost. The Gordon House was listed on the National Register of Historic Places in 2004, and the same year, the Gordon House Conservancy received a $10,000 grant to restore the house's wooden battens and boards. The conservancy also added flashing along the roof and chimney. The conservancy received another $6,000 in 2006 for furniture restoration, and the Oregon State Federation of Garden Clubs donated money for trees and shrubs around the house the next year. By the late 2000s, the Gordon House Conservancy was attempting to attract visitors by selling a multi-attraction pass that could also be used at other Wright–designed houses.

==== 2010s to present ====
The Gordon House Conservancy continued to restore the house, and it was raising funds to renovate the entryway by 2010; the house's incandescent lights were replaced the same year. After the house's boiler stopped working, a new heating system powered by treated wastewater was installed in 2011, reducing the house's monthly heating costs from $500 to $8. The same year, an Angel of Hope statue was installed outside the Gordon House. In advance of the house's 50th anniversary, the Gordon House Conservancy also started raising funds for $300,000 capital campaign for a wider-ranging restoration of the house. The conservancy had raised $200,000 by 2013, including a $60,000 matching funds grant from the M. J. Murdock Charitable Trust and $5,000 from the Safeway Foundation for an education center. At that point, the capital campaign had increased to $400,000. Parts of the house were deteriorating; for example, one of the cantilevered balconies had to be propped up using a wooden beam.

To attract visitors, the conservancy began giving pre-recorded tours of the house's exterior in 2012, as many visitors were unable or unwilling to attend the interior tours. During the 2010s, Roger Hall, a curator at the Hallie Ford Museum of Art, reacquired some of the art that Evelyn Gordon had owned. The conservancy had a $100,000 annual budget by 2015, with three full-time staffers. It had accommodated over 100,000 visitors by then, with 6,000 annual visitors touring the interior on average. To raise additional money, in 2018, the conservancy began allowing members to stay in the house overnight. The Oregon Cultural Trust gave the Gordon House Conservancy a $17,500 grant to renovate the house's facade in 2024, and the conservancy raised $20,900 in matching funds. The same year, a landscaping project around the house was completed, including new retaining walls, drainage, and a pathway, and both the interior and facade were repainted. In 2026, the Gordon House Conservancy began raising funds to restore the toilets.

== Architecture ==
The house was designed by Frank Lloyd Wright, with his apprentice Burton Goodrich as the supervising architect, and is the only house in Oregon directly designed by Wright. (Note: Another house in Eugene, Oregon, was inspired by a Wright design, but the design was modified when the house was built.) It is also one of four Usonian houses in the Pacific Northwest that Wright designed after World War II; the other three are all in Washington. (Note: The other three are the Brandes House in Sammamish, the William B. Tracy House in Normandy Park, and the Milton Stricker House in Tacoma.) The Gordon House is one of two derived directly from a plan that Wright created for Life magazine in 1938, the other being the Bernard Schwartz House in Two Rivers, Wisconsin, completed in 1940. The house is arranged in a "T" shape; the bedrooms and utility spaces run east–west, occupying the crossbar of the "T", which is two stories high. The main room extends northward from the bedroom and utility wing and is one and a half stories high.

The house is decorated in a palette of reds, and concrete and red cedar from the Pacific Northwest are used throughout the house. To save money, Wright used materials from the local area, but he decided to use concrete after failing to acquire local stone. The Gordon House also contains perforated screens, which each consist of a pane of glass between two plywood cutouts. To blur the distinction between the exterior and interior, Wright used the same materials indoors and outdoors. For example, the horizontal siding of the facade passes through the window panes, and large windows are used to integrate the exterior and interior space.

=== Exterior ===
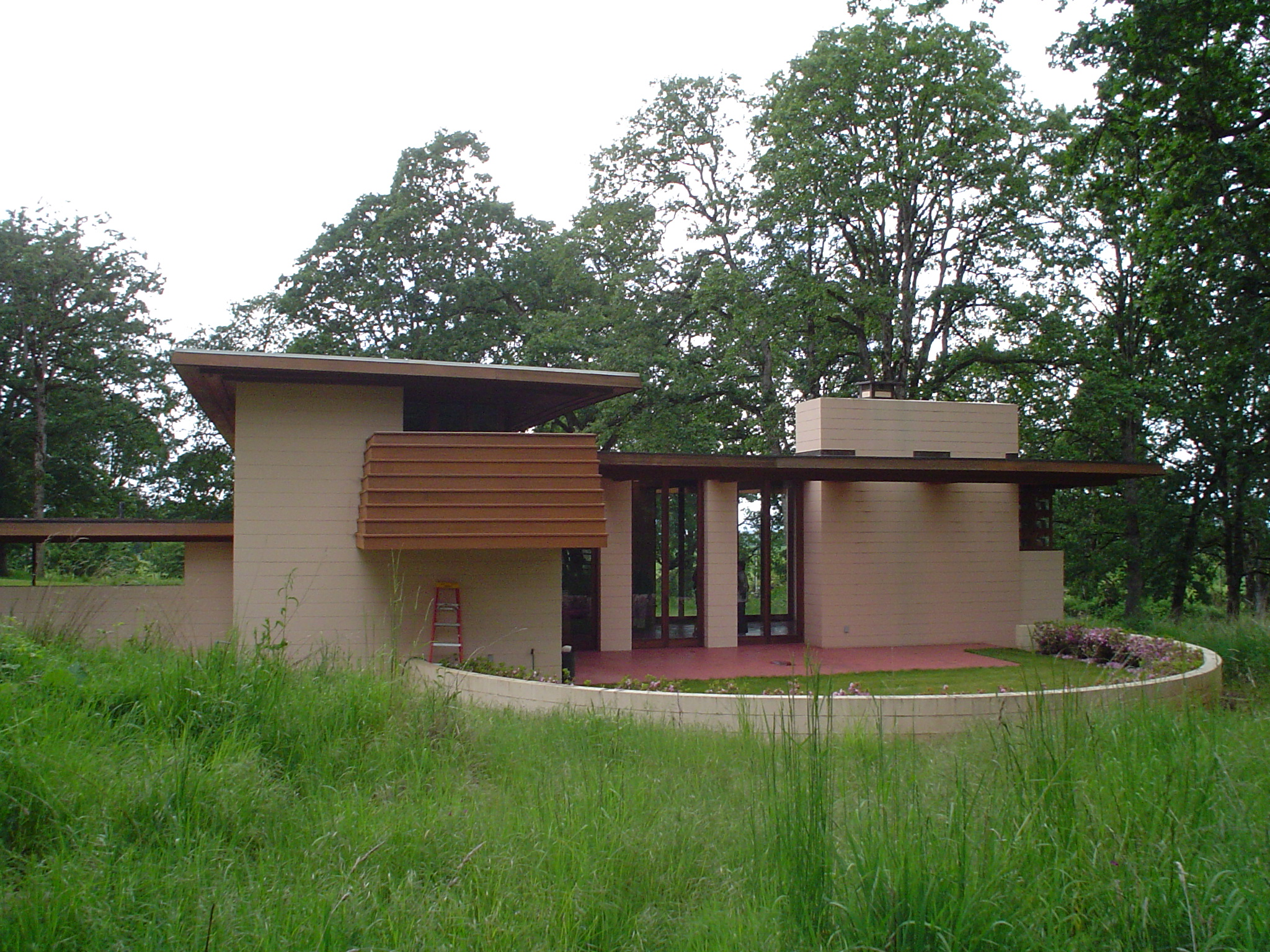
The eastern facade, with the semicircular garden terrace just outside the living room

The facade is made largely of concrete. To save money, Wright used fixed-pane windows rather than movable windows. Air flow is provided by wooden French doors throughout the house, and the doors on the living room's western and eastern elevations could be opened to allow cross-ventilation. Several balconies are cantilevered off the facade and are clad in red cedar. Parts of the house's facade are clad with red cedar boards measuring 1 by 8 inches (25 by 203 mm), laid horizontally. There are also two levels of overhanging flat roofs, which are covered with a copper flashing and are supported by beams and joists.

On the facade's southern elevation is a carport at the first story, with space for three cars. The carport is covered by a cantilevered canopy that extends perpendicularly from the two-story bedroom-and-utility wing. Below the carport canopy is the house's main entrance, which is recessed into the facade and has stepped-back concrete walls. Three steps ascend from the carport's northern boundary to the entrance, and there is a 6-foot-tall (1.8 m) concrete-block partition along the carport's eastern boundary. Above the carport, the southern elevation has perforated boards on the second floor, which double as privacy screens. Next to these second-floor boards are two cantilevered balconies.

On the western elevation are five piers; the northernmost pier is freestanding and supports the roof, and there are wooden French doors between the remaining piers, which form part of the facade. There is a trellis cantilevered from the western elevation, as well as a cantilevered balcony above it. The western facade of the office, which originally faced the Willamette River, has a fixed-pane window flanked by a casement window on either side. The living space's northern elevation has a perforated board, behind which is the house's library. The eastern elevation of the living room has three concrete piers, and there are wooden French doors between each set of piers. There is a semicircular garden terrace just east of the living room, which is surrounded by a short concrete-block parapet. South of the living room, the eastern elevation of the master bedroom is made of concrete masonry. There is a balcony on the eastern elevation's second story, which is accessed by doors at the northeast corner of the second story's eastern bedroom and six French doors on the bedroom's eastern wall. The doors could be retracted to give the appearance that the corner has disappeared.

=== Interior ===
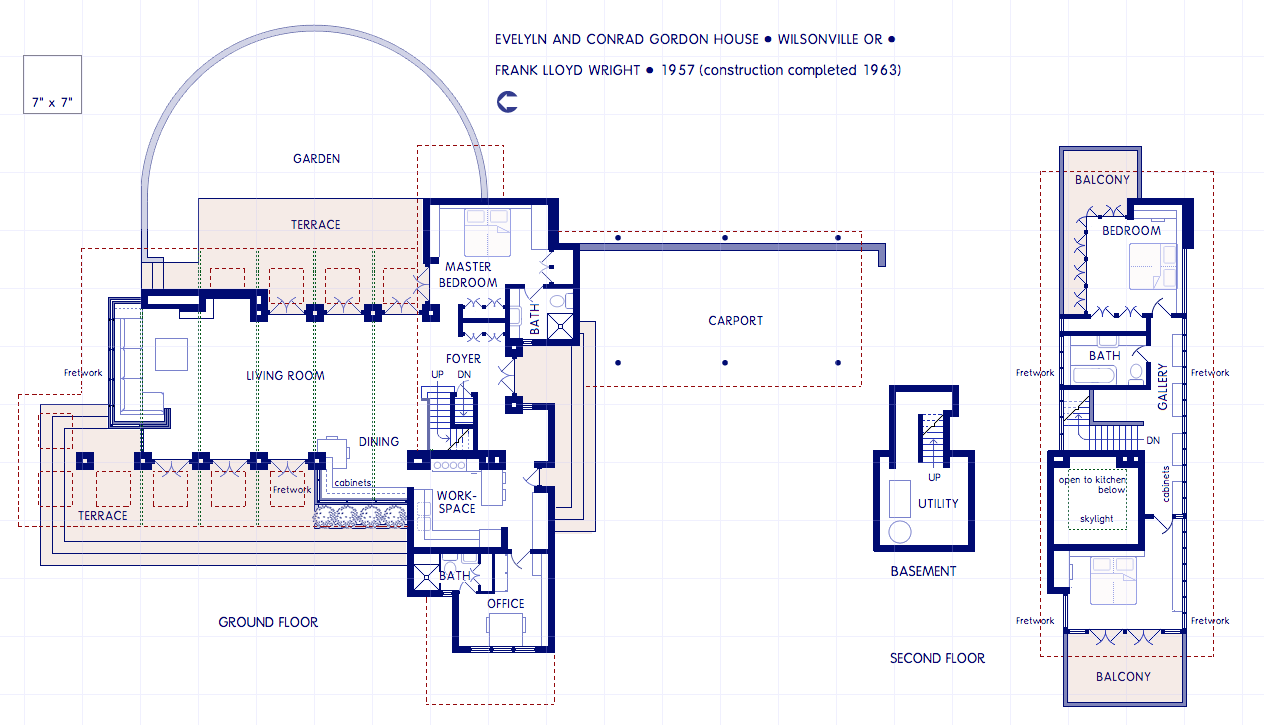
Floor plans

The house has a floor area of 2,133 square feet (198.2 m^{2}), with three bedrooms. There are also three bathrooms, which, at the time of the house's construction, was an abnormally high number of bathrooms for a house of that size. It is arranged around a concrete-block utility core measuring 11 by 11 feet (3.4 by 3.4 m), with a bathroom, kitchen, and fireplace hearth. The interiors are arranged around a grid of squares measuring 7 feet (2.1 m) long on each side, around which the entire house is laid out. The living room on the first floor measures one and a half stories, while the bedrooms are split across two stories.

Wright designed built-in furniture throughout the house, and there are various drawers and closets. Among the furniture he designed were banquette seats next to the fireplace and several tables for the rooms. The wooden trim and furnishings have chamfers placed at 15-degree angles, and the bottoms of the perforated boards are also sloped at 15-degree angles. The wooden decorations are placed at the same height as the house's horizontal concrete decorations. All of the house's doors are made from Western red cedar and open outward; some of the doors have windows embedded into them. Originally, the house was furnished with artwork collected by the Gordons, even though Wright disdained the idea of artwork on the walls. Among the works in the Gordons' collection were a Japanese woodblock print, a Native American tapestry, and a metal sculpture.

==== First floor ====
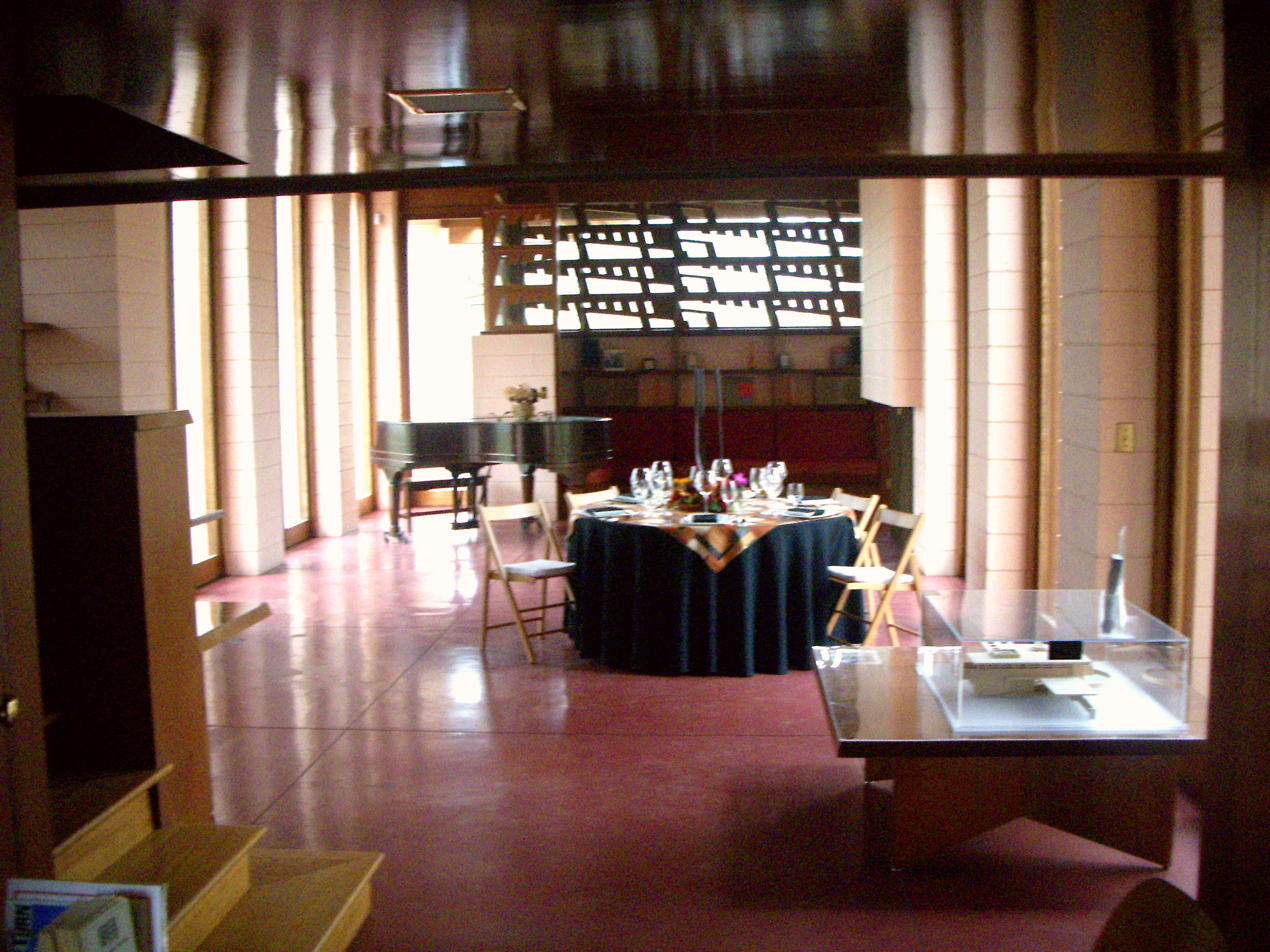
Living room configured for a small event

The first story is accessed by a foyer with a 6-foot-10-inch (2.08 m) ceiling, adjoining a living room with a substantially higher ceiling. Such a feature was common in Wright's designs, which generally included smaller spaces leading to larger rooms. There are also a master bedroom, a utility room, a kitchen, and an office on that story. A radiant heating system is embedded under the first story's concrete floor.

The master bedroom has drawers and closets, in addition to a bathroom and a court on its east wall. To the south, there is a service entrance to the kitchen and to Conrad Gordon's office, which allowed Conrad to access his office without disrupting his family. The kitchen, also known as the workspace, is a double-height space with a ceiling skylight and a counter. The kitchen's wood-paneled refrigerator has a freezer below it, and there are cabinets illuminated by lights underneath. Gordon's former office, which later became the office of the house's director, has a gun cabinet, shelves, a built-in desk, and a file cabinet.

The living room, also known as the great room, has an open plan, a feature also present in many of Wright's other buildings. The room's ceiling measures 12 feet (3.7 m) high, (Note: Other sources give a height of 13 feet (4.0 m) or 16 feet (4.9 m).) with red-cedar ceiling panels placed between ceiling beams of the same material, which are supported by concrete-block piers measuring 2 by 2 feet (0.61 by 0.61 m) across. At the north end of the living room is an entertainment center or library. The house's fireplace, which adjoins the library, is asymmetrical. Just outside the living room are terraces to the west and east, which are continuations of the concrete floor. At the boundaries of each terrace, three steps descend to the ground.

==== Other stories ====
The second-floor bedrooms are situated on the crossbar of the "T", directly above the master bedroom, office, and workspace. On the second floor is a main bathroom that contains a bathtub, a countertop with mirror, and a toilet with attached faucet. The main bathroom is flanked by one bedroom each to the east and west. There is a hallway running along the south side of the second floor, connecting the two bedrooms; one wall of the hallway includes storage space. The bedrooms themselves have desks, bookshelves, and closets built into their walls. The doors, baseboards, cabinets, trim, and paneling in the rooms are made of Western red cedar. In addition, there were originally low platforms for the beds, which were inspired by the beds he had designed for the Imperial Hotel, Tokyo. During the house's construction, Evelyn Gordon had asked Wright to add a space where she could create tapestries with her folding loom; as such, there is space for her loom at the top of the stairs.

In the basement is a boiler, which formerly supplied hot water to the other floors. Pipes under the first story supply hot water to the radiant-heating system under the first floor, and coils in the walls supply hot water to the second floor, where fans circulate heat through the rooms. Since 2011, the house has been heated using treated wastewater from the city of Silverton. There is also a second water heater that provides hot drinking water, as well as an incinerator with a pipe leading from the first-story utility room. Originally, the basement door had markings denoting the height of the Gordons' grandchildren.

== Operation ==
The house is administered by the Gordon House Conservancy, a nonprofit organization established in 2002. Though the house is part of the Oregon Garden, it charges a separate admission fee and has different operating hours from the rest of the garden.

The Gordon House hosts both self-guided and docent-led tours, which generally last 45 minutes. One of the original rooms is used as a lecture hall, while a room next to the foyer displays a documentary film about Wright. More in-depth tours of the Gordon House are also organized one Saturday a month. The house has also hosted other events such as "luncheon teas" (inspired by similar teas that Wright had hosted at his studios), music performances, vintage car shows, arts exhibits, and annual celebrations of Wright's birthday. In addition, the house could be rented out for events. As part of the Night With Wright program, members of the conservancy can stay at the Gordon House overnight in exchange for a $599 donation; the house can accommodate up to four occupants for overnight stays.

== Reception ==
After the house was relocated, a writer for the Bend Bulletin said that "the clean angles are unexpected—yet somehow, not out of place". A reporter for the Statesman Journal described the house as being "a masterpiece of vision and detail" because of its layout and materials, and another writer said in The Columbian that the house's design "is as deceptively simple as Wright's architecture got". A critic for the Corvallis Gazette-Times praised the blurring of the distinction between exterior and interior details, as well as the fact that the lines on the facade seemed to converge in the distance. The history and relocation of the house was detailed in Larry Woodin's 2002 book The Gordon House: A Moving Experience.

== See also ==
- List of Frank Lloyd Wright works
- List of Registered Historic Places in Marion County, Oregon
