= Michigan-Lee Apartments =

- U.S. National Register of Historic Places
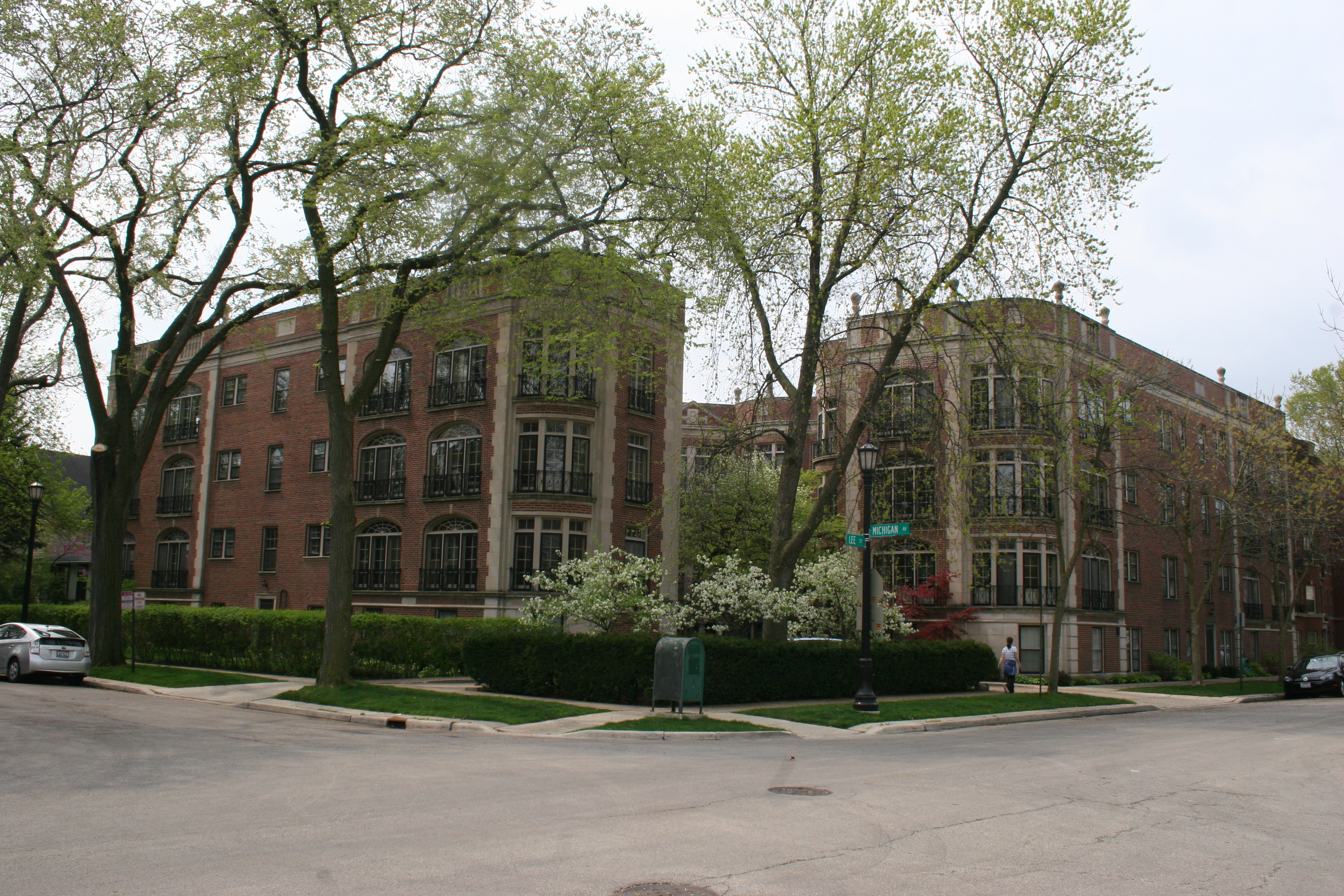
- Michigan-Lee Apartments in 2012

- Location within Chicago metropolitan area Location within Illinois Location within the United States
- Location: 940-950 Michigan Ave., Evanston, Illinois
- Coordinates: 42°02′07″N 87°40′26″W
- Area: 0.4 acres (0.16 ha)
- Built: 1928
- Architect: Frank W. Cauley
- Architectural style: Georgian Revival
- MPS: Suburban Apartment Buildings in Evanston TR
- NRHP reference No.: 84001018
- Added to NRHP: March 15, 1984

Michigan-Lee Apartments is a historic apartment building at 940–950 Michigan Avenue in Evanston, Illinois. The three-story brick building was built in 1928. Architect Frank W. Cauley, who also designed Evanston's Orrington Hotel, designed the building in the Georgian Revival style. The building features entrances flanked by columns, limestone quoins, and a parapet with decorative urns. A sunken courtyard occupies the center of the building; while courtyards were common in Evanston's apartments, the sunken design is unusual within the city.

The building was added to the National Register of Historic Places on March 15, 1984.
