= Amazing Vacation Homes =

- Genre: Travel
- Presented by: Tom Jourden (Seasons 1-2); Didiayer Snyder
- Country of origin: United States
- Original language: English

Production
- Camera setup: Single-camera
- Running time: 22–24 minutes
- Production company: Mike Mathis Productions

Original release
- Network: Travel Channel
- Release: October 6, 2004 – May 6, 2006

Amazing Vacation Homes is a documentary-styled homestead and travel series on the Travel Channel that debuted in October 2004. The first two seasons of the show were hosted by Tom Jourden. In 2006, hosting duties were taken over by Didiayer Snyder, and the number of featured homes was reduced from three to two.

== Synopsis ==
Amazing Vacation Homes focuses on regional homes from around the world which are typically perceived by the American masses as being "bizarre", "unique", or of course, "amazing". In each episode, the host focuses on the homes of a particular country, region, or style. Jourden allowed the owner of the house to show a camera crew around most of the houses, allowing the inhabitants to explain the wonders of the houses. Snyder goes to each house herself and narrates the tour. The program typically shows how the home is procured and where it is located before touring it.

Originally a half-hour documentary titled Amazing Vacation Homes, repeated showings on the Travel Channel drew consistent, considerable audiences.

Among the many "amazing" homes displayed in the show, some of the more amazing homes can be found in: treehouses, lighthouses, and sublime meadows, among many other places.

== Episode guide ==
=== Pilot ===
- Asia: visits Japan, Thailand, and Malaysia

=== Season 1 ===
#	Airdate	Location
1	February 26, 2004	Philippines, Italy
2	March 5, 2005	Morocco, Veliosa
3	March 12, 2006	Ecuador, Iran
4	March 17, 2007	United Kingdom, Alsace
