= Royal Barry Wills =

American architect and author

Royal Barry Wills FAIA
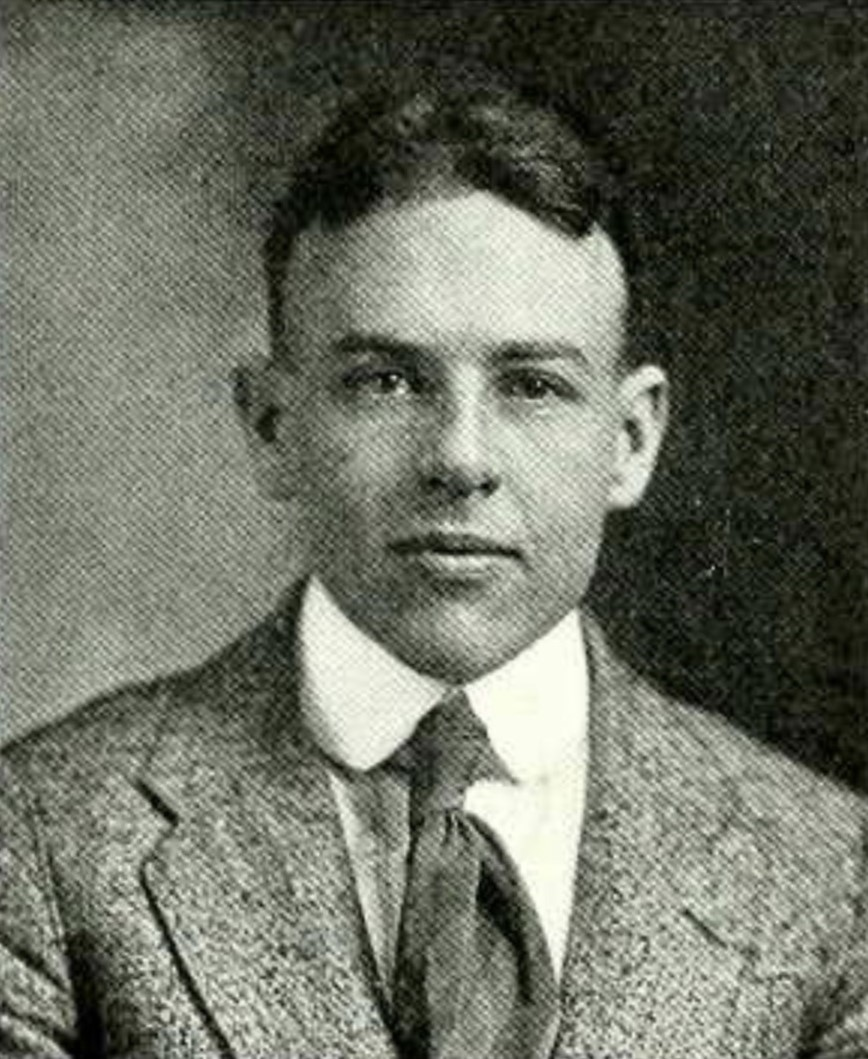
- Born: August 21, 1895; Melrose, Massachusetts
- Died: January 10, 1962 (aged 66); Boston, Massachusetts
- Education: Massachusetts Institute of Technology
- Occupation: Architect
- Known for: Cape Cod style houses

Royal Barry Wills FAIA (August 21, 1895 – January 10, 1962) was an American architect and author. He was a master of the Cape Cod type house, particularly its 1930s–1950s Colonial Revival incarnation. Houses built to his designs continue to fetch a premium.

== Life and work ==
Wills was born in Melrose, Massachusetts, and in 1918 graduated from M.I.T as an architectural engineer. From 1919 until 1925, he worked as a design engineer for the Turner Construction Company of Boston, while engaging in his own architectural practice on the side. To advance his business, he regularly published sketch plans and elevations in the Boston Transcript. He also answered questions from readers about architecture. Commissions followed; he became a registered architect in 1925, opening his own Boston office on lower Beacon Street the same year. With success, his firm moved to Beacon Hill.

The Cape Cod house is ubiquitous in New England and elsewhere, due in part to its simplicity, which sometimes simply means inexpensive, but also allows for versions that achieve a pure elegance due to their restraint and proportions. Wills' artistry brought refinement to every level of planning, engineering and detail of the Cape Cod model. They were low to the ground, with eaves just above the windows, and surmounted by an outsized central chimney (a Wills hallmark). The roof pitch ranged from 8 to 10 inches (200 to 250 mm), vertically, in a 12-inch (300 mm) run. The sash was made up from 24 to 36 individual lights, and clapboards graduated from a 2 3/4-inch exposure at the foundation, to a typical 4 1/4-inch exposure from the top of the window sill to the eave. But most of all, Wills emphasized what he termed "scale"—the relationship of parts to one another that gives a design perfection and charm. And unlike many architects, he offered "partial services", adding to contractor designs without credit.

In 1938, Life Magazine selected four modern architects and four traditional architects, asking them to prepare home designs for families in four income categories. In the category for people with $5,000 to $6,000 incomes, the modern design was by Frank Lloyd Wright and the traditional one by Royal Barry Wills. The family chose the Wills house over the Wright design, and the home was built in Edina, Minnesota. With the motto "no stock plans," Wills designed buildings not only in New England, but from Canada to Florida, including Cape Cods, garrisons, saltboxes, churches, and, in 1941, a 300-unit housing complex for defense workers in Springfield, Massachusetts.

Wills was author of eight books on architecture offering designs and advice. In 1949, he received the Certificate of Honor from the Massachusetts State Association of Architects. In 1954, he was elected a fellow of the American Institute of Architects. In 1957, his firm became Royal Barry Wills Associates, and remains active today. He died in Boston, Massachusetts on January 10, 1962.

"He wanted only to design the indigenous New England house supremely well, and succeeded beyond any other architect."
