= Income bracket =

Categorisation of people by income

An income bracket is a category of people whose income falls within defined upper and lower levels.

In governmental planning, entire populations are divided into income brackets. These brackets are used to categorize demographic data as well as determine levels of taxation and welfare benefits.

== See also ==
- Tax bracket
- Salary packaging
