= Sunken courtyard =

In architecture and landscape architecture, a sunken courtyard, sometimes called a sunken plaza, is a courtyard below ground level.

== Gallery ==
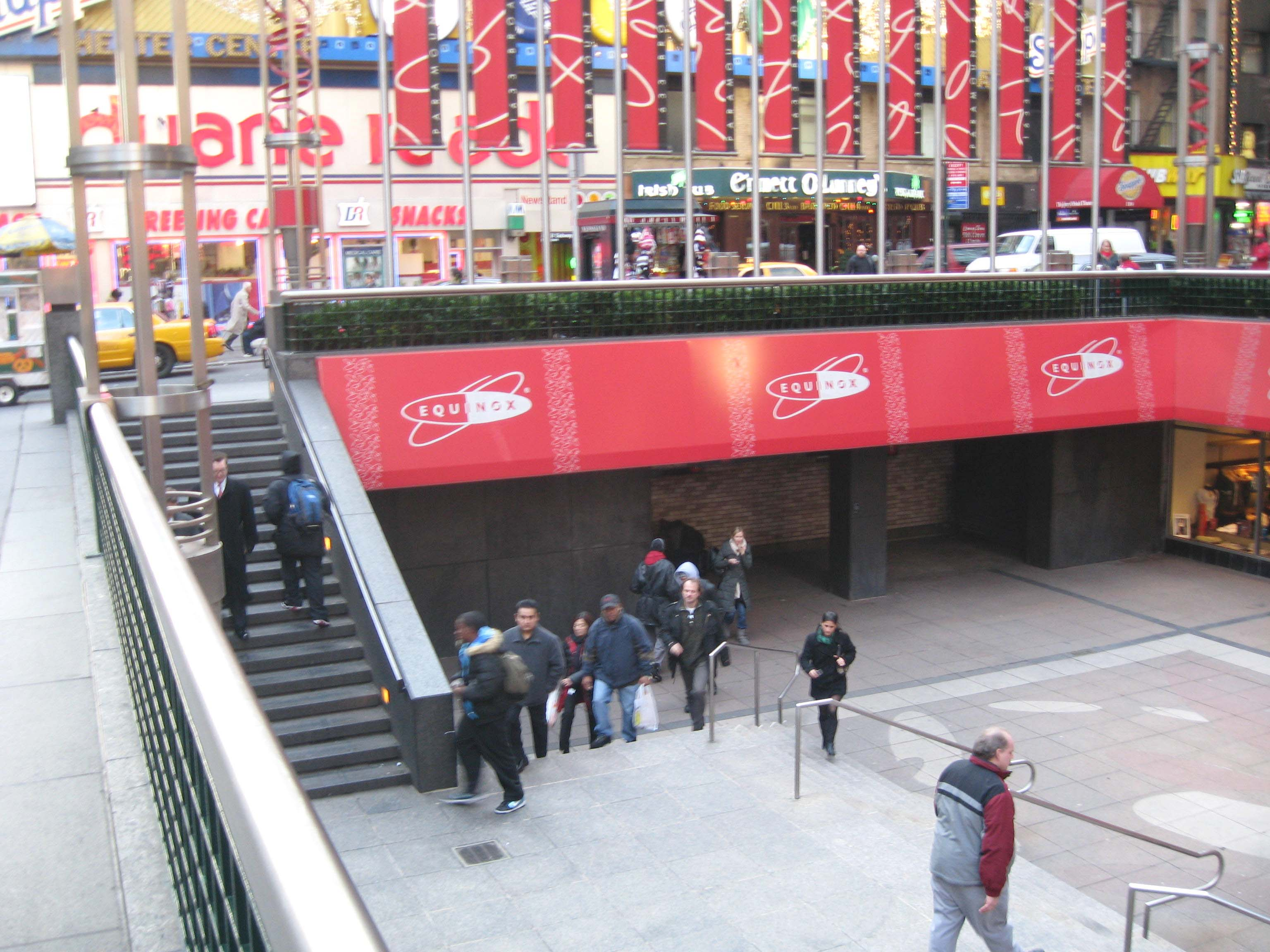
Sunken courtyard of Paramount Plaza, New York City

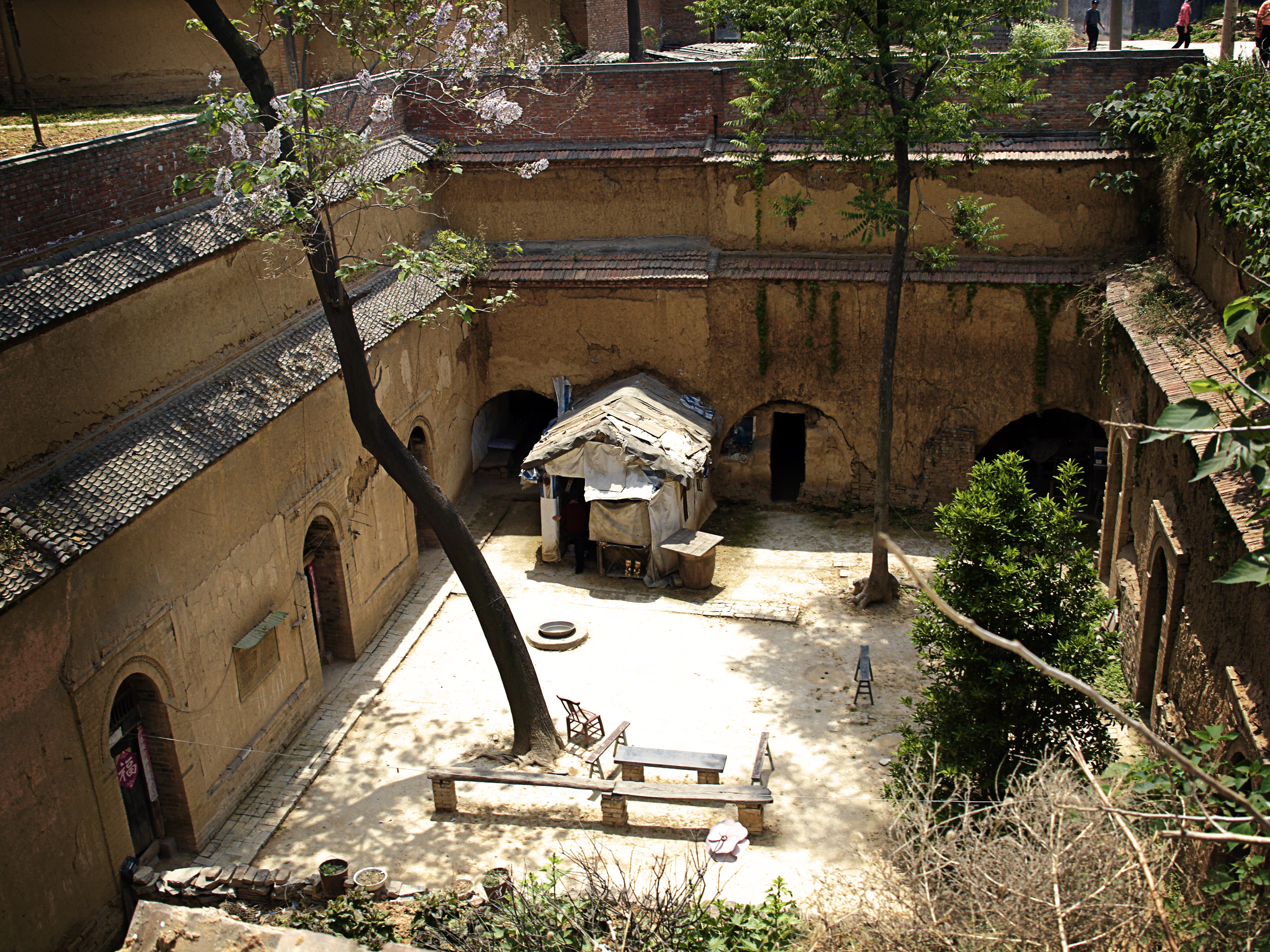
Sunken courtyard in a cave dwelling in Shaanxi, China

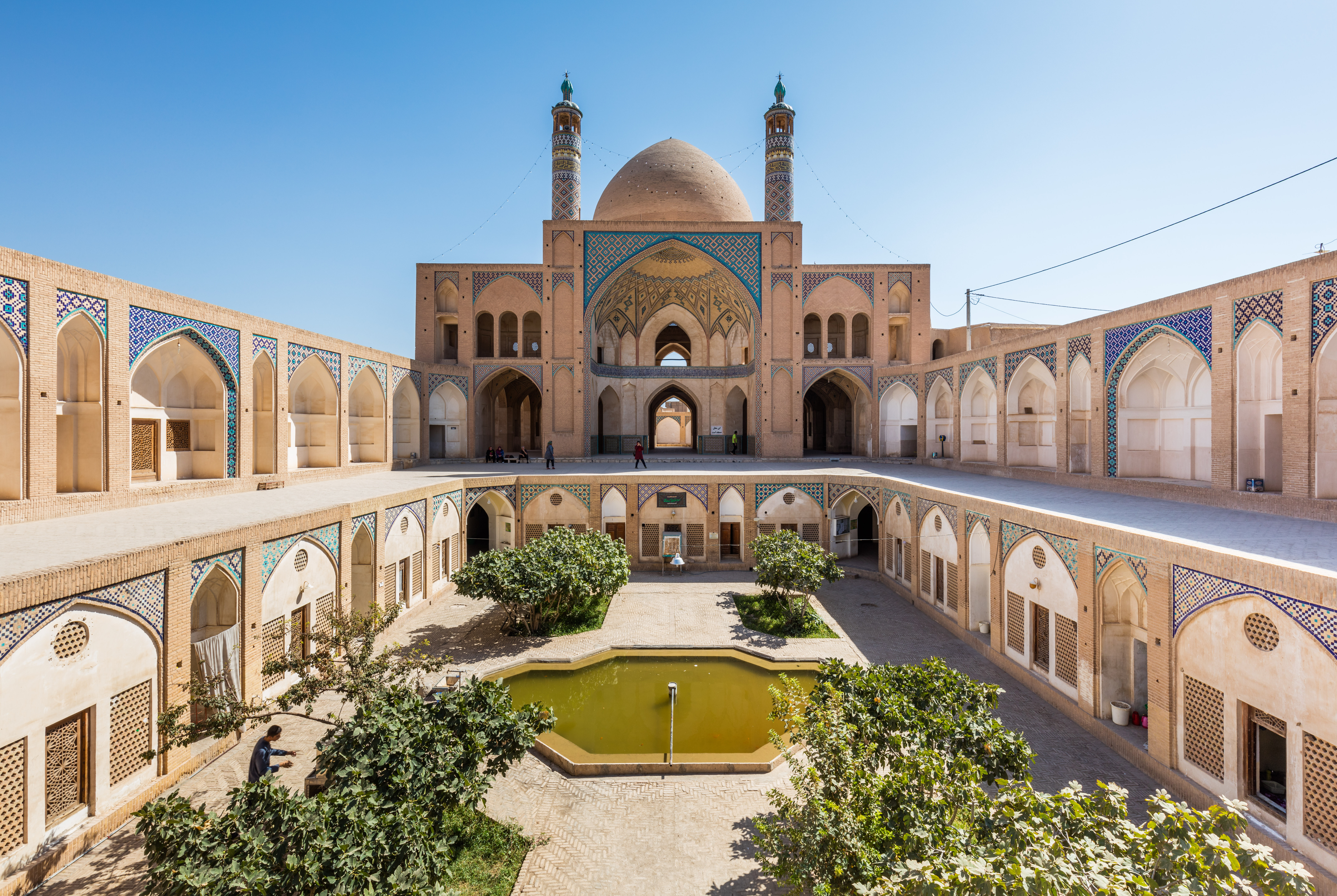
Sunken courtyard in Agha Bozorg mosque, Kashan, Iran
