= Child of the Sun =

University buildings in Lakeland, Florida

- Florida Southern College Architectural District; Child of the Sun
- U.S. National Register of Historic Places
- U.S. National Historic Landmark District
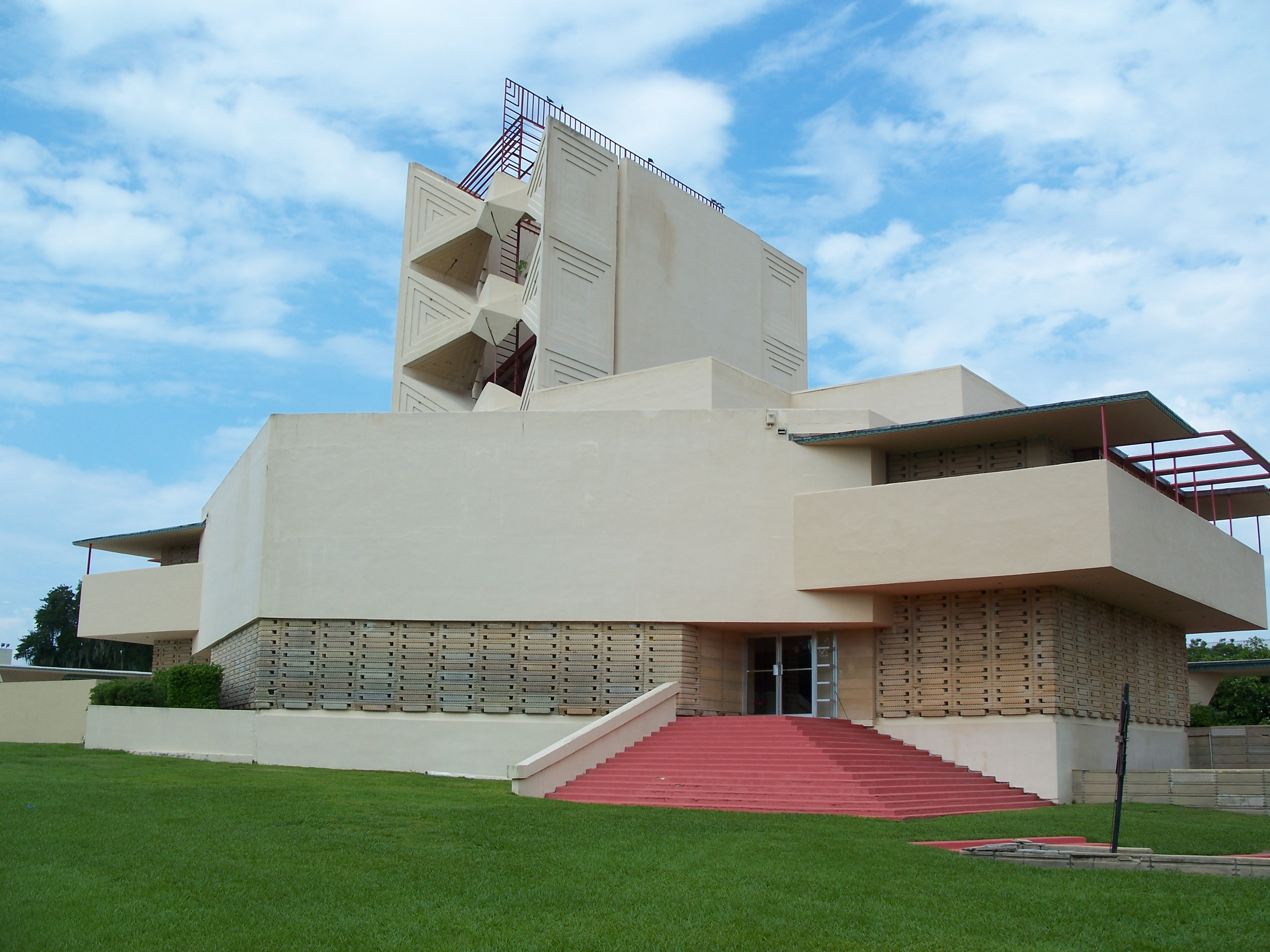
- Pfeiffer Chapel, 2009

- Location within Florida Location within the United States
- Location: Lakeland, Florida, United States
- Coordinates: 28°01′53″N 81°56′53″W
- Area: 100 acres (0.40 km^{2})
- Built: 1941–1958
- Architect: Frank Lloyd Wright
- NRHP reference No.: 75000568

Significant dates
- Added to NRHP: June 11, 1975
- Designated NHLD: March 2, 2012

Child of the Sun is a collection of buildings designed by Frank Lloyd Wright at Florida Southern College's (FSC) West Campus in Lakeland, Florida, United States. It contains twelve designs built during Wright's lifetime, including a set of esplanades and the Water Dome fountain. Two other designs were completed posthumously: a music building and a Usonian house within the Sharp Family Tourism and Education Center. The buildings, listed on the National Register of Historic Places as a National Historic Landmark, together form the largest collection of buildings by Wright at a single location.

Wright's FSC buildings share many stylistic details, differing greatly from previous collegiate buildings and older American styles. They incorporate details such as textile block facades, 30-60-90 triangle motifs, low massings, cantilevered upper stories, flat roofs, skylights, and terraces. Wright's original ten designs include the Pfeiffer and Danforth chapels, two administration buildings, three seminar buildings, the Buckner Building (originally a library), the Ordway Industrial Arts Building, and the Polk County Science Building. Wright intended for his esplanades to both physically and visually connect his structures. Wright's buildings adjoin several neo-Georgian buildings constructed during the 1920s and 1930s, along with later buildings designed by Nils Schweizer.

FSC president Ludd Spivey sought to construct the campus in a more modernistic style after cofounding the E. Stanley Jones Educational Foundation in 1937. Spivey hired Wright to design the campus in 1938. Although Spivey distanced himself from the Jones Foundation, Wright continued designing new buildings for two decades, eventually drawing up 18 designs. Due to chronic funding shortages, the buildings were constructed at different times, many using student labor. After Wright's death in 1959, construction of his designs largely ceased as other architects were selected to complete the campus. Over the years, his buildings have been modified and renovated; the Sharp Family Center was built in 2013.

== Site ==
Child of the Sun is part of the West Campus of Florida Southern College's (FSC) 113-acre (46 ha) campus in Lakeland, Florida, United States. The West Campus occupies a slope along the north shore of Lake Hollingsworth, which ascends about 80 feet (24 m) over a distance of 1/3 mile (0.54 km). There are 12 buildings designed by Frank Lloyd Wright. The structures are roughly bounded by the rest of the campus to the east, the lake to the south, Johnson Avenue to the west, and Frank Lloyd Wright Way (originally McDonald Street) to the north.

The site originally consisted of a grove of citrus trees planted in a grid. Though the grove was replaced with lawns in the 1950s, it inspired the positioning of Wright's buildings. The structures are arranged along paths that intersect at 30-, 60-, or 90-degree angles, or multiples thereof, and are centered around three features: the Water Dome, Pfeiffer Chapel, and Buckner Building. This arrangement contrasted with older college campuses, which tended to be arranged orthogonally (perpendicularly) and arranged around quads, and opened up diagonal views of each building, which orthogonal plans tended to avoid. The campus contains an urn memorializing former FSC president Ludd Spivey's son Allan (who died at age seven), as well as a bust memorializing Wright.

=== Water Dome ===
The West Campus includes the J. Edgar Wall Water Dome. The dome, intended by Wright as one of the campus's focal points, includes a basin completed in 1948 and originally surrounded by fountain jets. The basin measures 160 feet (49 m) in diameter and is tinted aqua, in contrast to Wright's buildings, which used a "Cherokee red" hue. Wright's original design called for the jets to create a dome of water, contrasting with the "arboreal hemicycle", an array of trees surrounding the northern half of the pool. Had the jets functioned as intended, they would have risen 50 feet (15 m) or 80 feet (24 m).

The jets proved technologically infeasible for the 1940s. Sources disagree on whether the jets sprayed everywhere or were just never turned on. In the 1960s, the Water Dome's basin was split into several smaller basins, (Note: Sources disagree on whether the Water Dome became three or four ponds.) and the jets were removed, as was the arboreal hemicycle. The Water Dome was rebuilt in 2007 as a modification of the original design. Surrounding the restored basin are 74 or 76 jets, which measure 40 to 45 feet (12 to 14 m) or 60 feet (18 m) tall. The fountains operate four times a day.

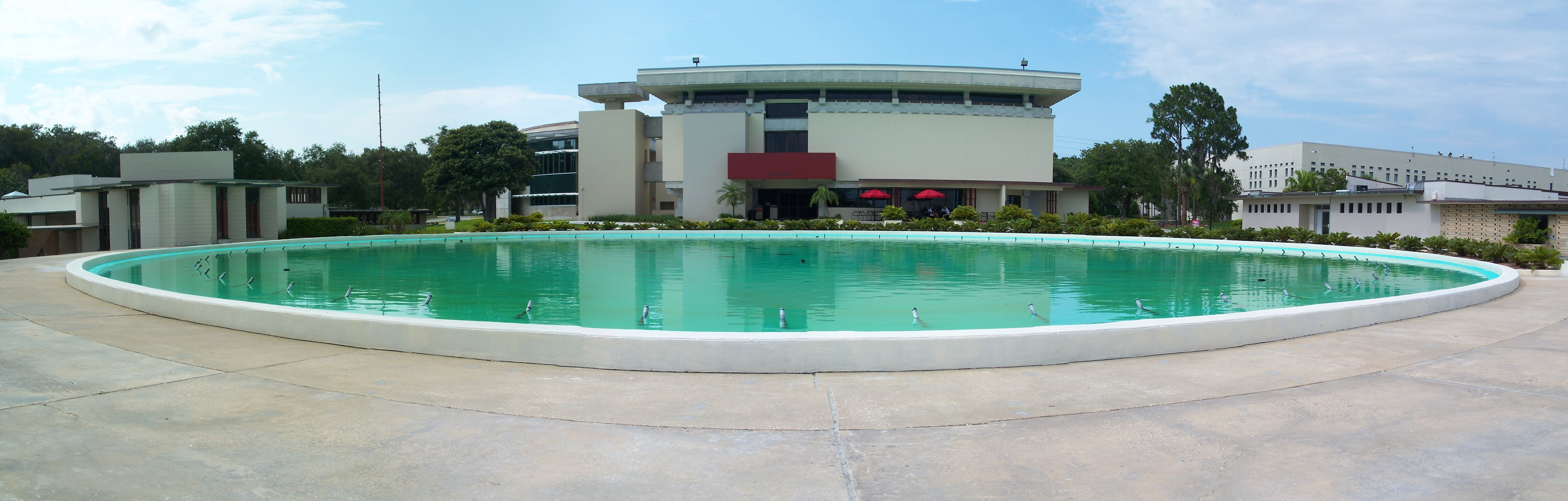
Water Dome pool

=== Esplanades ===
Wright designed 1.5 miles (2.4 km) of covered esplanades for the campus, which were not constructed to their full length. Built between 1940 and 1958, the esplanades connect all except one of the buildings. The only building not connected to an esplanade, the Danforth Chapel, abuts another building that does, the Pfeiffer Chapel. As planned, the esplanades cut through the citrus groves; one of Wright's biographers, Robert McCarter, likened the esplanades to "passages through a forest". The esplanades were also intended to visually blend with Wright's buildings, and Wright wanted passersby to enjoy views of his buildings from the esplanades. Functionally, they are similar to the pergolas in some of Wright's other projects, including the Darwin D. Martin House, Westcott House, Hollyhock House, and Taliesin West, as well as to the cloisters at the University of Virginia and Stanford University campuses. The esplanades' presence helped influence the construction of covered walkways in schools across Florida.

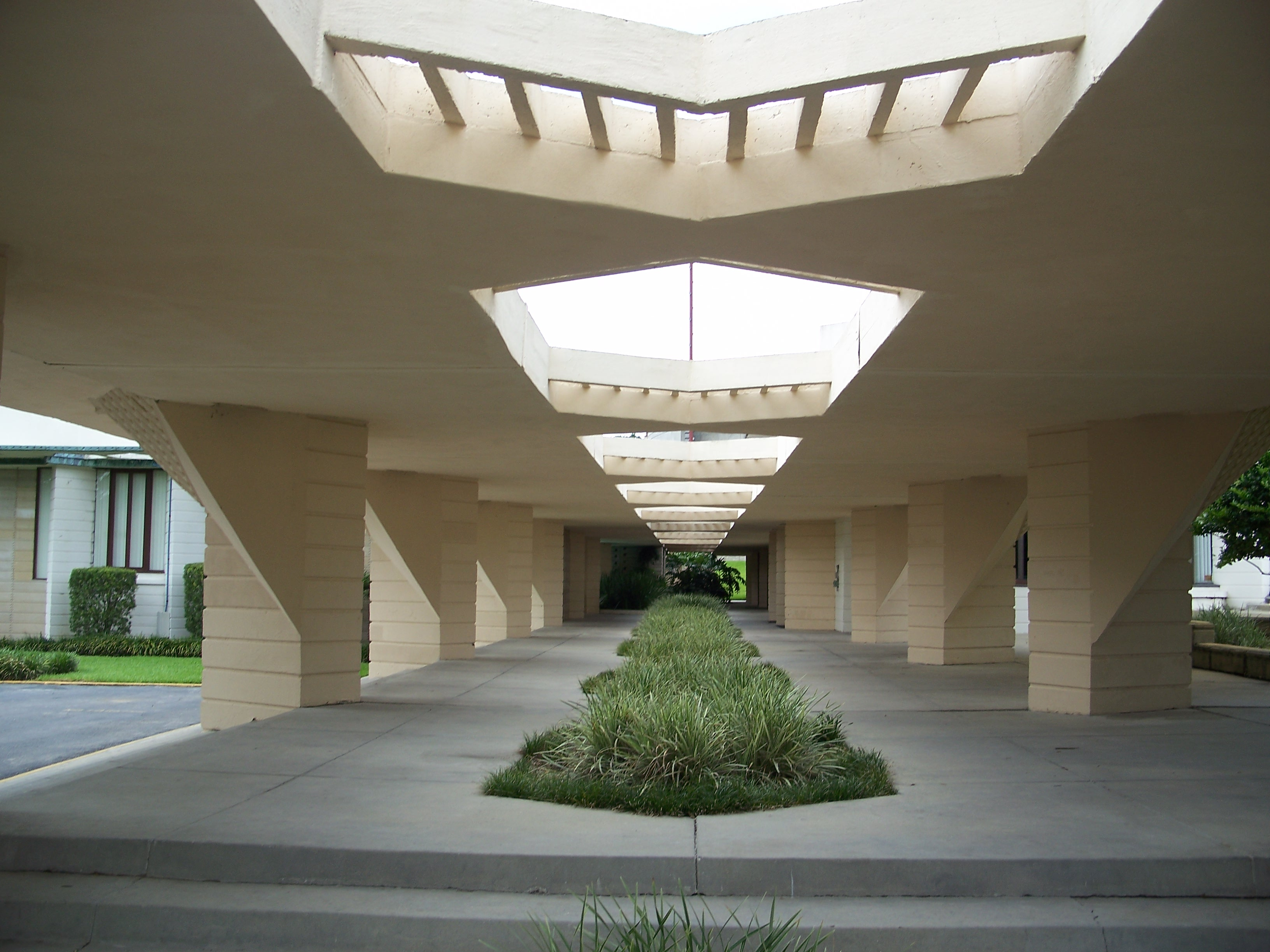
Section of esplanade next to the administration buildings

The esplanades are supported by columns measuring 18 feet (5.5 m) apart, the same spacing as the original orange trees. The columns have motifs that resemble trees, and several of the columns honor people affiliated with FSC. The esplanades' canopies are low to the ground, which Wright intended would give the esplanades a more human scale. They are cantilevered outward from the columns and are as low as 6 3/4 feet (2.1 m). Where the paths slope up or down, the canopies change elevation in a zigzagging pattern. The canopies have stamped copper decorations at their edges, which are designed to drip water to the ground. Due to material shortages during construction, some canopies use concrete painted to resemble copper.

The esplanades are mostly freestanding structures, though some sections run through the walls of several buildings. The section of the esplanade leading to the Watson and Fine administration buildings is 36 feet (11 m) wide, twice the width of the other esplanades. The administration buildings' esplanade has a central trellis in the ceiling, under which are diamond-shaped planting beds.

== Architecture ==
Ludd Spivey commissioned Frank Lloyd Wright to create 18 designs for the West Campus, (Note: The count of 12 completed designs (out of 18 total) is sometimes attributed as the number of buildings. Wright's designs include the Water Dome and esplanades, both of which were completed. Excluding those, he designed 16 buildings, 10 of which were completed. Different figures are also cited: 18 designs (11 completed); 18 designs (7 completed); 24 designs (12 completed)) of which 12 were built during Wright's lifetime, representing about a third of the campus's total structures. The 12 completed designs include 10 buildings, (Note: Some sources cite a total of 7 buildings, as the administration buildings and seminar buildings are sometimes counted as one. A 1996 article in The Ledger describes the campus as having 12 designs, but labels only 9 distinct structures (7 buildings, along with the esplanades and Water Dome).) along with the esplanades and the Water Dome. The Wright designs' nickname "Child of the Sun" is derived from Wright's description of the buildings as having come "out of the ground and into the light, a child of the sun"; some official signs on the campus apply this name to the entire site. Wright's designs were also known as the "college of tomorrow". Because of the presence of the buildings, FSC branded its own campus as "the world's most beautiful campus" by the 1950s.

Other buildings on the West Campus include seven earlier buildings designed by Frederick H. Trimble, along with later structures designed by Wright apprentice Nils Schweizer. A Usonian faculty house, one of Wright's six unbuilt designs, was built posthumously (see Child of the Sun § Sharp Family Tourism and Education Center). These other architects' buildings are not connected by the esplanades.

=== Wright structures ===
Wright's original master plan

Child of the Sun was the largest building complex Wright ever designed for a single client at one location; the village of Oak Park, Illinois, has more Wright–designed buildings, albeit for different clients. The West Campus was his largest single commission since the Imperial Hotel, Tokyo, in 1922, and was one of two commissions he took in Florida, the other being the Lewis House in Tallahassee. Along with his Taliesin West studio in Arizona, the West Campus was one of Wright's two major commissions in the late 1930s, as most of his work during that era comprised lower-cost Usonian houses for middle-class families. The West Campus is the only college campus Wright designed in his lifetime. It also includes two of his seven religious designs, (Note: The others are Pilgrim Congregational Church (California), Unity Temple (Illinois), Beth Sholom Synagogue (Pennsylvania), and the First Unitarian Society of Madison and Greek Orthodox Church of the Annunciation (Wisconsin).) the first he had designed since Unity Temple over three decades earlier. Many buildings are named for people who had facilitated their construction.

Stylistically, Wright's FSC buildings differed greatly from brick and stone collegiate buildings designed in traditional styles such as the Gothic or Tudor. Wright regarded the campus's existing buildings as "boxes with holes in them", and he did not want to use an older American style (such as the Spanish Colonial Revival and Mediterranean Revival styles predominant in Florida), viewing such styles as unoriginal. Wright wanted to create the campus in a specifically American style, refining many details from his earlier Broadacre City design. The FSC buildings incorporate geometric shapes based on 30-60-90 triangles, an allusion to the campus's grid, and are built around grids of 6-by-6-foot (1.8 by 1.8 m) squares. Their massings (shapes) are constructed low to the ground. Many buildings have cantilevered upper stories and flat roofs; the roofs have copper edges similar to those on the esplanades. Pools, gardens, and terraces are also commonplace, along with low ceilings and red-and-green accents. Wright used skylights and clerestory windows to provide natural lighting.

Wright used locally-sourced materials, which were shared between different designs. For example, the buildings are clad with textile blocks, similar to those in his earlier textile block houses in California. The blocks use a mixture of coquina (crushed shells) and sand from Florida; the sand comes from St. Augustine on the state's east coast, since the sand from the site was unsuitable for construction. Each block is 9 by 36 inches (230 by 910 mm) across, linked to adjacent blocks using steel rods; and incorporates multicolored cast glass cubes into its surface. The textile blocks created what some sources called a Mayan feel. Other concrete was poured in place, and the buildings also use materials such as red tidewater cypress, steel, copper, and glass. In response to criticisms that the materials looked unpolished, Wright said that he intended them that way because "nature doesn't polish things off".

Wright used organic architecture details extensively. Full-height windows, along with plants inside many buildings, were used to visually connect indoor and outdoor spaces. The building shapes were themselves influenced by topographic features, another tenet of Wright's organic architecture. He largely avoided using wood or stone because it did not match Florida's flat topography. Most of the buildings are low to the ground, except Pfeiffer Chapel, which has a tower. Wright conversely did not adjust his designs to meet practical needs. For instance, Wright told Spivey to move his desk in response to a complaint about leaky roofs, and librarians secretly ordered desk lamps (which were hidden during Wright's visits) because the original Roux Library was too dark.

Structure name	Location	Building type	Date completed, expanded	Notes
Annie Pfeiffer Chapel	28°01′51″N 81°56′55″W	Chapel	1941, 1945	
Administration buildings: Benjamin Fine Building; Emile E. Watson Building	28°01′56″N 81°56′58″W	Administration	1948	
Esplanades	Various	Not a building	1940–1958	
L. A. Raulerson Building – Seminar buildings: Cora Carter Seminar; Charles W. Hawkins Seminar; Isabel Walbridge Seminar	28°01′56″N 81°56′54″W	Educational	1941	Non-contributing property to NRHP district
Lucius Pond Ordway Industrial Arts Building	28°01′57″N 81°56′49″W	Educational	1952	
Polk County Science Building	28°01′50″N 81°56′52″W	Educational	1958	
Thad Buckner Building (originally E. T. Roux Library)	28°01′53″N 81°56′57″W	Administration	1948	
Water Dome	28°01′55″N 81°56′56″W	Not a building	1948, 2007	Non-contributing property to NRHP district
William H. Danforth Chapel	28°01′50″N 81°56′56″W	Chapel	1955	

==== Pfeiffer Chapel ====
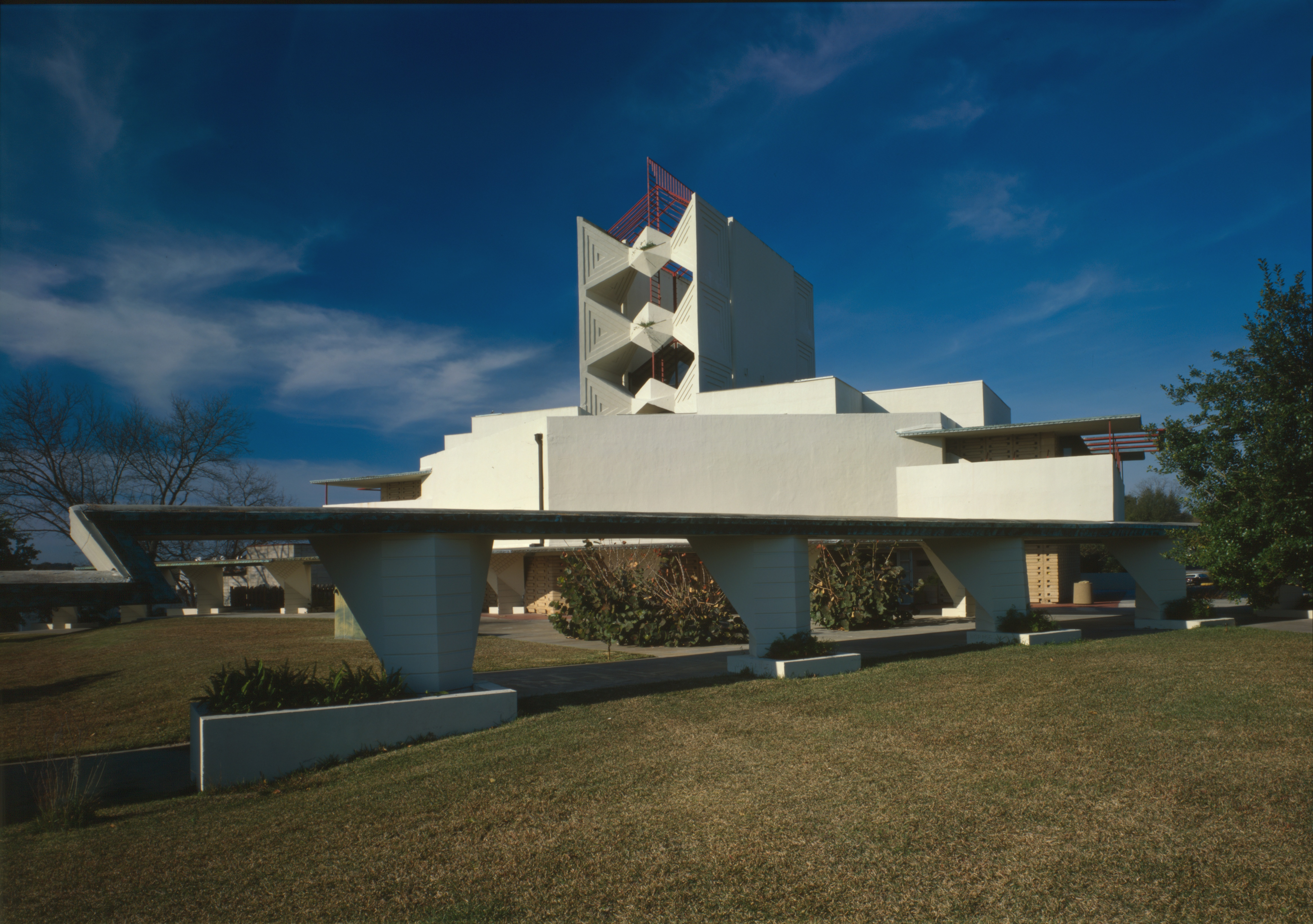
Pfeiffer Chapel

Annie Pfeiffer Chapel, completed 1941, is a two-story structure spanning 11,000 square feet (1,000 m^{2}). It has a hexagonal plan measuring 80 by 85 feet (24 by 26 m) across. The Pfeiffer Chapel was intended as one of the Wright campus's focal points, given FSC's status as a religious college. It uses materials such as textile blocks and concrete. Wright said the materials were intended "to bring God's outdoors into man's indoors", and House Beautiful wrote that the materials were used "as a means to gain the desired atmosphere".

The tower, which students nicknamed "God's bicycle rack", was originally planned to rise 85 feet (26 m). The tower was originally substantially shorter (Note: Sources give the original tower's height as 40 feet (12 m), 60 feet (18 m), or 65 feet (20 m).) but, after collapsing in the 1944 Cuba–Florida hurricane, was rebuilt at 65 feet (20 m). The tower's superstructure consists of concrete slabs, with diagonal steel beams for bracing, and is carried by four concrete piers. The tower's exterior walls use double-triangle motifs extensively, including in its bowtie-shaped bracing. The walls surround five skylights, which were originally installed close to the ground. Above the skylights, the tower was intended to function as a carillon, with groups of spherical bells; the tower conducted sound so well that residents complained, leading to the bells' removal. After 1944, the piers were strengthened, and the skylights were raised. Balconies extend north and south from the tower, and a wall protrudes from it, functioning as both a structural support and a trellis for vines. There are flower boxes at the steeple, but they were difficult to irrigate and were left vacant.

Wright clad the facade with textile blocks. About 6,000 blocks with 46 distinct designs are used. The blocks on the chapel's lower section are solid and made of poured concrete, while those on the tower's upper section have perforations; the middle section had the plainest designs because, as built, it was concealed behind the branches of nearby trees. Approximately 50,000 glass cubes are inlaid into the textile blocks, but there are otherwise no windows. As built, the perforated walls were intended to allow natural breezes to pass through the building, but this proved unworkable because of the warm climate. Instead, a boiler was installed in the chapel, with copper pipes beneath the floor and a flue in one pier, while air-conditioning ducts were added. At ground level, the glass entrance doors originally had Florida cypress frames, later replaced with aluminum frames.

The Pfeiffer Chapel has about 1,000 seats on two levels: 540 on the main level and 460 in a balcony. The chapel includes design features that Wright had proposed in earlier auditoriums and, in particular, closely resembles Wright's unbuilt New Theater in Woodstock, New York. The balcony level is inspired by a design he had created for his Taliesin studio in Wisconsin, and the chapel has four thick, square columns and is accessed from the sides of the pulpit, similar to the layout at Unity Temple in Illinois. Instead of traditional church pews, the chapel has individual seats, originally fitted with cushions. The original seats have since been replaced with metal seats, and some of the balcony seating was removed for exhibit space. The seats face the pulpit, which is raised substantially above the floor. The original pulpit was made of red cypress, with a slanted prow, and was flanked by planters. The pulpit was replaced with a stage after the 1960s. Behind the former pulpit is a choir screen, which measures 90 feet (27 m) high and is made of concrete blocks.

==== Raulerson Building ====
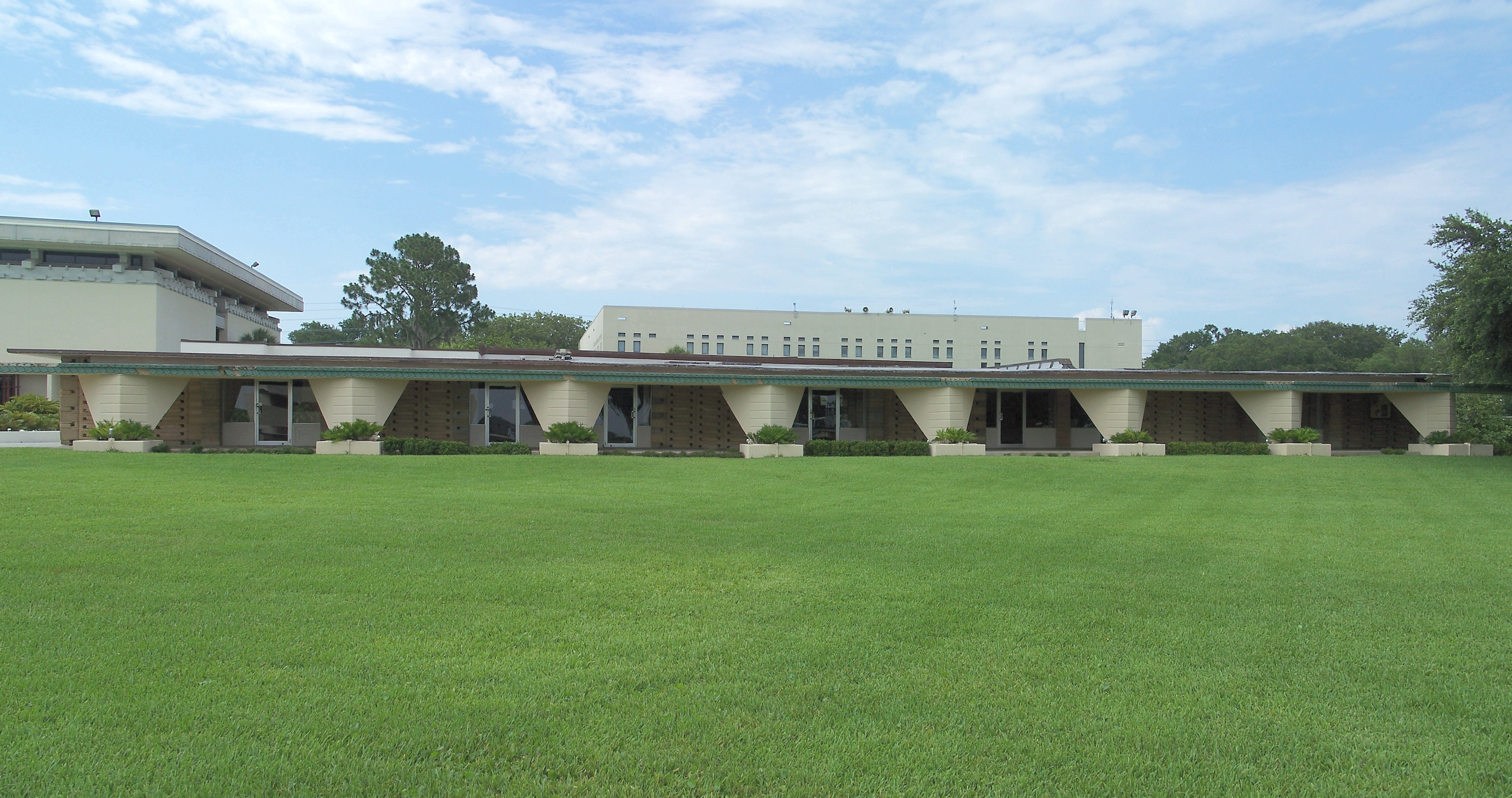
The Raulerson Building

The Carter, Walbridge, and Hawkins seminar buildings, opened in 1941 as separate structures, form the L. A. Raulerson Building. Wright originally wanted to build seven seminar buildings, which he reasoned would eliminate the need for a large, boxy classroom structures. As built, there are three seminar buildings just east of the Water Dome; they are arranged in a straight line and were originally separated by outdoor courtyards. The walls have textile-block facades with few window openings, receiving natural light from cubes embedded into the blocks. Some textile blocks are of different colors because Wright was testing out different forms of concrete when they were being built; he eventually decided on a cream-colored tan. For cross-ventilation, Wright incorporated perforated blocks at the perimeters of each wing.

Each seminar building is a single 36-by-36-foot-wide (11 by 11 m) square, further subdivided into square units measuring 3 by 3 feet (0.91 by 0.91 m) wide. The buildings contain T-shaped corridors, dividing two offices on one side and a classroom on the other. Ventilation openings are incorporated within sidelights and doors to assist with cross-ventilation. When the courtyards were enclosed in 1958–1959, the three seminar buildings became one structure. A cinder-block wing was added to the Walbridge Building's northwest corner in 1964–1965, and two physically separate additions built next to the Carter and Hawkins buildings in the 1990s.

==== Administration buildings ====
The Watson Administration Building as seen from the west

The connected Emile E. Watson and Benjamin Fine administration buildings, opened 1948, are just west of the Water Dome, flanking one arm of the esplanade. They are sometimes characterized as one building, though their respective interior spaces are not connected. The Fine Building to the east, adjoining the western curve of the Water Dome, is smaller than the Watson Building to the west. The Fine Building is placed off-center from the Water Dome. A 1,200-square-foot (110 m^{2}) annex, dating from 1955, is attached to the Fine Building's north side.

Both structures are two stories high and have similar designs, including solid and perforated textile blocks on their facade, as well as roofs cantilevered outward from the facade. The Watson Building has a U-shaped layout surrounding a courtyard with vegetation. The Fine Building's facade, meanwhile, contains piers with rhombus-shaped cross sections, which support the roof and are flanked by full-height casement windows. The corners of the Fine Building's facade are clad with textile blocks, and the soffit of its roof has square-within-a-square motifs. Inside, the Watson Building are offices of college executives—including several deans and the president—along with a conference space. The Fine Building's interior has bursar's and registrar's offices, accessed by a two-story lobby with a balcony running diagonally above it. The buildings maintain their original function, though the windows have been shortened, and a second-floor balcony on the Watson Building's eastern elevation has been enclosed.

==== Buckner Building ====
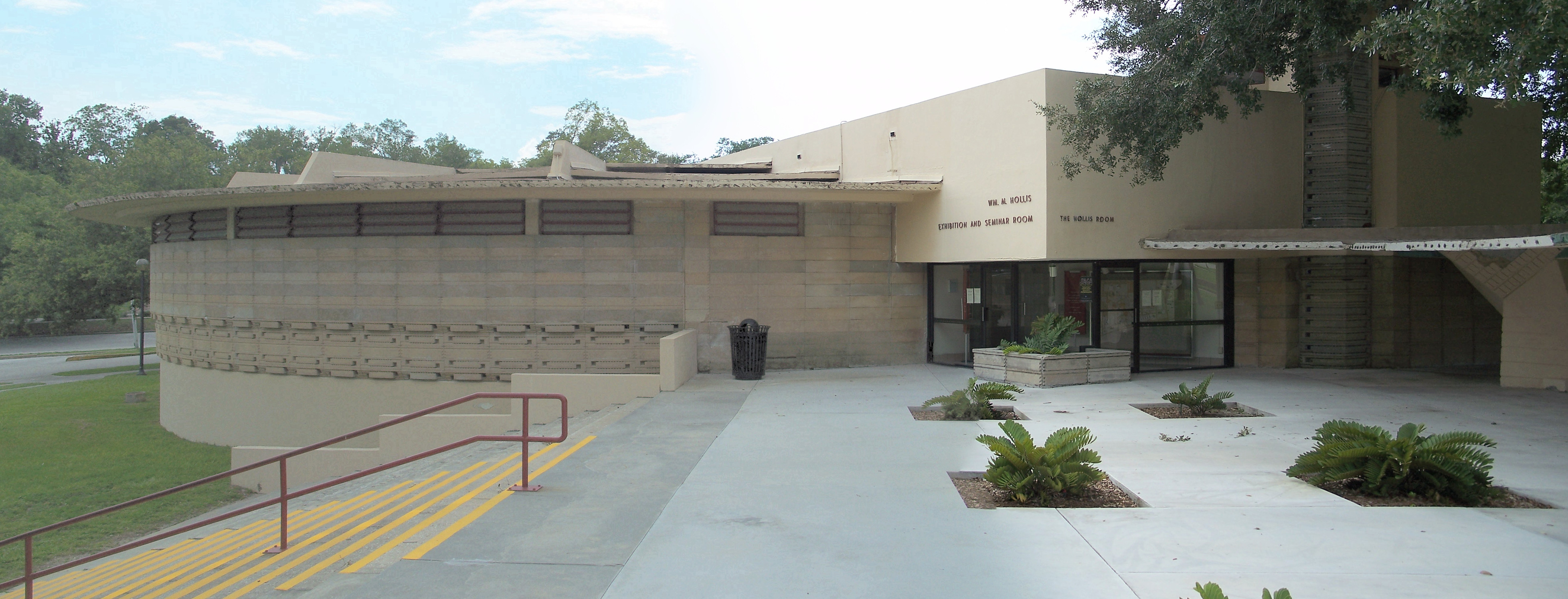
Exterior of the Buckner Building

The Thad Buckner Building, completed in 1948 as the first E. T. Roux Library, was also intended as one of the campus's focal points. It consists of two attached sections: a circular reading room and a hexagonal library stacks. In both sections of the building, the walls are made of concrete blocks. Structural support is provided by reinforced concrete, and the building has expansive column-free spaces inside. The reading room was the first design where he implemented a circular floor plan, although the idea of an attached circle and hexagon dates to 1923, when Wright designed the uncompleted Little Dipper theater at Hollyhock House. The Buckner Building also includes a 900-square-foot (84 m^{2}) annex at its northeast corner, dating from 1956.

The two-story reading room measures 90 feet (27 m) in diameter. Its exterior has a concrete foundation, and there are also structural ribs at the reading room's perimeter. Above the reading room is a concrete roof with several levels separated by clerestory windows, the room's only source of natural light. Inside are three levels of terraces, descending toward the center. The terraces originally had curved reading tables, which doubled as bookcases. These surrounded a circulation desk at the center. A fireplace is placed behind the former circulation desk. Though the walls were originally painted white to reflect natural light, the poorly-lit interiors required desk lamps. The Buckner Building's reading room became an exhibit room in 1968 and was equipped with a visitor center in 1992. During the visitor center's construction, columns were added under the room's second-floor balcony, and the balcony's parapet was replaced with a wall.

The stacks wing is three stories high and has a floor plan measuring about 90 by 50 feet (27 by 15 m) across. It has perforated blocks on its eastern elevation. The roof protrudes from the facade and originally had five skylights, which illuminated lightwells inside. All three levels contained stacks; the basement also included a private chapel and a restroom, and the first floor also had a librarian's office. The second floor extends into the reading room's balcony. The stacks could originally accommodate 150,000 or 200,000 books. Functionally, the stacks wing was ill-suited for its purpose; the skylights provided excessive natural light, which along with a lack of air-conditioning was unsuitable for the preservation of old volumes. The stacks were converted into offices in 1968, and three of the five skylights were removed in 1992.

==== Ordway Industrial Arts Building ====
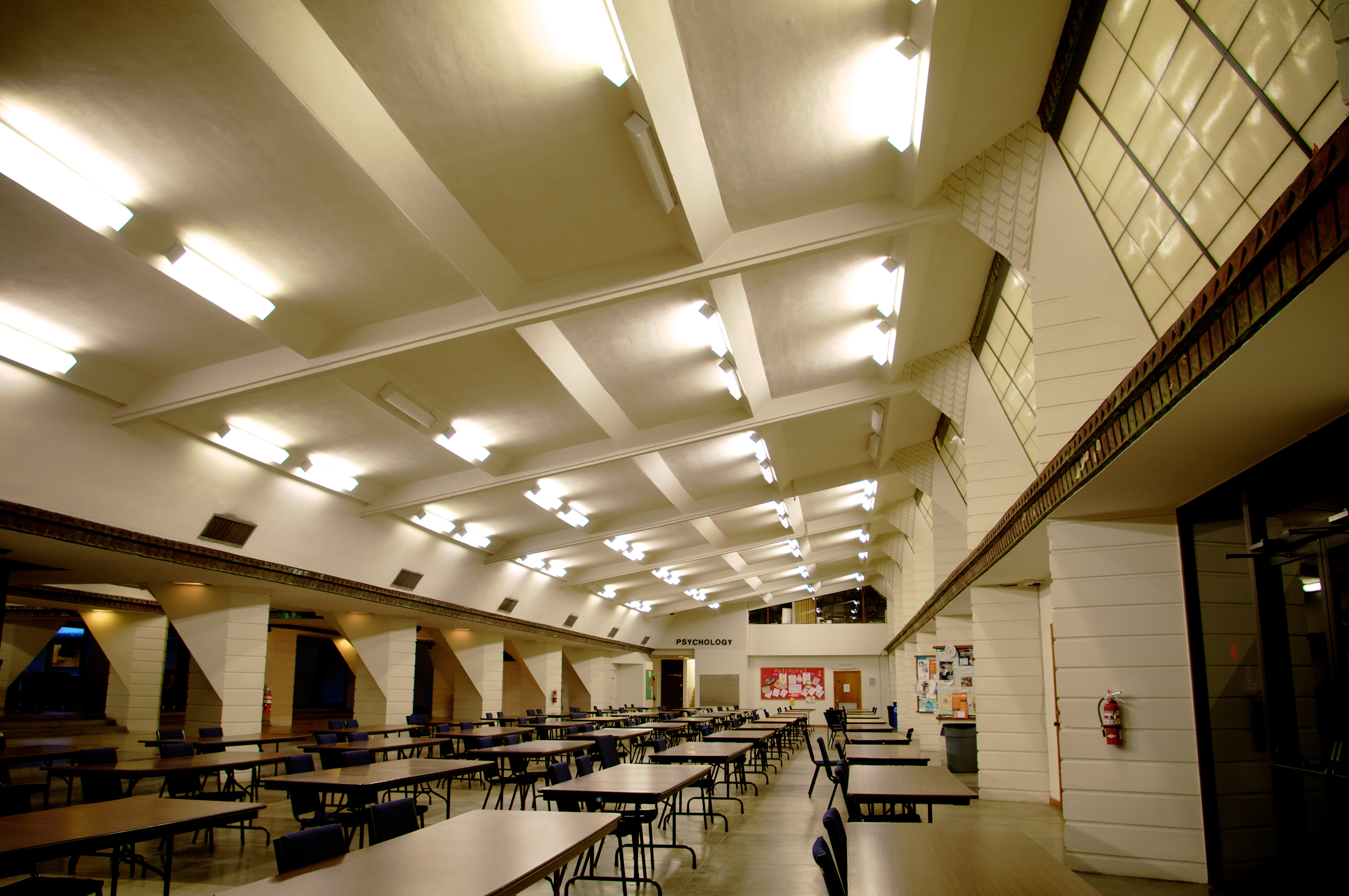
Ordway Building

The Lucius Pond Ordway Industrial Arts Building, opened 1952, is a one-story structure for fine arts, home economics, and industrial arts courses. It runs in a "U" shape, forming the north, south, and east sides of a rectangle, while an esplanade forms the west side. The columns on the Ordway Building's facade repeat the design motifs of the esplanade's columns. The southern elevation has a large glass wall. This wall originally illuminated the Zimmermann Lounge inside, although the lounge has since been subdivided into classrooms and offices. The roof angles inward at a 30-degree angle to illuminate the classrooms inside, similar to a sloped roof Wright used for his drafting room at the Taliesin West studio in Arizona.

A central wing runs northward from the southern arm, creating enclosed courtyards to the east and west. The central wing's northern end terminates at an amphitheater. The central wing's amphitheater (originally known as the Fletcher Theater) has clerestory windows and an inverted-saucer dome ceiling. Originally fitted with movable chairs, the Fletcher Theater was subsequently converted into a black box theater. The rest of the central wing has classrooms and a security office. Wright had considered the Ordway Building his finest design, saying it was "strong and adapted to its purpose" to a greater degree than any other design he had devised.

==== Danforth Chapel ====
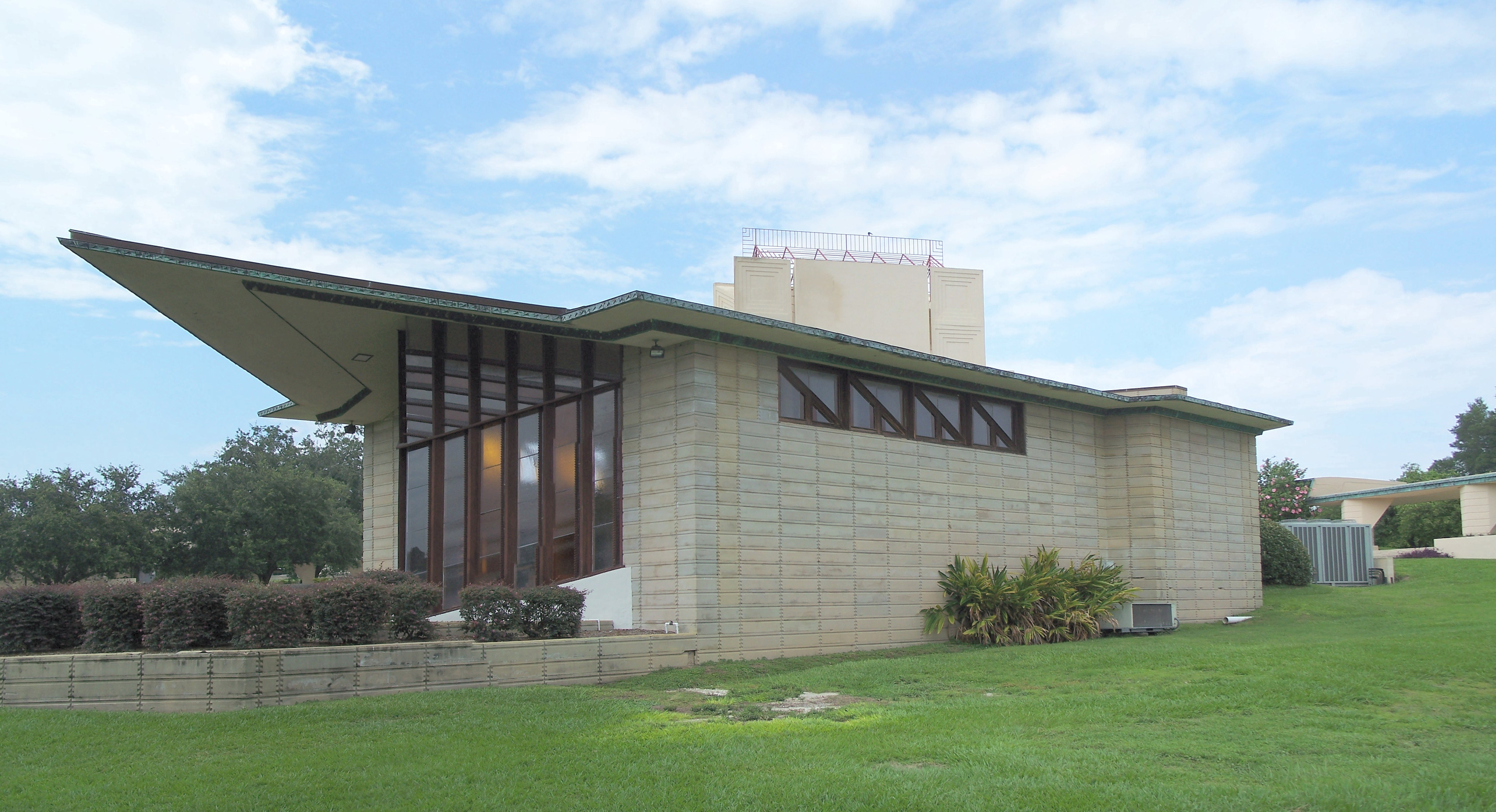
Danforth Chapel's protruding pointed roof

William H. Danforth Chapel, opened 1955, adjoins Pfeiffer Chapel to the southwest, and is rotated 30 degrees clockwise from due south. Danforth Chapel's facade uses leaded stained-glass windows, a material not used anywhere else on campus. The main entrance is at the northeastern elevation, where the chapel retains its original tidewater-cypress doors and woodwork. The side (northwestern and southeastern) elevations are clad with textile blocks, which have inlaid amber-colored glass shards. The southwestern elevation contains full-height leaded glass windows, above which is a pointed roof overhang, similar in appearance to a ship's prow. The roof itself has a shallow gable.

The interior is decorated with Wright-designed furnishings, such as benches. The interior walls all meet at oblique angles. The building's rear (southwest) entrance leads to a foyer, which in turn leads to the main worship area, a space with movable benches surrounding a pulpit. The pulpit is placed directly in front of the leaded glass windows. A mezzanine protrudes into the main worship area, facing the pulpit. Also within the building are classroom and meeting areas and a chaplain's office. Two of these rooms—a hexagonal classroom and an office for FSC's religious department—led to an exterior balcony. Many original decorations, including the pews and a fireplace, remain intact.

==== Polk County Science Building ====
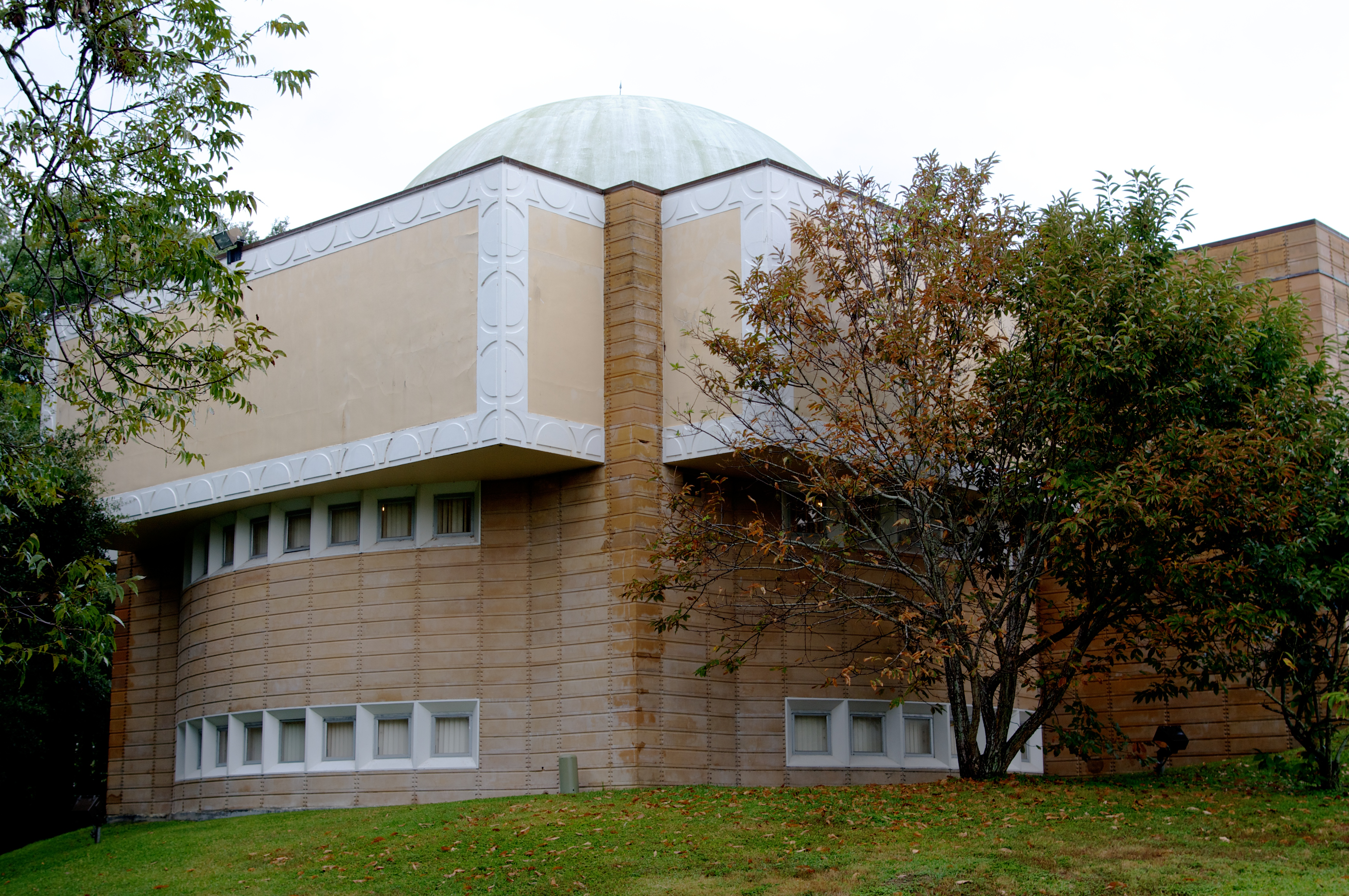
Polk County Science Building, which contains Wright's only planetarium design

The Polk County Science Building, completed 1958, is oriented 30 degrees counterclockwise from due south, occupying a downward slope toward the lake. The building has an L-shaped footprint. (Note: The Science Building is incorrectly cited in National Park Service 2012, p. 11, as a rectangular building.) It is the largest of Wright's buildings at FSC, measuring at least 300 feet (91 m) long; some sources from its construction cited its length as 408 feet (124 m). A shorter wing extends about 100 feet (30 m) perpendicularly from the main structure's northern end. It is variously cited as measuring two or three stories high; due to the changing floor levels, The New York Times said that "a visitor probably could walk about it all day without being sure how many interior levels there are". The northern wing is one story high and is lowered 4 feet (1.2 m) into the ground, with a flat roof and clerestory windows.

The facade is clad with textile blocks, which are covered with stucco in several locations, and incorporate copper and aluminum details. An esplanade is embedded into the western elevation, and an aluminum loggia is on the eastern elevation. At the building's south end is a planetarium with a concrete-shell roof. Measuring 42 feet (13 m) high, the planetarium was the only one Wright ever designed.

Inside, the building is divided into four or five sections, each for a different department. These sections contain a combined 18 offices, 36 classrooms, and several lecture rooms. Also included is a glass-enclosed exhibition area adjacent to the eastern esplanade. An open atrium, rising two stories, extends north–south through the building. The planetarium could seat 75 people, and its interior measures 32 feet (9.8 m) in diameter and 24 feet (7.3 m) from floor to ceiling. Beneath the planetarium is an orrery, or solar system model, at ground level. The eastern elevation also had a 160-foot-long (49 m) greenhouse, designed by Schweizer, between 1967 and 2000.

==== Other Wright designs ====
Six of Wright's designs remained incomplete when he died in 1959, including the Music Building, which was then under development. The plans at the time called for two performance chambers of different sizes—a 2,500-seat circular auditorium and a smaller rehearsal venue—connected by a loggia flanked by classrooms, rehearsal rooms, and offices. The exterior would have been similar to that of the Buckner Building. Henry-Russell Hitchcock wrote that the Music Building's design would have "illustrate[d] the serenity that [Wright] insists must go hand-in-hand with exuberance". When Wright died, Nils Schweizer completed the design. As finished in 1964, the Marjorie McKinley Music Building spans 7,000 square feet (650 m^{2}) and has several classrooms and 16 private rehearsal rooms; it incorporates part of an older structure on Johnson Street.

A Usonian house, originally designed during Wright's lifetime, was built in 2013 as part of the Sharp Family Tourism and Education Center. The center has a gift shop and gives tours. The house spans 1,700 square feet (160 m^{2}). Its facade is made of nearly 2,000 textile blocks with embedded glass cubes. Inside are two bedrooms, where furnishings and replicas of furniture by Wright are displayed. The house also has a portrait by Yousuf Karsh and a statue by Don Haugen and Teena Stern, both depicting Wright. Similar to Wright's other designs, the house has design features such as concrete floors, Florida cypress, a carport, and cantilevered spaces.

Some of Wright's designs were never completed in any form. These included sculptures of a freshman student and a graduate, which Wright commissioned from Carl Milles in 1938. An early conception for the Music Building in 1943 included a 400-seat "Little Theatre", patterned after his previous, also-unbuilt New and Hartford theaters. Another unbuilt design was an arts building honoring Gertrude Vanderbilt Whitney, designed in 1944. The Whitney building would have included a pair of two-story studio–residences, a group of student studios, and an art museum, all linked by an esplanade. Jutting into Lake Hollingsworth would have been a 80-by-176-foot (24 by 54 m) swimming pool surrounded by a 5,000-seat amphitheater, which was partly built before being canceled in 1953.

=== Adjacent structures ===
Seven earlier buildings on the West Campus were designed in the neo-Georgian style, with red-brick facades. These are remnants of an earlier, incomplete master plan for the campus designed by Frederick H. Trimble. The neo-Georgian buildings include Edge Hall and Joseph–Reynolds Hall (1922); the men's dormitory (1925; later demolished); and Allan Spivey Hall, Gilbert Gymnasium, the Student Activities Building, and the President's Residence (1936–1937). A relocated Hindu temple originally from Varanasi (Benares), made of Indian sandstone and topped by a spire, was built in 1938.

Also adjoining Child of the Sun are four buildings designed by Robert A. M. Stern. Stern's designs include two Y-shaped residence halls, which has Wright-style deep overhanging roofs, along with the Christoverson Humanities Building, which has Wright-inspired red columns and a double-height atrium. The West Campus also has six Wright-inspired shelters for feral cats, measuring about 3 feet (0.91 m) wide and 5 feet (1.5 m) tall. Other neighboring structures include the Jenkins Field House, next to the Ordway Building.

==== Schweizer buildings ====
After Wright's death, Schweizer designed several West Campus buildings. The Branscomb Memorial Auditorium (completed 1964), an 1,800-seat venue measuring 140 by 220 feet (43 by 67 m) across, with a 40-by-40-foot (12 by 12 m) stage and movable orchestra pit. The auditorium also included a green room, conference rooms, lounges, lobbies, and three classrooms. The roof and walls are supported by ten large concrete beams, and there is a 78-foot-tall (24 m) stage loft, along with a concrete wall facing Lake Hollingsworth. A glass pavilion adjoins Branscomb Auditorium.

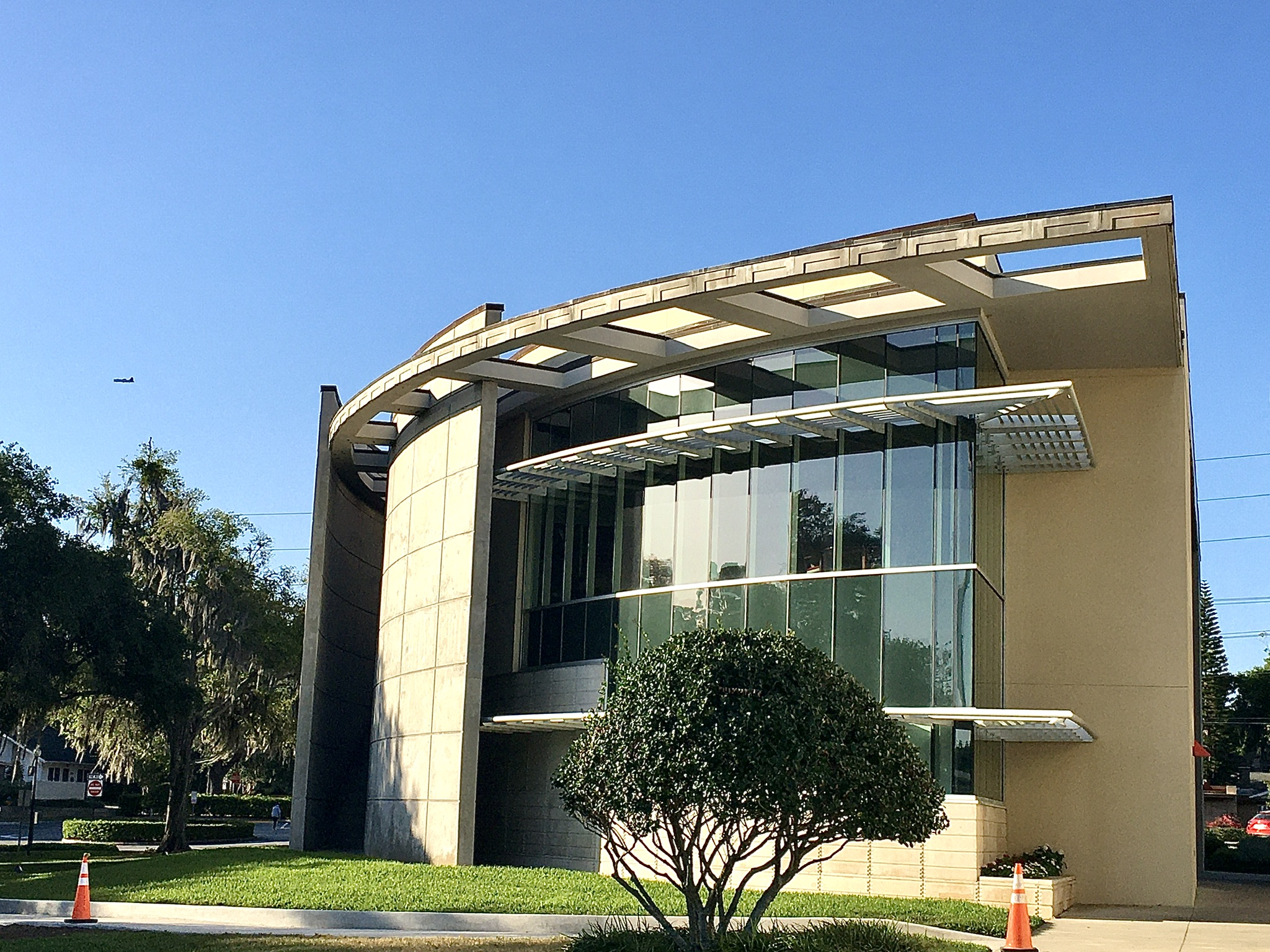
The McKay Archives Center in 2021

The current Roux Library (1968) is a three-story structure just north of the Water Dome. It has a concrete facade, clerestory windows, skylights, and concrete-and-mahogany finishes. Adjoining it is the McKay Archives Center (2009), designed by Straughn Trout Architects.

The Spivey Humanities and Fine Arts Center (1971) is located at the West Campus's southwestern corner and is constructed of similar materials to the auditorium. The fine arts building has a thrust stage–style auditorium with 367 seats, in addition to about 34,000 square feet (3,200 m^{2}) of arts space across three stories. The William F. Chatlos Journalism Building (1980) includes three interconnected structures. The Carlisle Rogers Building (1984) is two stories high, with a curved glazed-block wall on one side and a concrete wall on the other.

== History ==
=== Background ===
The earliest buildings in the 1920s and 1930s were part of a Neo-Georgian campus designed by Frederick H. Trimble.

Florida Southern College (FSC), a private United Methodist Church-affiliated college, began offering college-level courses in 1886 as the Florida Conference College. Known by 1906 as Southern College, the institution originally occupied a campus in Leesburg, which burned down in 1921. This prompted the college's relocation to Lakeland. The Lakeland tract originally measured 30 acres (12 ha), 62 acres (25 ha) or 78 acres (32 ha). Florida architect Frederick H. Trimble designed a new neo-Georgian campus in Lakeland, envisioning a central building flanked by quads with dormitories. The first two buildings were constructed in 1922 on the eastern part of the campus.

Ludd M. Spivey took over as Southern College's president in 1925. He attempted to raise $1 million to complete the campus, (Note: Equivalent to $14,211,000 in 2024) but the collapse of the Florida real estate bubble and then the Great Depression slowed the college's development for over a decade. During Spivey's first twelve years, five additional buildings were constructed to Trimble's design. The men's dormitory was finished in 1926 and, at $25,000, (Note: Equivalent to $355,000 in 2024) was the only building constructed from Spivey's campaign. Southern College was renamed FSC after becoming accredited in 1935. Shortly afterward, a lecture hall, gymnasium, the Student Activities Building, and the President's Residence were completed. A Hindu temple was also relocated from India and dedicated in 1938.

=== Wright commission and design ===
Further expansion to the campus came about after Spivey became acquainted with theologician E. Stanley Jones during a trip to Europe in 1936; following this meeting, they formed the E. Stanley Jones Educational Foundation the next year. Jones wanted to develop several buildings on the campus, including an administration building shaped like a cross. To fund the new buildings, the Jones Educational Foundation launched a $1 million fundraising campaign and solicited donations from across the US, (Note: Equivalent to $17,428,000 in 2024) raising $350,000 of that amount from Floridians. (Note: Equivalent to $6,100,000 in 2024) The foundation prompted Spivey to consider completing the architectural campus, though sources disagree on his motivation for using a new style. Sources variously cited the death of Spivey's son Allan, or Spivey's visits to a war monument in Copenhagen or a Protestant memorial in Geneva, as inspirations for Spivey's turn toward modern architecture.

Spivey eventually determined on hiring Frank Lloyd Wright to design the rest of FSC's campus. There is little documentation on how Spivey first heard about Wright; former FSC business manager Corning Tolle claims that three faculty members suggested Wright's name to Spivey. One story has it that Spivey initially confused Wright with the novelist Harold Bell Wright. In any case, in April 1938, Spivey invited Wright to build an "education temple" for FSC. Though Methodists raised no objection to Wright's selection, Wright did not take the commission until he visited the campus. Wright visited nearby Tampa for a banquet that May, during which he toured FSC's Lakeland plot. After the visit, Wright accepted the commission; he was, at the time, experiencing financial troubles. Also in May, Spivey convinced philanthropist Annie M. Pfeiffer to donate $50,000 for a proposed chapel at FSC, which was named after her. (Note: Equivalent to $871,000 in 2024) FSC lacked funding for the other buildings, in part because of a poor 1938 citrus-growing season, but Spivey promised Wright that he would "work night and day" in fundraising.

Wright charged a 10% architectural fee for each building, plus $13,000 for the site plan, (Note: Equivalent to $227,000 in 2024) which he spent the next several months devising. Early reports speculated that Wright would a single building for the Jones Foundation. His initial design called for buildings on an orthogonal (perpendicular) grid arranged around two primary north–south axes. These primary axes would have flanked a water fountain to the north and a lake to the south. He then revised the design to arrange all the buildings on intersecting grids, creating a site plan of 30-60-90 triangles. Wright's site plan was unveiled in September 1938. His proposal called for covered walkways connecting multiple standalone buildings surrounded by tree groves. There were to be an administration building, theater, amphitheater, chapel, and library, along with educational halls. FSC wanted the chapel constructed first, as the campus sorely lacked an assembly space, forcing assemblies to be held outside or within a temporary space at Spivey Hall. As such, Wright drew up detailed plans for the chapel.

=== Construction ===
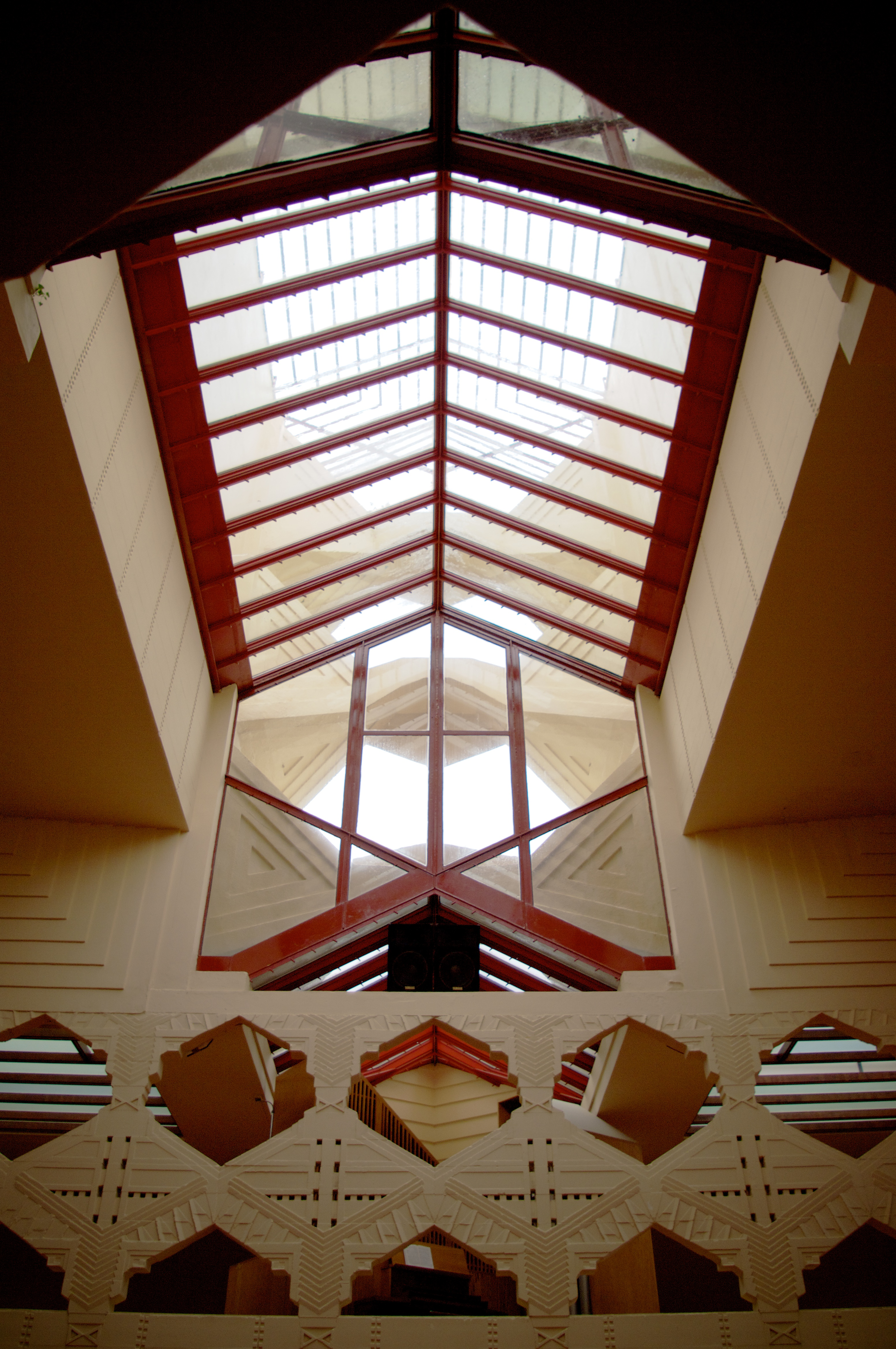
Pfeiffer Chapel (interior pictured) was among the first buildings on campus to be built.

Spivey and Wright became close associates, despite both men's frequent disputes. During construction, Wright frequently requested money from Spivey, and Spivey often requested updated plans from Wright; both men delayed fulfillment of their respective requests. Wright initially wanted to complete all the buildings in three years, but FSC's lack of funding prolonged the timeline significantly. Spivey advised his associate and eventual successor, Charles T. Thrift Jr., to make partial payments to Wright, hoping that the architect would forget about outstanding debts. Wright's associate William Wesley Peters, who was involved with the early phases of construction, claimed that Spivey mandated that contractors seek his approval for "every smallest purchase". Wright also got into disputes with contractors and FSC donors, and he unsuccessfully demanded the demolition of the existing campus.

Students constructed the first five buildings, alternately laboring and attending classes in exchange for having some tuition dues waived. Students experimented with the coquina–sand ratio of the cement in the textile blocks, a process that took eight months to perfect. The cement was poured into wooden molds to create patterns, then left to harden for several weeks. The students used varying coquina–sand ratios, leading to inconsistencies in material quality. Wright also aged the copper using students' urine. (Note: Sources disagree on how the urine was supplied. The Architects' Journal wrote that Wright had collected urine from students, while the Corpus Christi Times wrote that Wright encouraged students to urinate on the copper directly.) The college's student newspaper, the Southern, often published articles requesting student labor. FSC's decision to use student labor arose from its status as a private college, but sources disagree on whether the college itself was ineligible for public funding, or whether the students could not qualify for government-funded scholarships. Wright disliked the use of student labor, which he claimed resulted in structural defects.

==== First buildings ====
Construction of Pfeiffer Chapel commenced in mid-November 1938, and Jones laid its cornerstone on November 26. By that December, the Jones Foundation had made $500,000 available for the buildings' construction. (Note: Equivalent to $8,714,000 in 2024) After Spivey distanced himself from the Jones Foundation in 1939, work on the chapel continued. Much to Spivey's displeasure, the chapel walls had still not been completed by early 1940. Amid the delays, Spivey asked Wright to prepare plans for 20 Usonian-style houses and two dormitories. Wright also prepared plans for three seminar buildings and the Industrial Arts Building in mid-1940, and groundbreaking for the first seminar building took place that September. Pfeiffer Chapel was nearly complete, hosting its first service that month. Work on the first seminar building was delayed for several months while students focused on completing the chapel. Students began pouring foundations for the seminar building that December; that building reused some of the tiles that had been rejected during the chapel's construction.

Pfeiffer Chapel formally opened in early 1941 and cost $100,000. (Note: Equivalent to $1,640,000 in 2024) Work on the two other seminar buildings began that March, and a section of covered esplanade was built between the seminar buildings and the chapel. By then, FSC's existing library was inadequate, prompting Spivey to commission a new library from Wright. The architect drew up the library plans that year, and work on the foundations was underway by August; the new facility was originally named for FSC treasurer E. T. Roux. All three seminar buildings were finished by late 1941, having cost $80,000. (Note: Equivalent to $1,312,000 in 2024) They were dedicated the following March and were initially used as administrative offices. The seminar buildings were named for dormitory matron Isabel Walbridge, linguistics professor Charles W. Hawkins, and schoolteacher Cora Carter. Also in March 1942, the organ at Pfeiffer Chapel was dedicated, and a groundbreaking ceremony was hosted for the partially-complete Roux Library. The chapel, along with the Hindu temple, attracted visitors from across the country.

==== Mid- and late 1940s ====
The Industrial Arts Building (exterior courtyard pictured), one of the designs drawn up in 1942 and remained unbuilt for years

The onset of World War II and funding shortfalls resulted in significant delays, and many male students went to fight in the war, causing labor shortages. Among the delayed projects were the Industrial Arts Building, for which plans were finished in 1942. These plans remained unbuilt for several years, during which a cafeteria in the original plan was dropped. The science building, commissioned the same year, was similarly delayed. The library's completion was also interrupted by the war, and restrictions on steel led to the substitution of wood and concrete. FSC began teaching construction techniques to its female students so construction of the library could proceed. Spivey reduced teachers' salaries and took out loans to pay Wright's architectural fee.

Wright began preparing plans in 1943 for a music building—to be funded by Eleanor Searle Whitney, an alumna who had funded FSC's music school—and a theater. These plans were abandoned, partly because of disputes between Whitney and Wright. He also drew plans for an art building and sculptures, neither of which were carried out. By 1944, FSC was preparing to build its next structure, a fountain called the Water Dome. That year, the walls of the Pfeiffer Chapel partially collapsed during the 1944 Cuba–Florida hurricane and were rebuilt, albeit with slight modifications. The Roux Library was completed by March 1945, and work on the Water Dome began that year. In December 1946, FSC hosted groundbreaking ceremonies for its administration buildings, which were budgeted at $125,000. (Note: Equivalent to $1,529,000 in 2024) The administration buildings were the campus's first Wright-designed structures to not be built using student labor, but their construction was also delayed, owing to material shortages.

An unidentified donor provided funds for a second chapel in 1947, though no progress on these plans was made for several years. By then, Spivey was planning five additional Wright-designed facilities, including a swimming pool–amphitheater complex on Lake Hollingsworth, on which work had commenced. The Water Dome and additional esplanades were being completed, as were dormitories and other structures on the other side of campus. The Water Dome was finished in 1948 for $15,000. (Note: Equivalent to $156,000 in 2024) The two administration buildings were dedicated that June; one was named for actuary Emile E. Watson, and the other was named for New York Times education editor Benjamin Fine. Work on the administration buildings continued through October and ultimately cost $200,000. (Note: Equivalent to $2,081,000 in 2024) Wright had finished his plans for the Industrial Arts Building by 1949, at which point it was to contain lecture halls and an amphitheater. Whitney tried to revive the proposed music building in the late 1940s, but she never ended up funding any buildings on campus, and Wright's swimming pool–amphitheater also stalled.

==== 1950s ====
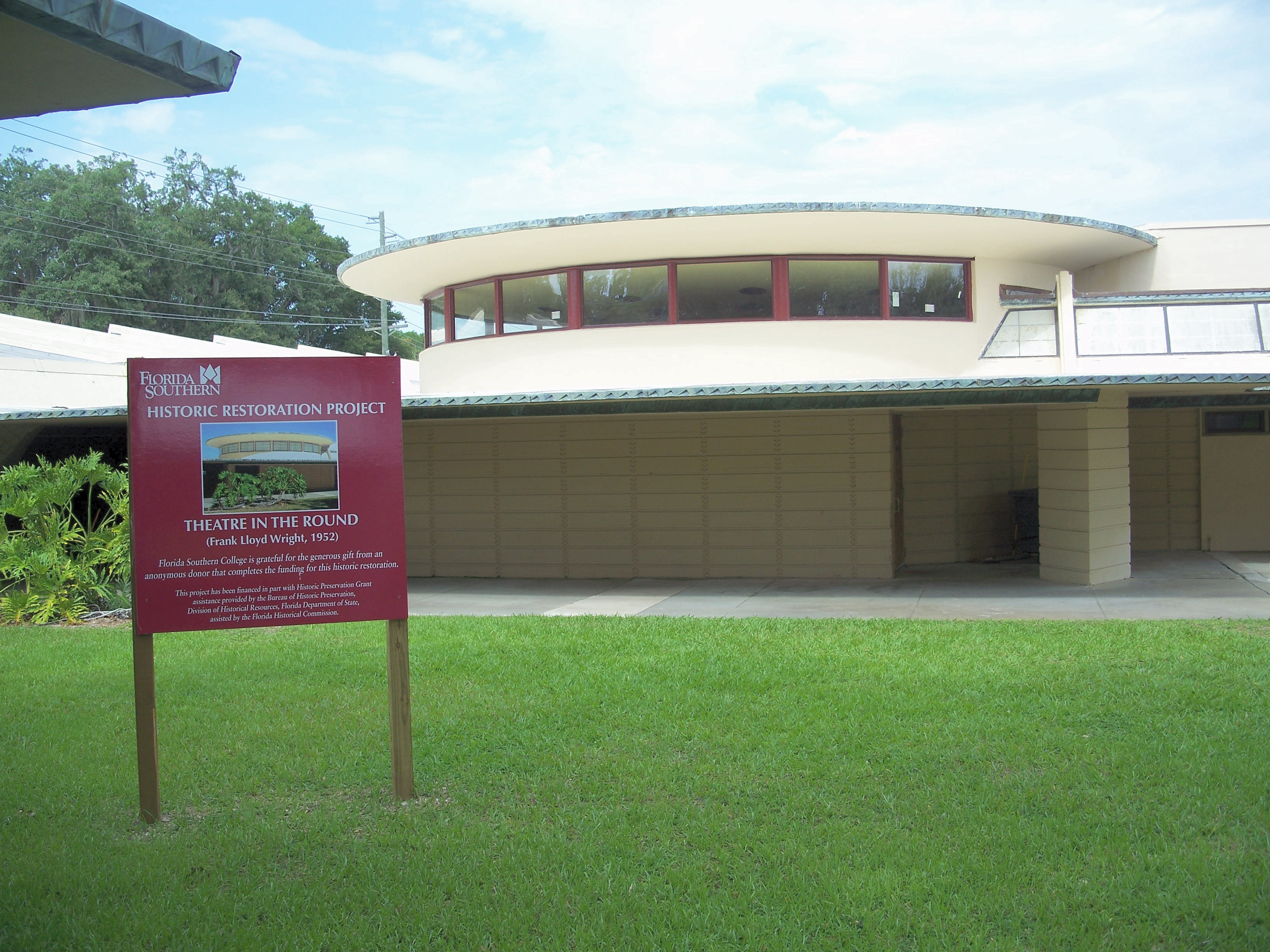
The Industrial Arts Building (pictured) was completed in 1952 and was originally named for businessman J. William Horsey.

Because of Wright's designs, tourists often visited the West Campus by the early 1950s, and FSC's enrollment increased. Work on the Industrial Arts Building commenced with a groundbreaking ceremony in March 1950. Spivey told FSC's trustees that Canadian businessman J. William Horsey had agreed to fund the project, though no such promise had been made; FSC ended up funding the Industrial Arts Building on its own. In October 1950, Spivey began raising money from Polk County residents for the Science Building, hoping to begin construction within two years. The college sought to raise $350,000 for the Science Building, (Note: Equivalent to $3,609,000 in 2024) of which about $175,000 (Note: Equivalent to $1,690,000 in 2024) had been raised by April 1951. The Industrial Arts Building was ready for occupancy by later that year and was dedicated in March 1952. It cost over $1 million (Note: Equivalent to $9,456,000 in 2024) and was originally named for Horsey. That month, a groundbreaking ceremony was hosted for the Polk County Science Building, for which $225,000 had been raised. (Note: Equivalent to $2,128,000 in 2024) Work on the Science Building was delayed while Wright finished his plans. By that year, Spivey believed the campus could be completed by 1957.

The swimming pool–amphitheater had been canceled by 1953, after fruitless attempts to restart construction, and a conventional facility was built elsewhere on campus. Meanwhile, businessman William H. Danforth provided funding for a second chapel, which began construction in May 1954. Danforth Chapel was dedicated ten months later, in March 1955. That year, Wright associate Nils Schweizer expanded the Fine Building and enclosed an outdoor balcony on the Watson Building to provide more space for administrative offices. A proposal to enclose the esplanade between the Fine and Watson buildings was not carried out. Hilla von Rebay, director of the Solomon R. Guggenheim Museum in New York, offered the same year to fund an arts building, which never materialized. The Polk County Science Building's east wing was first occupied in late 1955 and formally opened in February 1956. The Industrial Arts Building was renamed that March for businessman Lucius Pond Ordway Jr., son of Lucius Pond Ordway, who funded part of the building's cost following Horsey's refusal. By later that year, two other portions of the Science Building were complete.

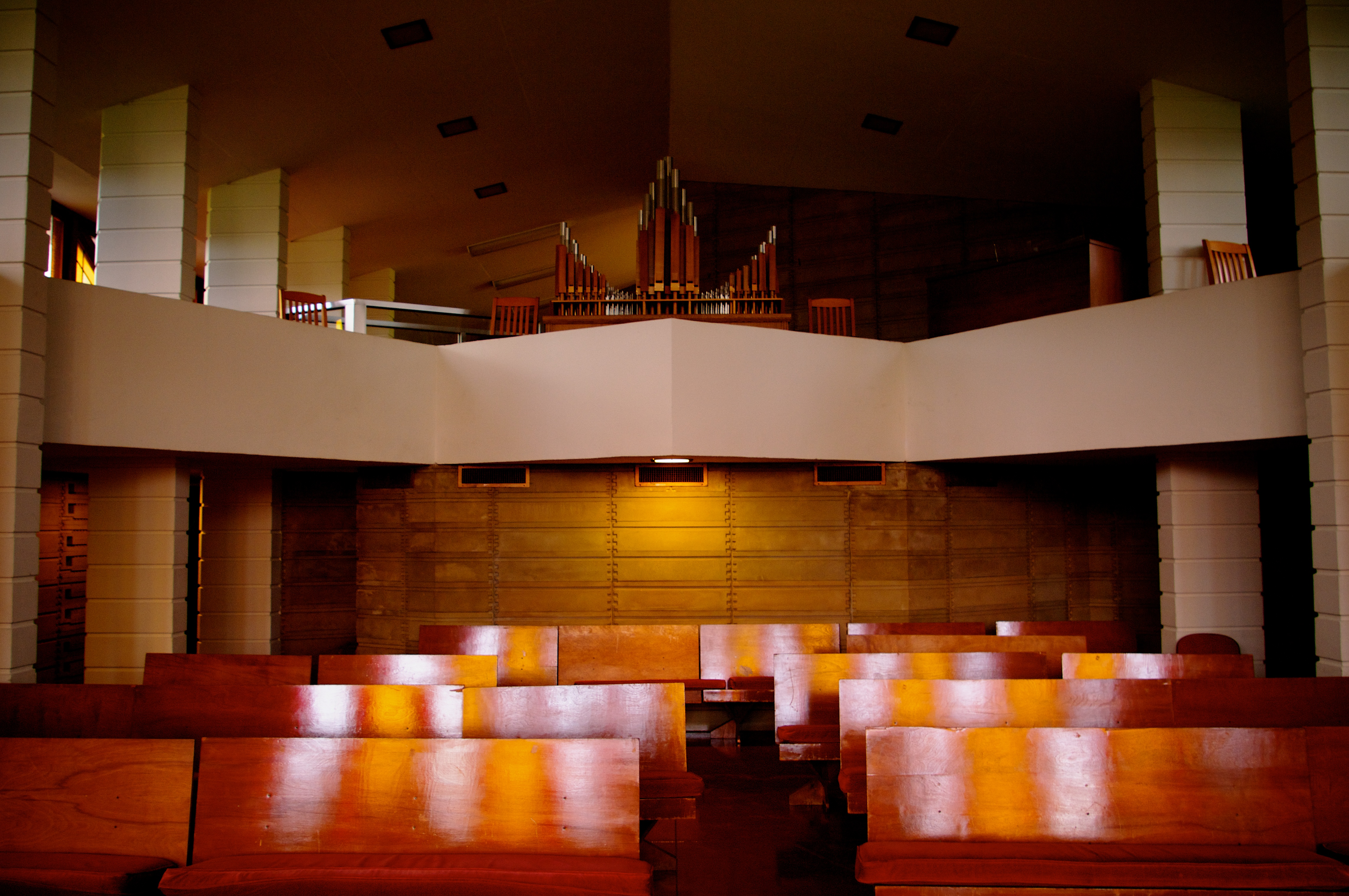
Danforth Chapel was completed in 1955.

By 1957, the year of Wright's last visit to the campus, ten of his structures had been built; this count included the Water Dome but not the esplanades. FSC, which had a record-high enrollment of over 2,000 students, was planning additional buildings throughout its campus. Wright had prepared a third set of plans for the Music Building, groundbreaking for which occurred in March 1957. Immediately afterward, Spivey retired as FSC's president. That April, FSC began raising $275,000 to fund completion of the Science Building, (Note: Equivalent to $2,341,000 in 2024) whose cost had jumped to $1.1 million. (Note: Equivalent to $9,364,000 in 2024) Work on the Science Building's planetarium continued into early 1958, and the Science Building was completed that year. By then, further construction had been deferred by Spivey's retirement, and expansion of the esplanades ceased. The three seminar buildings were also combined into the Raulerson Building.

=== Late 20th century ===
Wright died in 1959, just after completing plans for an auditorium. Work on the Music Building continued. Despite initial expectations that Spivey's successor Charles Thrift would carry out Wright's other unbuilt FSC designs, this did not happen. FSC's relationship with Taliesin Associated Architects (TAA), the successor firm to Wright's practice, declined in part because FSC owed TAA substantial debts. The West Campus continued to attract tourists, and Wright's buildings continued to attract students to FSC, even as other Florida universities saw decreased admission.

==== Additional expansions and modifications ====
Meanwhile, after the Methodist Conference implored FSC to build a meeting space, plans for an auditorium were announced in June 1962, The facility was named in honor of Methodist Conference bishop John Branscomb and was originally budgeted at $500,000, (Note: Equivalent to $3,958,000 in 2024) though the conference subsequently raised another $250,000 to pay for classrooms there. (Note: Equivalent to $1,979,000 in 2024) FSC asked multiple firms to submit designs for the auditoriums, including TAA, which refused to submit designs unless awarded the commission in advance, and was removed from consideration. FSC instead hired Schweizer, who went on to design several buildings for the West Campus. Groundbreaking for the auditorium took place that November.

To honor Spivey, sculptor Boris Blai donated a bust of Wright to the West Campus in 1962. The next year, FSC also announced that the auditorium and Music Building would be incorporate into the new Fine Arts Center, which Spivey had wanted to develop before his retirement. The incomplete Branscomb Auditorium opened in January 1964 and was dedicated that March. Concurrently, the Music Building was also dedicated in honor or Marjorie McKinley, who along with her husband Kent S. McKinley had funded its construction. Because the old Roux Library was poorly suited for use as a library, FSC received a federal loan in 1966 to construct a new library. The new Roux Library began construction in November 1966; also designed by Schweizer, it was opened by March 1968. The old library subsequently became the Buckner Building, with offices and exhibit space. The Water Dome was also reconfigured due to maintenance issues.

The Fine Arts Center was constructed in several sections in the 1960s.

Work on a third building by Schweizer, the Fine Arts Center's performing and visual arts wing, began in late 1968 and was completed in 1971. In 1975, the Buckner Building's reading room was renamed to honor Publix executive William M. Hollis. By the late 1970s, Schweizer was designing the Communications Center for FSC's journalism department, replacing an existing house. Plans for the journalism building were announced in November 1978, and the building, named for developer William F. Chatlos, opened in 1980. FSC trustee J. Carlisle Rogers donated additional funds in 1983 for an economics building, which opened the next year.

==== Deterioration, 1980s and 1990s repairs ====
During the late 20th century, the hot and humid climate caused the rebar to rust, and the flat roofs collected water and leaked. Due to water damage, the plasterwork was crumbling, and copper trim was falling off. The textile blocks were crumbling, though the blocks made by commercial companies after World War II fared even worse than those made by students. Termite infestations caused woodwork to rot, and people took pieces of the buildings as souvenirs. Repairs and expansions were inconsistent with the original design. For instance, air conditioners and utility ducts were added, carpets were placed over the floors, wood trim was replaced with metal, and the interiors were altered to various degrees. The landscape had also been altered significantly with the removal of greenery and trees.

Amid this deterioration, FSC sought to restore the buildings' original designs. The college began raising funds in 1985, seeking to collect $15 million for the project. (Note: Equivalent to $37,037,000 in 2024) The renovations coincided with the growth of Florida's tourism industry; by then, the campus had many tour buses. Though there were no formal campus tours at the time, FSC allowed self-guided tours. A $2 million, (Note: Equivalent to $4,231,000 in 2024) six-year renovation of the campus was underway by 1990. The first completed projects were a renovation of the chapel, funded by alumni, along with a restoration of the Buckner Building's reading room, funded by a $200,000 grant. (Note: Equivalent to $423,000 in 2024) The college also received $300,000 from the Kresge Foundation to help fund the repairs. (Note: Equivalent to $635,000 in 2024) A visitor center opened within the renovated Buckner Building in 1992, after which guided tours began. By later that decade, the campus had 20,000 annual visitors.

John McAslan & Partners was hired in 1993 to prepare a master renovation plan, and McAslan and local firm Lunz & Associates were subsequently hired to prepare proposals for both new buildings and restoration of Wright's structures. The master plan identified the Science Building as urgently needing repairs, though FSC was reluctant to demolish it. Deterioration of the campus continued due to budgetary shortfalls and a lack of interest from FSC's donors, though FSC allocated funds to repair Danforth Chapel's roof and requested grants for other buildings. As part of a project spanning several buildings, Pfeiffer Chapel's ironwork was restored in 1998. The same year, work began on the Science Building, partly funded by a $270,000 state preservation grant. The Science Building renovation was completed in 2001 and involved repairing the facade, rearranging and expanding the interiors, and upgrading mechanical systems.

=== 21st century ===
The planetarium closed in 2004 after its projector stopped working. After Anne Kerr became FSC's president that year, she raised funds for additional renovations. In 2006, the Florida Legislature allocated $350,000 for the Water Dome's restoration, and a private donor provided matching funds. The state also allocated $1.6 million for the esplanades' renovation and $350,000 for the Pfeiffer Chapel, and FSC received a $195,000 Getty Foundation grant for a master plan. Plans were also underway for additional buildings elsewhere on campus. The Water Dome's basin was excavated in 2006, and the Water Dome was activated in October 2007. By that year, the World Monuments Fund had added Wright's West Campus to its list of 100 most endangered sites, citing the buildings' deteriorating condition. The cost of the campus's ongoing renovation had increased to $50 million.

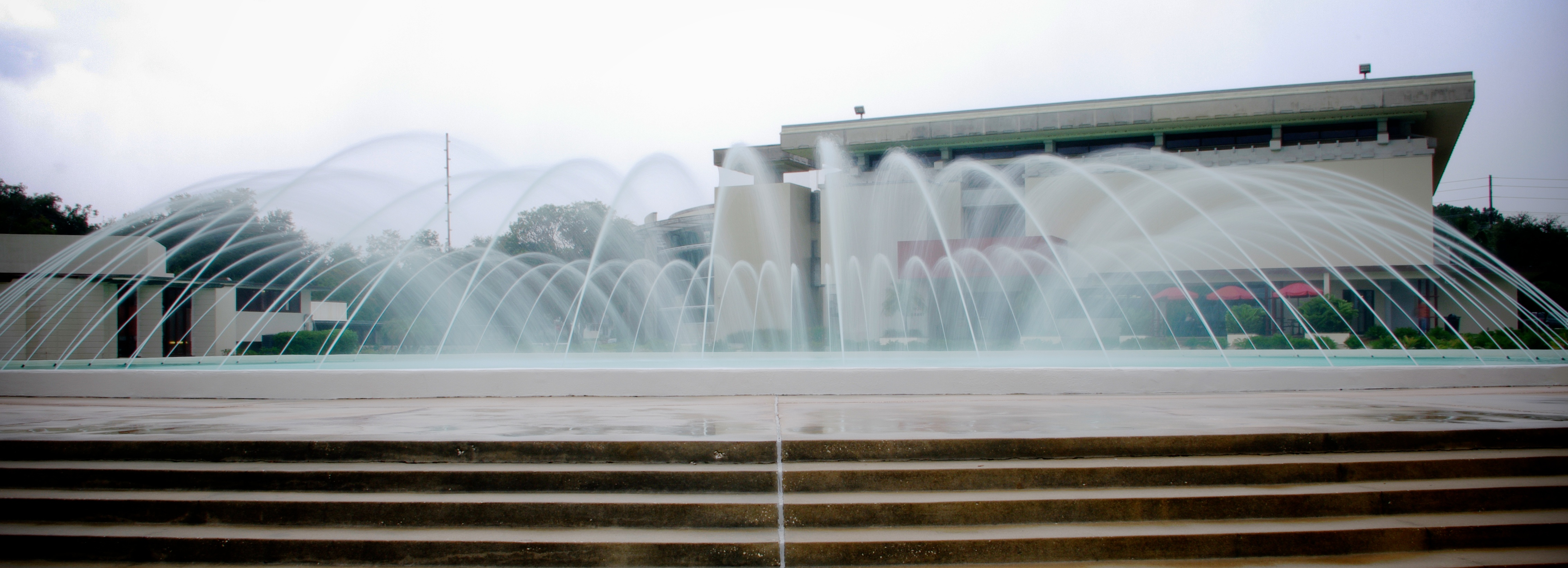
Water Dome with fountains on

The campus attracted 25,000 annual visitors by the late 2000s, during which FSC hired architect Jeff Baker to create the master plan. A plaza at the Ordway Building was redesigned in 2008, and the McKay Archives Center, an annex to the second Roux Library, opened the next year. Baker revised one of Wright's original unbuilt designs, a Usonian house, to accommodate the Sharp Family Tourism and Education Center, plans for which were announced in 2011. The house, the campus's first new Wright design in a half-century, opened in November 2013. The same year, FSC built Wright-inspired dormitories for the campus's feral cats, and Lakeland commissioners renamed McDonald Street, at the campus's northern end, after Wright. When the Pfeiffer Chapel underwent restoration in 2014–2015, replica textile blocks were 3D printed. Elsewhere on campus, Baker designed a admission building in a Wright-inspired style, which opened in 2017.

The National Park Service provided funds in 2021 for a renovation of Science Building's planetarium. FSC hired MCWB Architects in 2024 to renovate the Ordway Building for its newly-established architecture program. The same year, Pfeiffer Chapel flooded and leaked, prompting FSC to sue to contractor who had overseen the 2010s renovation of the chapel's roof. FSC settled the Pfeiffer Chapel lawsuit in 2026 and began repairing the chapel's roof that year. The planetarium reopened that September following a $1.7 million renovation, which included audiovisual upgrades, repainting, restoration of original finishes, and removal of a computer closet.

== Impact and legacy ==
=== Reception ===
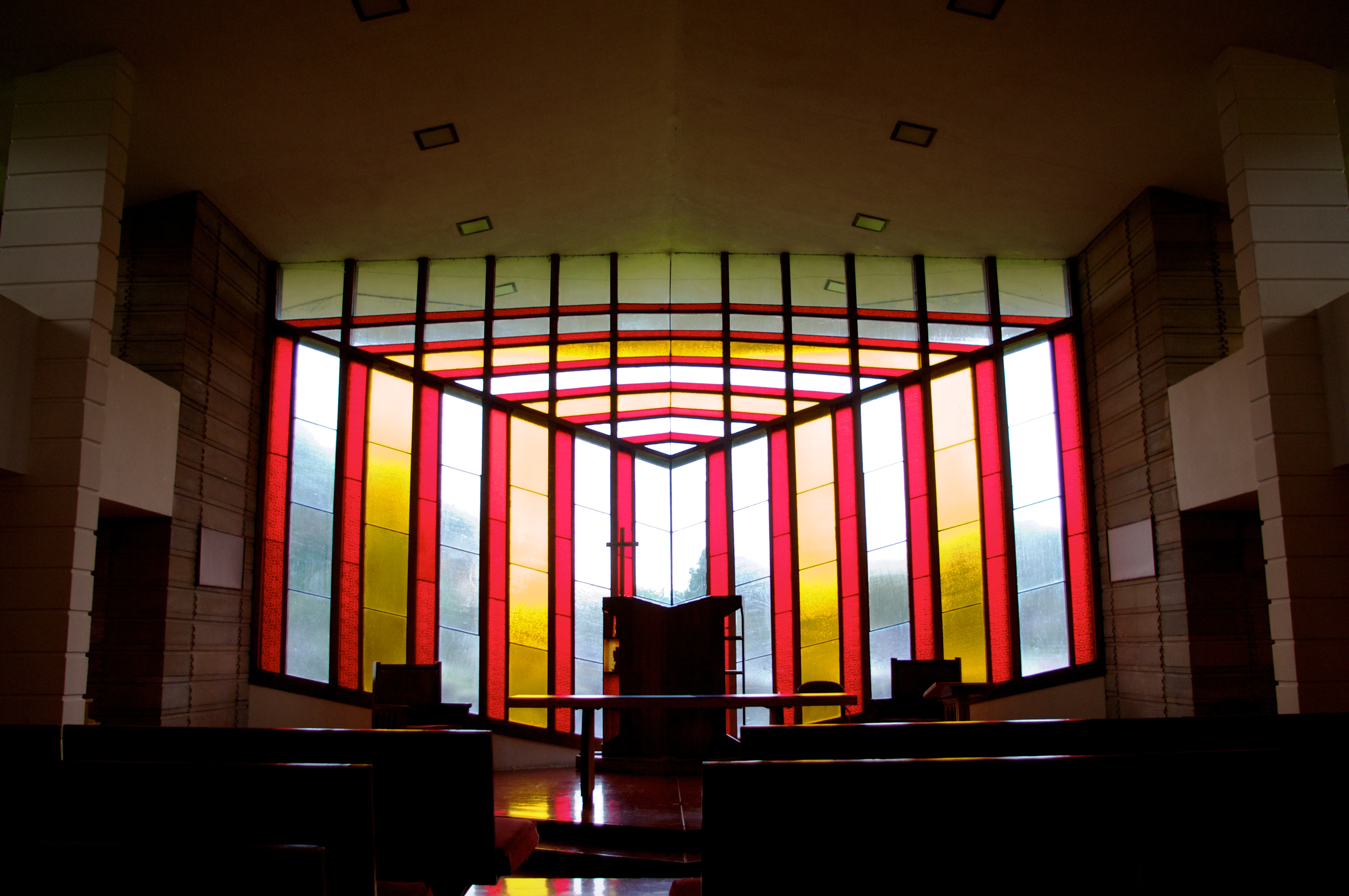
Interior of Danforth Chapel

Wright's FSC buildings were not as widely publicized as other Wright projects such as the Johnson Wax Headquarters and the Guggenheim Museum, but the West Campus's development was still covered in the architectural media. Architectural Forum, which published four articles about the project, said the campus would give the US "at least one example of the cultural value of organic building well suited to time, purpose and place". The Chicago Daily Tribune called the West Campus the most architecturally unconventional in the US, and The Christian Science Monitor said the campus appeared "as though it had been pulled from a movie set" because of the contrast between Wright's buildings and older structures. FSC historian Dale Allen Gyure called Child of the Sun "the first collection of American college buildings designed in a modernist mode". Spivey was reportedly pleased with the design, though opinions among students and staff were divided.

After Wright's death, The New York Times wrote that the setting was "almost as spectacular as the architecture", and Dorothy Minorca of the Chicago Daily Tribune called the campus a "monument" to Wright. The Miami Herald said FSC had "perhaps the state's most unusual campus", and the Tallahassee Democrat wrote that the campus had "a striking contrast of modernistic architecture and older conventional buildings". The Toronto Star wrote in 1966 that the campus had "a sweep, a daring, a feeling for terrain and surroundings" that later designs lacked. During the 1970s, Vogue magazine called the buildings "as glorious a set of buildings as you have ever seen", and The Baltimore Sun wrote that Wright's designs, despite their structural shortfalls, were shelter-like rather than overwhelming. The Washington Post called the complex "the closest Wright ever came to realizing a master plan for a city of the future" in 1987. Conversely, Wright biographer Meryle Secrest said the FSC designs generally lacked the "ethereal" quality of Wright's other works.

By the 1990s, the Pittsburgh Post-Gazette and Orlando Sentinel described Child of the Sun as one of Wright's lesser-known commissions. Several Wright biographers had given the campus passing mentions or failed to mention it completely. During that decade, The Philadelphia Inquirer said the exotic interiors contrasted with the stark exterior designs, and The Washington Post said the campus had raised FSC's stature. In the 21st century, the Madison Capital Times wrote in 2008 that the "strong and inventive geometric lines" gave the campus an artistic feel, and Domus magazine said the staggered construction timelines had created a "layered, complex character". In part because of Wright's buildings, Architectural Digest ranked the FSC campus as having some of the US's best collegiate architecture in 2011, and The Princeton Review ranked it as the US's "most beautiful campus" in 2012,.

==== Specific buildings ====
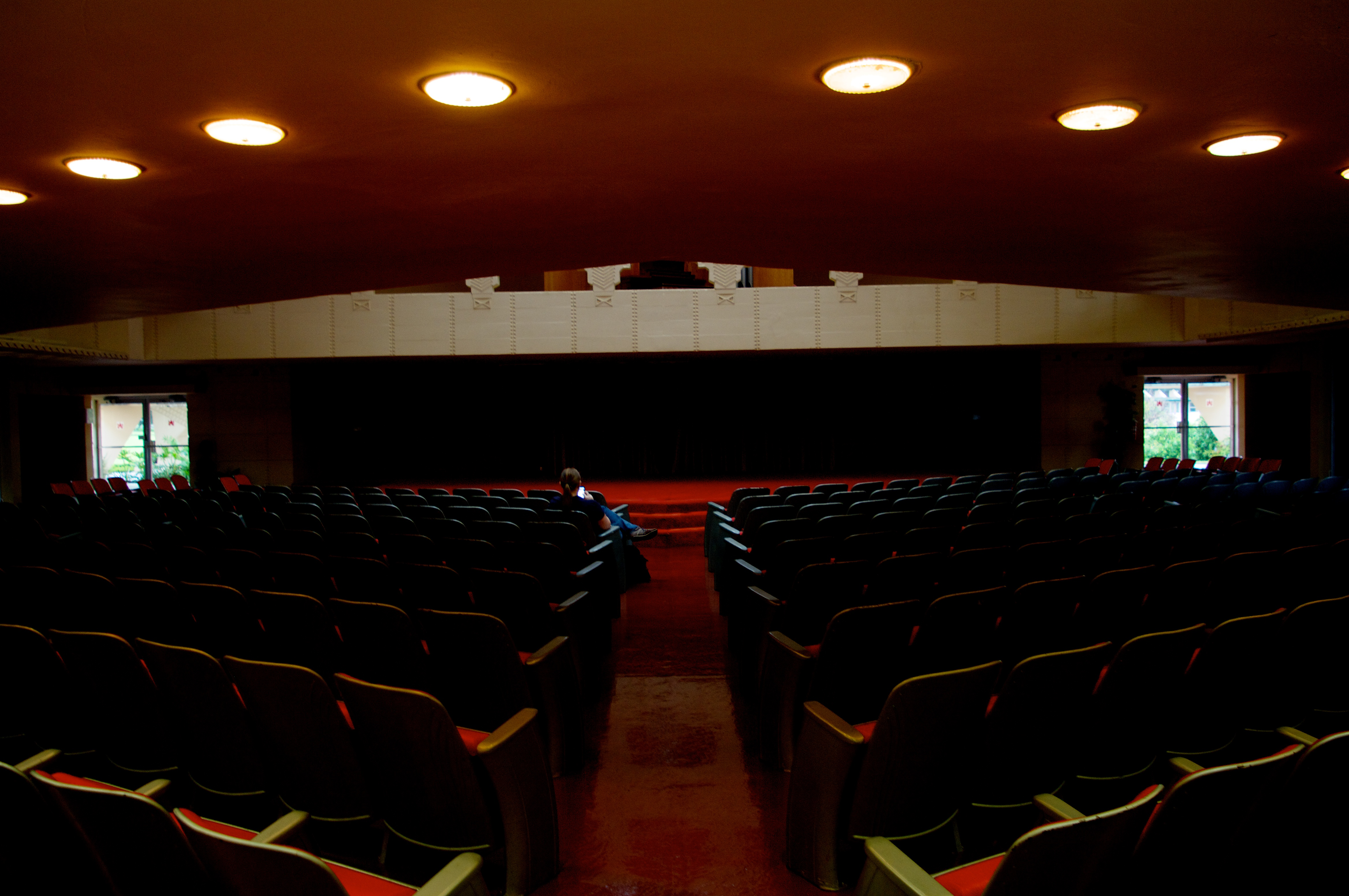
Both Domus magazine and historian Dale Allen Gyure perceived Pfeiffer Chapel (interior pictured) as a particularly striking building on the campus.

Secrest regarded Pfeiffer Chapel as one of Wright's most successful designs, despite describing it as having an "almost comically spaceship look". Both Domus magazine and Gyure perceived Pfeiffer Chapel as a particularly striking building on the campus. The Globe and Mail wrote that the tower's spire seemingly floated and that the interiors had "dazzling bursts of color", a feeling the Inquirer said the chapel retained "even on a gray day". The Chicago Tribune wrote that Pfeiffer Chapel encapsulated all the major elements of Wright's architectural philosophy. Conversely, critics compared Pfeiffer Chapel to a fortress and deplored its overly-large capacity and lack of an altar. Wright said of the design's skeptics: "Who is the authority to say what a chapel should look like?"

Minorca wrote that the Buckner Building was "a daringly imaginative circular library" and that the Ordway Building was "one of the most striking and ambitious of Wright's units on the campus". While Minorca regarded the Science Building as "magnificent", Gyure said it was "somewhat formal and straightforward". The Globe and Mail and the Montreal Gazette both regarded the Danforth Chapel as jewel-like, and the Inquirer described the esplanades as "simple yet elegant". The later Schweizer buildings received mixed commentary; the News-Press said Schweizer continued Wright's design philosophy "admirably", while Gyure said the Schweizer designs did not maintain the small scale of Wright's buildings.

=== Media and landmark designations ===
FSC's logo is variously cited as depicting Pfeiffer Chapel's silhouette or a warning symbol Wright designed after bumping into a window. Wright photographer Pedro E. Guerrero took pictures of the first buildings after World War II; his photographs were depicted in an exhibition hosted at New York's Museum of Modern Art in 1947. The campus was also depicted in exhibits at Barnsdall Art Park (1954), the San Diego Museum of Art (1990), and the Guggenheim Museum (2008). One of the textile block molds was displayed at the Bass Museum in 1984. The Wright buildings are also the subject of a 2024 PBS documentary, and the McKay Archives Center contains a collection of documents relating to the West Campus's development.

Wright's buildings were originally added to the National Register of Historic Places (NRHP) in 1975 as the Florida Southern College Architectural District. This district includes seven contributing properties, corresponding to the twelve completed designs. A historical marker commemorating this designation was installed in 1977. In March 2012, the Florida Southern College campus was re-added to the NRHP as a National Historic Landmark District, a more selective designation granted to particularly noteworthy structures.

== See also ==
- List of Frank Lloyd Wright works
- List of National Historic Landmarks in Florida
- National Register of Historic Places listings in Polk County, Florida
