= Ringling College of Art and Design =

Art school in Sarasota, Florida

Coordinates: 27°21′38″N 82°32′53″W

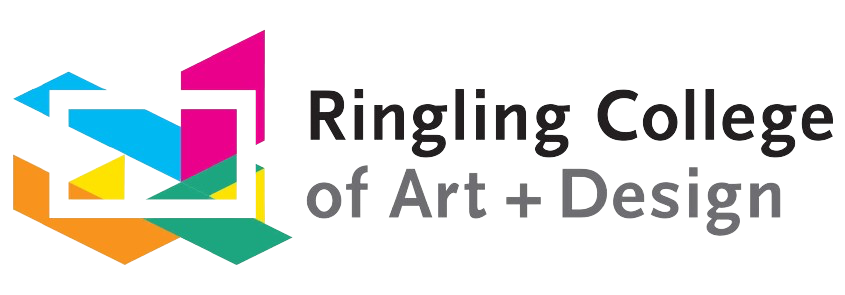
- Other name: RCAD
- Former names: The School of Fine and Applied Art of the John and Mable Ringling Art Museum, Ringling School of Art and Design (RSAD)
- Type: Private art school
- Established: March 31, 1931; 95 years ago
- Founder: Ludd M. Spivey
- Accreditation: Southern Association of Colleges and Schools
- Academic affiliations: National Association of Schools of Art and Design
- Endowment: $75.65 million (2025)
- President: Davis Schneiderman
- Students: 1,663
- Location: Sarasota, Florida, United States
- Campus: Urban 48 acres (19 ha)
- Mascot: Remy the Armadillo
- Website: www.ringling.edu
- Location of RCAD Ringling College of Art and Design (the United States)

Ringling College of Art and Design (RCAD; stylized as Ringling College of Art + Design) is a private art and design school in Sarasota, Florida. It was founded by Ludd M. Spivey as an art school in 1931 as a remote branch of Southern College before their separation in 1933.

== History ==
The origins of the college go back to when the President of Southern College (now called Florida Southern College), Ludd M. Spivey, wanted to get the support of John Ringling for his institution. Spivey learned that Ringling did not have an interest in helping Southern College, was almost broke, and wanted to start his own art school on the grounds of his museum. The two discussed the idea of creating a new and independent art school before reaching the agreement that they would open a school in Sarasota as a branch of Florida Southern College.

The School of Fine and Applied Art of the John and Mable Ringling Art Museum was founded on March 31, 1931. It opened on October 2 with 75 registered students. The school, although an extension of Florida Southern, initially functioned as a junior college with business and arts classes. The college would end up breaking off from Southern College in 1933 after Ringling faculty discovered and disliked that money made from the school went to pay salaries at the college's Lakeland campus. Another theory holds that conservative Methodist trustees from Florida Southern were outraged that Ringling students were drawing naked models, so they sought to end the relationship. In any case, the school ended up successfully petitioning for and officially became independent on May 14, 1933, when they received their charter. Under this new charter, the institution became known as the Ringling School of Art. In 1934, the junior college and music courses were eliminated and the decision was made to concentrate solely on art. After World War II, enrollment grew at the school, growing from 250 in 1949 to 450 by 1959, with help from the G.I. Bill.

The institution qualified for full accreditation as a degree-granting institution by the Southern Association of Colleges and Schools in 1979. That year the college became known as the Ringling School of Art and Design. In 1984, the school became accredited by the National Association of Schools of Art.

The campus has in the past also included the Longboat Key Center for the Arts, which operated from 1952 to 2017.

Most recently, the Sarasota Art Museum, housed in a newly renovated 1926 Sarasota High School, opened in 2019 as a division of Ringling College of Art and Design, and comprises a separate "Museum Campus" further south than main campus.

== Academics ==
The college currently offers the Bachelor of Fine Arts and Bachelor of Arts degrees. It operates on a semester academic term system.

=== Library ===
The Alfred R. Goldstein Library is an informational, educational, and social hub for RCAD's students and faculty. Designed specifically for its creative students, the library's collection includes children's literature, game arts, graphic novels, letterpress, book arts, pop up books, special collections, reference, and online resources. The 46,000-square-foot library houses over 75,000 books and periodicals.

The Ringling College Library Association (RCLA) is a nonprofit organization that was created by a small group of community leaders in 1975 in an attempt to aid Ringing College in constructing its first library. The RCLA operates with an annual overhead of 10% and has “made gifts and commitments to the college in excess of $11 million”. With nearly 2,000 members, the RCLA continues to support the Alfred R. Goldstein Library and the RCAD community by providing scholarships to students, programming special events (including the RCLA Town Hall Lecture Series), and encouraging creativity and community togetherness.

The library hosts an independent art publishing book fair called Paper Jam. Organized jointly with Letterpress and Book Arts Center and the Brizdle-Schoenberg Special Collections Center and in collaboration with SRQ Zine Fest, the annual event features a wide array of creative books and experimental printed items that highlight local and diverse perspectives.

The library originated as a first floor location on the east side of campus. Its new modern facility, completed in January 2017, is centrally located, physically representing the mission of the library as the heart of its college. The $20 million library, designed by Shepley Bulfinch and Sweet Sparkman Architects, is significantly larger than its predecessor. It features furnishings selected by RCAD students, bright colors, a 24-hour lab, a café, ten group study areas, and 4 terraces overlooking Whitaker Bayou. American Libraries, a publication of the American Library Association, featured the Alfred R. Goldstein Library in its yearly Library Design Showcase later in 2017.

Alfred Goldstein, the library's namesake, was a local benefactor. Along with his wife Ann, he contributed to many Sarasota organizations and funded the Ann Goldstein Children's Rainforest Garden at the Marie Selby Botanical Gardens. The library naming ceremony took place on February 15, 2016.

== Notable alumni ==
The Ringling Alumni Wall of Honor on the main campus recognizes RCAD alumni who have received awards and accolades since graduating, and whose creative work has made a positive impact. Twelve alumni are honored each year, one for each major, as well as alumni leaders who support the college with their time and generosity.

Distinguished alumni include the following individuals:

- David Bromstad — designer, television personality
- Jeff Fowler — filmmaker and animator
- John Hambrock — graphic designer, cartoonist of The Brilliant Mind of Edison Lee
- Bret Iwan — voice actor, illustrator
- Tim Jaeger — painter
- Andrew Jones — concept artist and digital "painter"
- John Marshall — cartoonist of the Blondie comic strip
- Brandon Oldenburg — Academy Award-winning short film director and illustrator
- Patrick Osborne — Academy Award-winning short film director and animator
- Tim Rogerson — painter
- Michelle Phan (never graduated) — make-up demonstrator and entrepreneur - founder of EM cosmetics
- Nick Pitera — singer-songwriter, musician, animator
- Mike Zeck — comic book artist
- Brenna Thummler — illustrator, author of Sheets graphic novel
