= Tim Jaeger =

American artist

Tim Jaeger (born August 6, 1979) is an American artist. He currently lives and works in Sarasota, Florida.

== Early life and education ==
Jaeger was born in Kalamazoo, Michigan as the 4th of 5 children to an Episcopal priest. At a young age Jaeger moved to Paducah, Kentucky. In 1998, Jaeger, relocated to Sarasota, Florida to earn his bachelors of arts from the Ringling College of Art and Design.

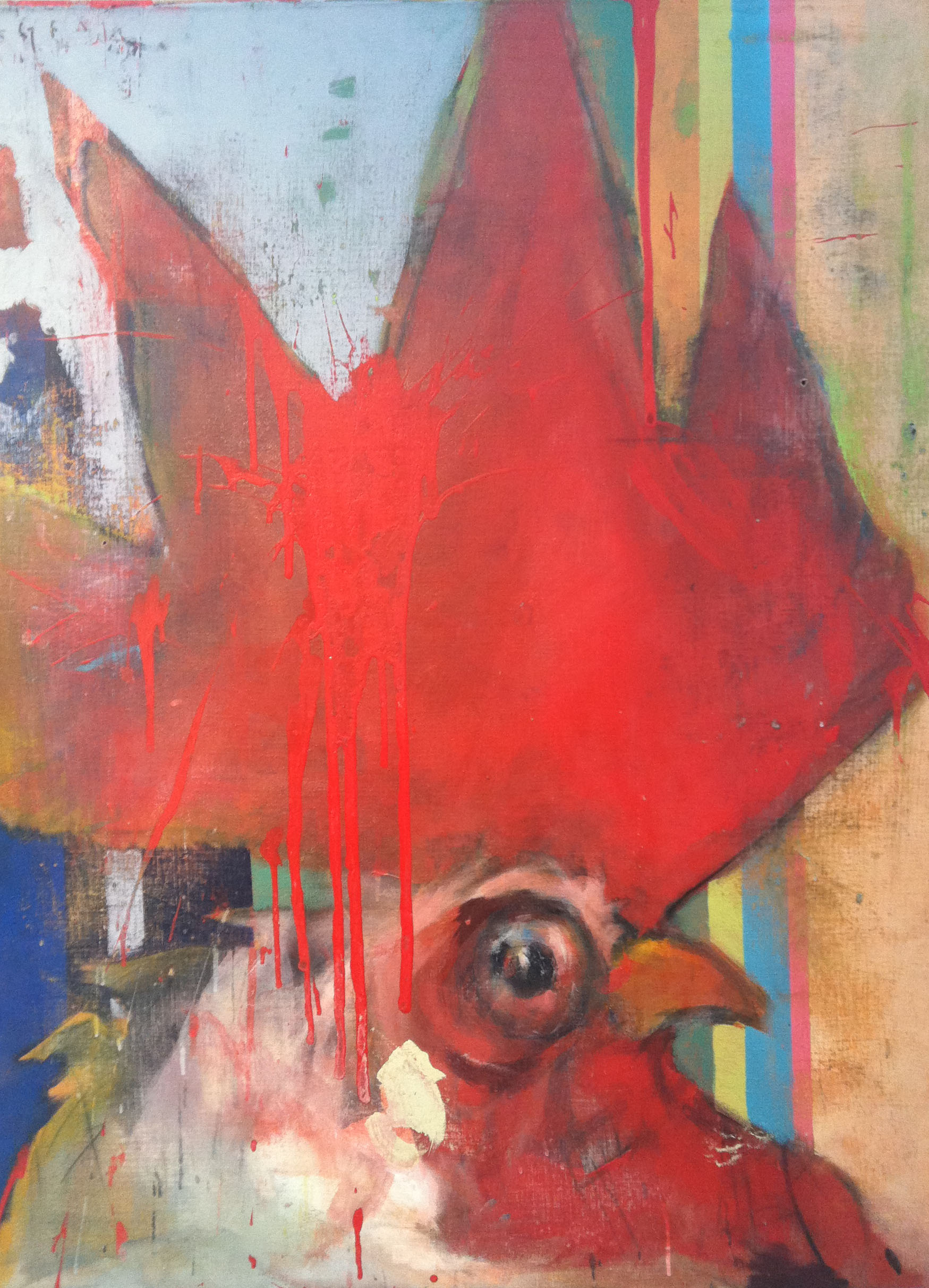
From the Rooster Series: Tim Jaeger, CS no. 14, 36" x 48", acrylic and oil on canvas, 2015

== Rooster series ==
Jaeger began the "CS" series of rooster during an artist residency in Moncaret, France in 2008. The large-scale painting employs a palette of bright fire-engine reds and cools pastels for added impact. “Until a couple years ago, I worked solely with the human figure, and throughout that time, found myself becoming more interested in the paint and what I could do with the color, application, and process, rather than the subject itself. The subject of my works became impressions, the mundane imprint of the human shape, rather than real expressions of humanity. As I searched for a new subject matter, I found myself increasingly and inexplicably painting roosters.”

== Selected exhibitions, awards, and projects ==
- Art in Bloom, Paducah School of Design and Art, Paducah, KY, 2016
- Curator, Kevin Dean: Extra Ordinary, Alfstad Contemporary, Sarasota, FL, 2015
- Curator, All in the Family, Icehouse Artspace, Sarasota, FL, 2013
- SELECT ART FAIR, Art Basel Miami, Miami, FL, 2012
- Artist that Made Sarasota Famous Invitational, Sarasota Art Center, Sarasota, FL, 2012
- Florence Biennale, group exhibition, Florence Italy, 2009
- Prospect One Biennale Exhibition, group exhibition, New Orleans LA, 2008
- Chateau L’ Hespiret, solo exhibition, Montcaret France, 2008, 2009
- Founder, SARTQ artist cooperative, 2008
