= Tim Rogerson =

American painter

Tim Rogerson is an American painter of Disney Fine Art who was an official artist of the 2006 Winter Olympic Games in Turin, Italy.

== Biography ==
Born in Kissimmee, Florida, Rogerson grew up very close to Walt Disney World, where his father worked as Show Director (the position responsible for managing and maintaining all live performances in the park) until the family moved to North Carolina.

He later moved back to Florida and attended the Ringling School of Art and Design in Sarasota, where he majored in illustration. When asked about his time at art school, Rogerson says:

"I was a very traditional art student and explored all works; from the old masters to modern art. My influences include Degas and John Singer Sargent...their work has allowed me to push the envelope with my own abstraction of life."

While studying at Ringling, Rogerson was awarded the 2003 Best Painter Award and in 2003 and 2004, he was awarded the Best of Ringling Award.

Rogerson's latest honor was awarded to him by the 2006 Winter Olympic Committee when they made him one of only a handful of Official Olympic Artists. When asked about the painting, "US Olympic Winter Team 2006," he says,

"I wanted my painting for the Olympics to be an ode to the men and women who are competing; from the graceful glide of the ice skater to the speed of the bobsled to the determination of the downhill skier."

Rogerson now dedicates most of his time to creating works of Disney Fine Art. His pieces blend his unique style with iconic Disney characters.

== Style ==
At the heart of Rogerson's style is his compulsion to reinvent it:

"My work will always evolve, becoming more complex and detailed...I want my paintings to celebrate life and stay fresh...I try to stay away from the basic routine and technique because my joy for painting comes from the challenge of creating something entirely new."
