= Lewis House (Tallahassee, Florida) =

Historic house in Florida, United States

- U.S. National Register of Historic Places
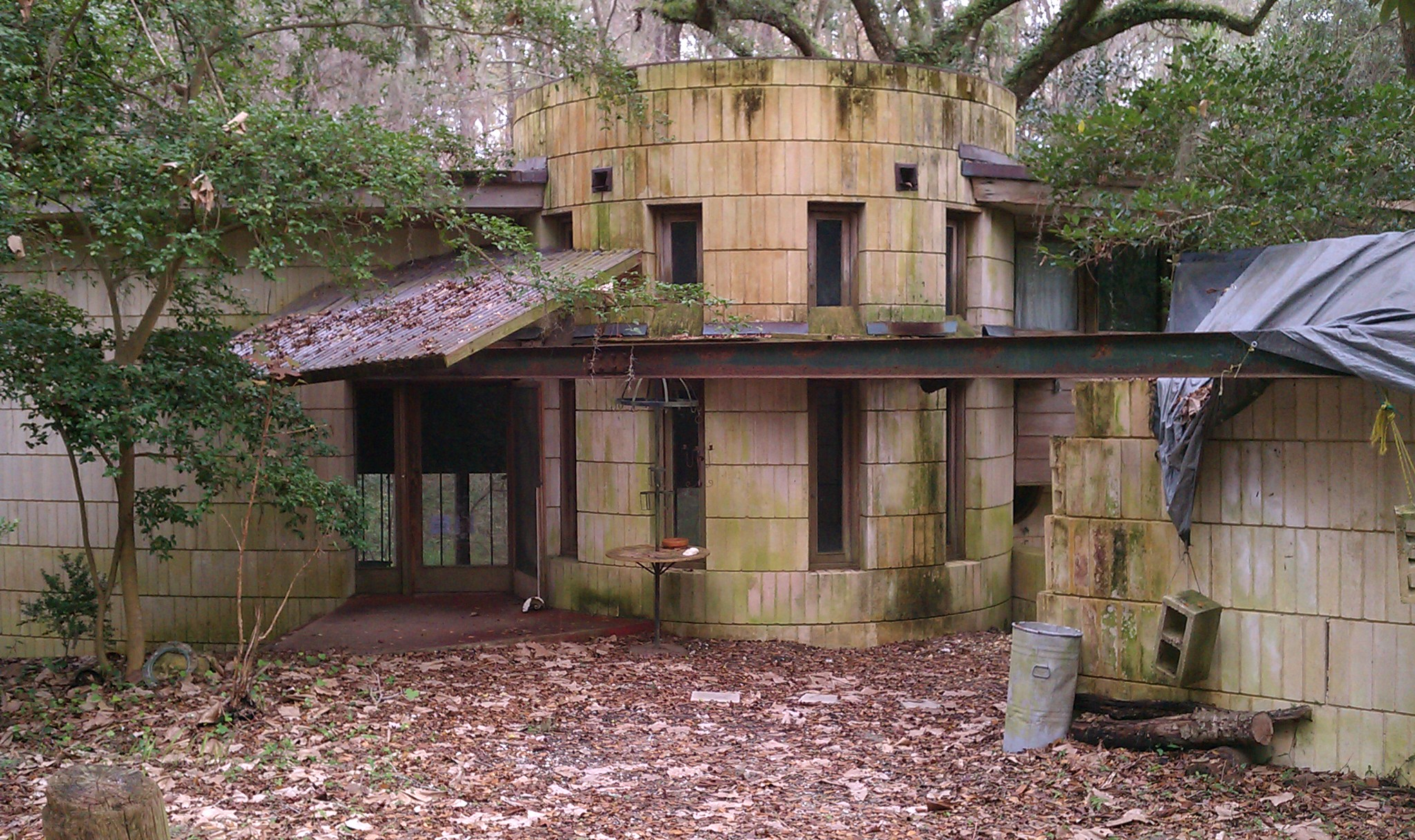
- Interactive map of Lewis House
- Location: Leon County, Florida
- Nearest city: Tallahassee
- Coordinates: 30.4901°N 84.3127°W
- Built: 1954
- Architect: Frank Lloyd Wright
- Architectural style: Modern Movement
- NRHP reference No.: 79000679
- Added to NRHP: February 14, 1979

The Lewis House, also known as Lewis Spring House, is a historic home at 3117 Okeeheepkee Road in Tallahassee, Florida, United States. Built in 1954, it is one of a small number of hemicycles designed by the architect Frank Lloyd Wright during his lifetime. The two-story house is made mainly of red tidewater cypress, limestone, concrete, and glass from the surrounding area. The house has two curved facades on the west and east, creating an American football–shaped floor plan; a mechanical tower protrudes from the western facade. Inside, the first floor contains an open plan living–dining room and a kitchen. A second floor, with three bedrooms and two bathrooms, partially overhangs the first floor. The house is listed on the National Register of Historic Places.

The house was built for the family of the bank executive George Lewis II and his wife, the community activist Clifton Lewis. The family first asked Wright to design them a house in either 1948 or 1950; after the family obtained a 10-acre (4.0 ha) site, Wright drew up plans, which were completed in 1952. The house was constructed between April and December 1954, though some furniture and parts of the terrace were never completed. The Lewis family lived in the house until 2010, and the house fell into disrepair over the years. The Spring House Institute was formed to preserve the house in 1996, but it did not begin raising money for repairs until 2013. The house was placed for sale in 2025.

== Description ==
The Lewis Spring House is located at 3117 Okeeheepkee Road, near Tallahassee, Florida, United States, just north of the interchange between U.S. Route 27 and Interstate 10. The house occupies a 10-acre (4.0 ha) site on a tree-lined hill. The site originally abutted a stream and a natural spring, which had dried up by the 2000s. When the house was built, there were wild berries and dogwood, pecan, and palm trees surrounding the house. Because the house is concealed behind trees, passersby and residents often do not know about its existence.

The Lewis Spring House is one of the few hemicycle houses that the architect Frank Lloyd Wright designed; sources disagree on whether he designed "fewer than 10" or 11 hemicycles. It is Wright's only extant house in Florida and is variously cited as the only residential design he ever designed there, or one of two such houses aside from the now-demolished Villa Zila in Palm Beach. It is also one of Wright's few Florida designs; his only other structures in the state are on the Child of the Sun campus at Florida Southern College. The design inspired those of several houses designed by Wright's associate Nils Schweizer, the project's construction supervisor, in central Florida. According to Florida A&M University architecture dean Andrew Chin, the design "shows the evolution of Frank Lloyd Wright's style in his legendary practice". The house has been likened to a ship or sailboat because of its shape, which might be a reference to the original owners, the Lewis family's, appreciation of water.

=== Exterior ===
The house's floor plan is arranged on a grid of overlapping and concentric circles. The floor plan resembles an American football in shape, bounded by one circular arc each to the east and west. This design was adapted from Wright's earlier Robert Llewellyn Wright House, which the architect had designed in Maryland for one of his sons. The house extends approximately 71 feet (22 m) long from north to south. Near the western end of the house, a circular utility tower (containing the kitchen, bathrooms, and mechanical ducts and pipes) protrudes from the facade. This contrasted with Wright's other designs, where the mechanical core tended to be centrally positioned. A circular grass terrace extends to the north of the house; the original plans called for a wall and a swimming pool within the terrace, but these features were ultimately excluded. A wall extends southwest to a detached storage room, creating a carport that runs along the northwest of the wall.

Red tidewater cypress, limestone, concrete, and glass are the primary materials used in the building. These materials generally came from the surrounding area, as Wright preferred to use locally sourced materials in his designs. Similarly to Wright's other designs, the Spring House's design emphasizes the facade's horizontal design details, and numerous materials are juxtaposed in unconventional ways to create decorative detail.

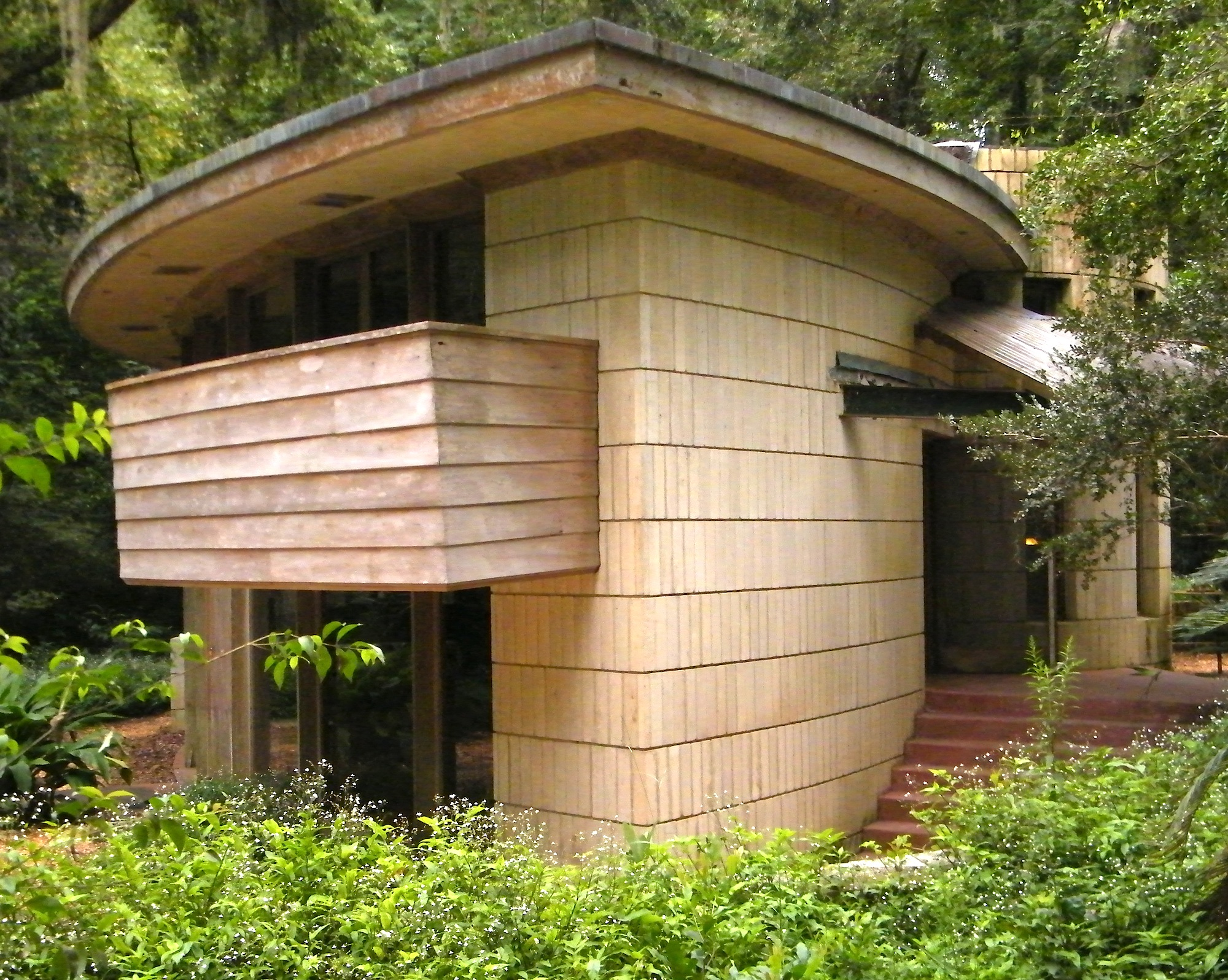
The north end of the house. The concrete-block facade is visible at right, while the wooden balcony protrudes from the facade at left.

The main entrance is on the west, abutting the northern wall of the utility tower, and consists of a glass-and-wood door. On the facade's western elevation, there are small, inverted round arched windows at the top of the first story. The lower section of the house is clad in beige-tinted Ocala concrete block, a common construction material used in Florida in the mid-20th century. Concrete blocks are also used for the utility tower's entire facade. The blocks are oriented vertically to more closely approximate the curve of the wall, and all of the concrete blocks have horizontal joints for visual emphasis.

The upper section is clad in wood, which came from cypress trees that grew in the area. On the second floor, a wooden balcony is cantilevered slightly outward from the facade, and a horizontal strip of clerestory windows runs below the roofline. The flat roof has wood-framed eaves that also protrude from the facade; it is supported by rafters and steel beams under it. The eastern elevation of the house has wood-framed floor-to-ceiling glass windows, which face the garden. The top of the glass wall has transom windows, which are extensions of the clerestory windows on the western elevation, and the second-story balcony protrudes into the glass wall at the south and north ends of the house.

=== Interior ===
The house is variously cited as covering 1,500 square feet (139 m^{2}), 2,040 square feet (190 m^{2}), 2,282 square feet (212 m^{2}), or 2,300 square feet (214 m^{2}). The main entrance leads to a staircase landing, with stairs leading up to the second floor and down to the first floor. The staircase continues down into a circular basement with storage closets and a boiler. The foundation of the house is composed of deep pilings, which support a poured-concrete floor slab that is tinted red. The original plans had not entailed adding pilings under the floor slab, but Schweizer added the pilings after finding that the underlying ground was made of porous, unstable pipe clay. Wright designed custom furniture for the house; although many of these pieces were not built, a Wright–designed table was built for the house in 2022. The house also has two end tables, which were designed by another architect. When the Lewises lived there, they decorated the spaces with family photos.

The first floor, spanning the house's entire football-shaped footprint, includes a curved, open plan main room that functions as a combined living–dining area. The only interruption is the kitchen, which is in the utility tower and is enclosed by circular walls. The eastern portion of the main room, facing the garden, is a double-height space. Part of the main room is located beneath the second-floor balcony; underneath it is a built-in bench that runs along the western wall, facing the garden to the east. The ceiling under the balcony is only 6 feet (1.8 m) high because Wright, who was 5 ft 8 in (1.73 m) tall, designed the house based on the assumption that the average person was his height. The fireplace has a cylindrical brick mantel, and the fireplace grates are attached to the concrete floor slab. There are also a built-in dining table and a fireplace hood. In addition, wood-and-glass double doors lead out to the garden, and the main room's floors are made of yellow pinewood.

The second story is suspended from the roof, with concentric walls curving east toward the garden. It contains two bathrooms and three bedrooms; these spaces, as well as the exterior balconies at either end, are all accessed by a narrow passageway. Both bathrooms are within the utility core and are illuminated by a skylight. South of the utility tower are the master bedroom, a small second bedroom, and a large third bedroom respectively. The master bedroom has a fireplace with a circular hood, while the third bedroom leads directly to the balcony. The bedrooms' decorative schemes are largely derived from the contrasts between characteristics (such as textiles and colors) of different construction materials. The ceiling of each bedroom is covered in plaster, with square wood-and-frosted-glass lamps recessed into the ceiling. The hardware, such as the door and window hinges, are made of brass.

== History ==
The house was designed for the family of George Lewis II, the president of the Lewis State Bank, and his wife Clifton Lewis, a community activist. The Lewises had married when Clifton was 20 years old, and they had four children within eight years. Clifton had been interested in Wright's architecture since 1940, when she had read a Better Homes and Gardens magazine article titled "A House Can Have A Soul", which had described Wright's work on another hemicycle-style home. The family was a supporter of avant-garde art. displaying contemporary artwork in the Lewis State Bank's gallery.

=== Development ===
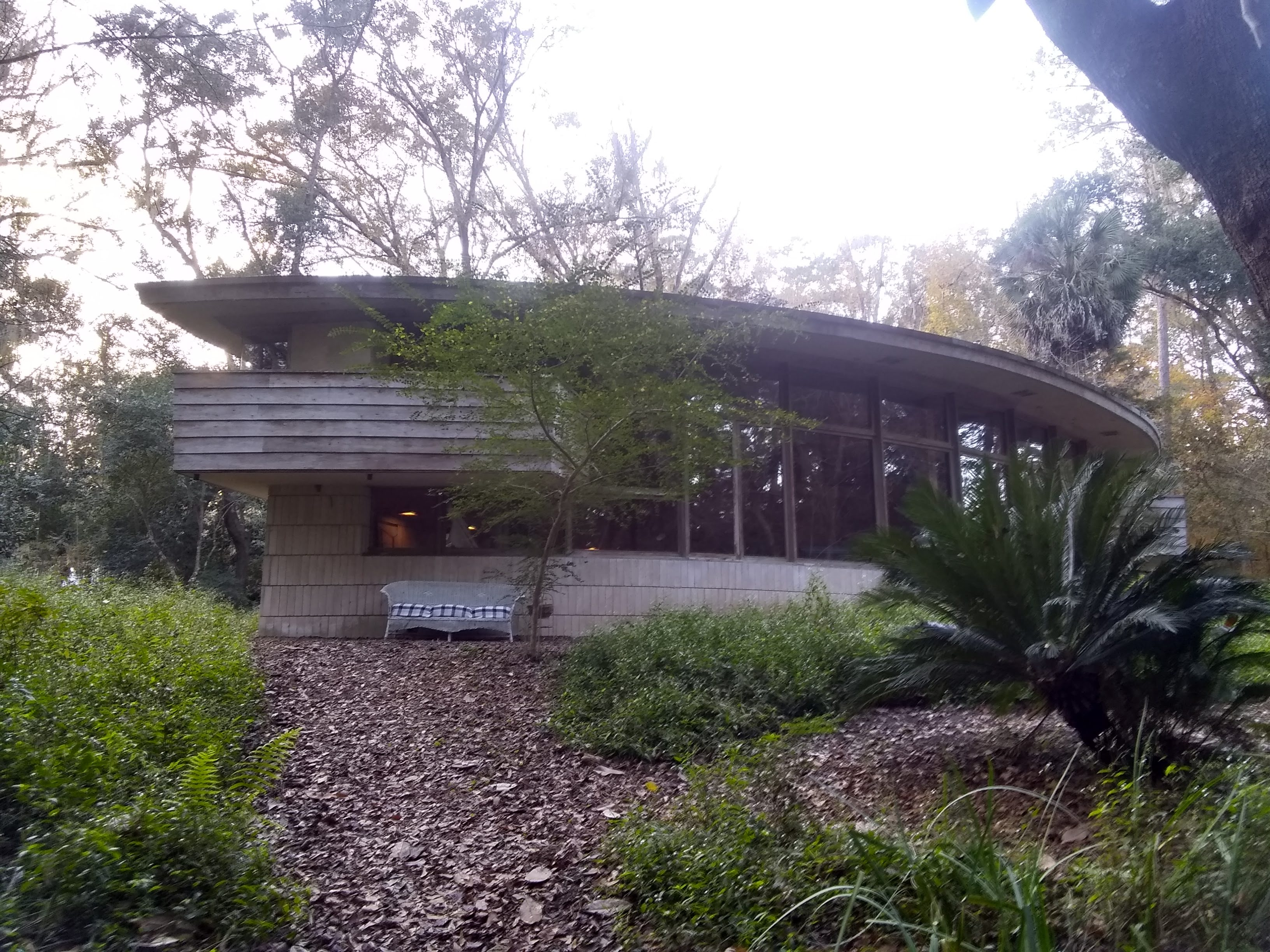
The eastern elevation of the facade, with full-height glass wall

The Lewis family first met Wright in either 1948 or 1950. At the time, Wright was attending the dedication of one of his buildings at Florida Southern College, while Clifton and George were attending a conference on the same campus. While they were touring the campus, Clifton inquired whether Wright was interested in designing a house for someone with "a lot of children and not much money". Wright agreed but asked that they not acquire a traditional land lot, since he wanted to create an organic design that followed the contours of the landscape. He also requested that the family give him a topographical map of the site they wanted.

George Lewis wanted to obtain a site with a spring, since it reminded him of his childhood. He originally wanted to buy a plot of land near Lake Jackson; when he sent over the topographic maps to Wright, the architect wrote back, "Not an expensive house!" After searching for a suitable site for a year, the Lewis family obtained a 10-acre (4.0 ha) grove of pecan trees. Wright drew plans for a house facing a spring on the site; these plans were finished in 1952. The Lewis family named the building "Spring House" because of the spring outside. The Lewises' daughter Byrd Mashburn said that her mother had not liked describing the house's address, saying, "The road is Okeeheepkee, but our home is not Okeeheepkee." The house had an unconventional design with curved walls, and few contractors were willing to work on the project as a result, delaying the project another year.

One of Wright's associates, Nils Schweizer, oversaw the construction of the Spring House. Ernest Daffin, a friend of the Lewis family, supervised construction and introduced them to a contractor named Jack Culpepper. After Culpepper agreed to take the general contract, work began in April 1954. Since Wright had never seen the site before drawing his plans, Schweizer modified the plans to account for external conditions and the Lewises' budget. He added a second bathroom at the family's request, and he modified the foundation, bedrooms, and utility tower. Schweizer was simultaneously working on Florida Southern College, spending weekdays there and weekends at the Lewis House site. The windows were constructed elsewhere, while all other furnishings and millwork were constructed on the site. According to Mashburn, workers had so little confidence in the integrity of the design that, after completing the fireplace, they put sawhorses against it, for fear that it would collapse. The house ultimately cost $42,000, of which 10% went toward paying Wright's commission. Including land, the house cost $48,000.

=== 1950s to 1990s ===
The family moved into the house in December 1954. The swimming pool and the retaining wall around the terrace, which had not been completed, were canceled due to increasing construction costs; for the same reason, they canceled some of the furniture that Wright had planned to design for the house. Clifton said that "finishing the home wasn't our priority", and she later said it was "not an easy house to live in" compared with her previous residence, a mid-19th-century home with a square footprint. Clifton had wanted to plant wildflowers on 5 acres (2.0 ha) of the estate, and she wanted the house to be used for classes. Neighbors described the Lewis Spring House as "the monster", and one of Clifton's acquaintances quipped, "How could you let an atheist design your house?" Byrd Mashburn recalled that she and her siblings slept in twin beds on the second floor. After her brother George Edward went to college, their mother discarded his bed. Mashburn particularly liked the house's exposure to natural light, saying that the movement of moonlight through the rooms during a full moon was "one of the most beautiful things at Spring House".

Though the house was closed to the public, it attracted frequent visitors, many of them fans of Wright's work. The Lewis family were deeply involved in the U.S. civil rights movement, and the house often hosted civil-rights meetings. Because of these meetings, the house was targeted several times by bomb threats. The Lewis Spring House also hosted events such as dance classes and a reception for a Sierra Leonean ambassador. Their civil-rights activism was unpopular for the time; by the 1970s, the Lewises had been ostracized from Tallahassee's upper class, and George had lost his position at the Lewis State Bank. The Spring House was added to the U.S. National Register of Historic Places in 1979. Although NRHP listings were generally required to be 50 years old, the Spring House was listed early, due to its architectural significance as Wright's only residential design in Florida. The house had undergone very few changes over the years, and the Tampa Bay Times said the house "no longer seems so outlandish in a magnolia city that has almost grown up to its level of sophistication.

The surrounding area was built up during the late 1980s, and a developer diverted water away from the site, which made it more vulnerable to floods during heavy rainfall. The roof was replaced after workers discovered deteriorating woodwork and termite infestations. The Spring House Institute was formed in 1996 to help preserve the house. Clifton wanted to convert the house into a restaurant or a senior citizens' residence, and she advocated for the Tallahassee government to rezone the house to permit these uses.

=== 2000s to present ===
By the early 2000s, the house was falling apart, with rotting wood, crumbling bricks, rundown showerheads, and a leaking roof covered by a makeshift piece of plywood. Clifton refused to open the eastern doors, for fear that they would not close again. The site was overgrown, the house had mold infestations and was not air-conditioned, and Clifton lacked the money to make repairs. For sentimental reasons, she did not want to sell the home or even grant a preservation easement restricting changes to the house, despite offers from preservationists; as her daughter Byrd explained, "This is our private home. ... It's not a community project." The suburbs had also grown significantly, to the point that a Waffle House sign was visible from the once-rural site at night. The house's poor condition and the nearby development prompted the Frank Lloyd Wright Building Conservancy to label the house as being at risk.

The Lewis family moved out of the house in 2010, though they continued to own it. In 2012, the American Institute of Architects' Florida chapter placed the house on its list of Florida's top 100 buildings. The house was placed on a list of the state's 11 most endangered places the same year. Work on the restoration began in January 2013, when the Spring House Institute began raising $500,000 for the renovation; proponents of the renovation hoped to raise $350,000 on their own and apply for a matching funds grant from Florida's government. In 2014, the National Trust for Historic Preservation included the house on its annual list of America's Eleven Most Endangered Places. It was also placed on a list of Florida's most endangered historic places. By then, supporters had raised $30,000 toward purchasing the house.

By the mid-2010s, the Spring House was open to the public one day a month. The Spring House Institute raised money by selling tickets for $15, accommodating an average of 1,500 visitors from around the world, and it used the proceeds to repair the building. Mashburn moved back into the house in 2017, staying there until October 2024, when she moved to New Mexico. In August 2025, Mashburn placed the house for sale. Mashburn wanted the house to be used as a cultural institution, following her mother's vision for the house. There were calls for the Florida government to buy the house, and for the property to become to become a park or museum; all three of Tallahassee's colleges also expressed interest in buying the building.

== See also ==
- List of Frank Lloyd Wright works
- National Register of Historic Places listings in Leon County, Florida
- Herbert and Katherine Jacobs Second House, another hemicycle house, designed by Wright in Wisconsin

== Sources ==
- Historic Structures Report: Lewis House (Report). National Register of Historic Places, National Park Service. February 14, 1979.
