= Sharp Family Tourism and Education Center =

Building at Florida Southern College

Coordinates: 28.033260°N 81.949855°W

The Sharp Family Tourism and Education Center is a posthumous addition to Frank Lloyd Wright's Child of the Sun building complex at Florida Southern College in Lakeland, Florida. Wright oversaw the construction of twelve buildings on Florida Southern's campus between 1938 and 1958. He also designed a Usonian house in 1939 meant to be used for faculty housing. Wright produced plans for 14 of the homes to be built on the college campus, but the plan was never carried through. In 2013, the College completed construction of the design as the featured structure in the Sharp Family Tourism and Education Center.

The 1,700 sq. ft. Usonian house features textile-block construction and colored glass inserts in perforated concrete blocks, both signature elements of Wright’s building designs at Florida Southern, as well as furnishings designed by Wright. The two-bedroom house was similar in design to Herbert and Katherine Jacobs First House, the first of Wright’s Usonian houses.

The Sharp Family Tourism and Education Center offers a variety of self-guided, docent-led, and group tours of the Wright campus. The Center provides a home for the permanent display of photographs, furniture, and drawings depicting Wright’s relationship with the College. A documentary film about the Wright’s work at Florida Southern is also available for visitors to view while touring the Usonian house. The Center also acts as a home for visiting exhibits on loan from various other Wright sites.

The Child of the Sun collection is the largest single-site collection of Wright’s work in the world and designated as a National Historic Landmark in 2012.

== See also ==
- List of Frank Lloyd Wright works
