= Ludd M. Spivey =

American education administrator (1886–1962)

Ludd Myrl Spivey (December 5, 1886 – December 27, 1962) was president of Florida Southern College (FSC) from 1925 to 1957. Ludd M. Spivey was born in Eclectic, Alabama. He graduated with two degrees, including a Ph.D., from the University of Chicago. Following his academic career at the University of Chicago, he became the academic dean at Birmingham–Southern College in the early 1920s. In the summer of 1925 he became president of Florida Southern College (FSC) in Lakeland, where he remained the president of the college for 32 years.

In 1931, Ludd Spivey established an art school in Sarasota as a remote branch of Florida Southern College and he served as its chief director. Through several changes including separation from the college in 1933 as a separate nonprofit, adopting the Ringling name among several name changes, and becoming accredited as a degree-granting institution in 1979 and as an accredited art school in 1984, the art school Spivey founded has evolved into Ringling College of Art and Design.

Ludd Spivey met with renowned architect Frank Lloyd Wright in April 1938 in hopes of transforming the small school of Florida Southern into a national landmark. The two men made an agreement that eventually led to the design and construction of academic buildings on campus. Florida Southern College features the largest collection in the world of Frank Lloyd Wright buildings that were constructed for one client. This would become a major legacy for Spivey. In 2011 and 2012, it was selected as the most beautiful campus in America by The Princeton Review. In 2012 due to the historical significance of its buildings, the campus of Florida Southern College was listed on the National Register of Historic Places as a historic district, and it also became a part of the National Historic Landmarks of the United States.

Spivey retired as Florida Southern president on October 15, 1957. Shortly afterward he became ill and died on December 27, 1962.
