= Anne B. Kerr =

American academic and President Emerita of Florida Southern College

President of Florida Southern College
- In office 2004–2024
- Preceded by: Thomas Reuschling
- Succeeded by: Dr. Jeremy Martin

Personal details
- Spouse: Roy Kerr
- Children: Eddie
- Education: Florida State University; Mercer University
- Profession: Higher education

Anne B. Kerr is an American academic and the President Emerita of Florida Southern College.

== Life ==
Kerr attended Mercer University for her bachelor's degree. She received both her master's and doctorate from Florida State University. Kerr is the 17th president in Florida Southern's history. She was inducted into Omicron Delta Kappa at Florida Southern in 2005.

Kerr used to work for the University of Richmond as vice president for institutional advancement. She oversaw the university's alumni affairs, communications, development, and foundation-government grants operations. While there she helped bring the school's master of business administration program, rated among the best in the South by U.S. News & World Report, to a national level.

Her accomplishments at Richmond include the "Transforming Bright Minds" campaign, the most ambitious fund-raising drive in the school's 175-year history, established "to create an institution that is second to none, better than any and different from all.” Toward that end, the campaign raised over $123 million through the 2003-04 academic year, with a goal of $200 million by 2007. The campaign's early success already provided funding for three new endowed faculty chairs and the construction of Weinstein Hall, the University of Richmond's new social sciences building which opened in the fall of 2003.

Prior to her tenure at Richmond, Kerr spent more than 20 years in Central Florida, including 19 at Rollins College in Winter Park, a member of the Sunshine State Conference along with Florida Southern. She began her Rollins career as assistant dean of the Crummer Graduate School of Business in 1983. In 1995, she was named assistant vice president for development, and in 1998 she was appointed vice president for institutional advancement. In that role, Kerr led a capital campaign that raised $160 million two years ahead of schedule and exceeded its goal by $60 million. She was also a founding member of the Rollins College Center for Philanthropy and Non-Profit Leadership.

Before joining the staff at Rollins College, Kerr was assistant dean of students at the University of Central Florida in Orlando. She was also an educational analyst for the Office of the Board of Regents for the State of Florida.

In addition to her duties as a college administrator, Kerr was active with the State of Florida Board of Dance and served as past president of the Southern Ballet Theater/City of Orlando Guild. She was also a member of the Orlando Economics Club and has been involved with United Arts, Leadership Orlando, Coeur de Coeur (American Heart Association), and the Junior League of Orlando.
