= The Complete Uncollected Short Stories of J. D. Salinger, Vol. 1 & 2 =

The Complete Uncollected Short Stories of J. D. Salinger, Volumes 1 & 2
- Volumes 1 of collection.
- Author: J. D. Salinger
- Language: English
- Genre: Short Stories
- Publisher: "John Greenberg" (pseudonym)
- Publication date: 1974
- Publication place: United States
- Media type: Print (paperback)

Neither J. D. Salinger in his lifetime nor his estate after his death has ever authorized the publication of a volume of Salinger's registered early short fiction which appeared in magazines between 1940 and 1965. Reprints of his early stories have appeared under the auspices of Esquire and The New Yorker, to which Salinger stories had originally been sold.

Three of the works from this unauthorized volume were discovered unregistered with the Salinger estate and have since been collected in Three Early Stories (2014), published by Devault-Graves.

== Stories ==
The 22 uncollected stories presented in the unauthorized edition are presented below in alphabetical order.

- "Blue Melody" (Cosmopolitan, September 1948)
- "Both Parties Concerned" (The Saturday Evening Post, 26 February 1944)
- "A Boy in France" (The Saturday Evening Post, 31 March 1945)
- "Elaine" (Story [26], March–April 1945)
- "A Girl I Knew" (Good Housekeeping, February 1948)
- "Go See Eddie" (University of Kansas City Review, December 1940)
- "The Hang of It" (Collier's, 12 July 1941)
- "Hapworth 16, 1924" (The New Yorker, 19 June 1965)
- "The Heart of a Broken Story" (Esquire, September 1941)
- "I'm Crazy" (Collier’s, 22 December 1945)
- "The Inverted Forest" (Cosmopolitan, December 1947)
- "Last Day of the Last Furlough" (Saturday Evening Post, 14 July 1944)
- "The Long Debut of Lois Taggett" (Story [21], September–October 1942)
- "Once a Week Won't Kill You" (Story [25], November–December 1944)
- "Personal Notes of an Infantryman" (Collier’s, 12 December 1942)
- "Slight Rebellion off Madison" (The New Yorker, 21 December 1946)
- "Soft-Boiled Sergeant" (Saturday Evening Post, 26 February 1944)
- "The Stranger" (Collier’s, 1 December 1945)
- "The Varioni Brothers" (Saturday Evening Post, 17 July 1943)
- "This Sandwich Has No Mayonnaise" (Esquire, October 1945)
- "The Young Folks" (Story [16], March–April 1940)
- "A Young Girl in 1941 with No Waist at All" (Mademoiselle, May 1947)

== Background ==
"Salinger’s refusal to collect these tales in hardcover derives from his conviction that they were not worth reprinting. This decision has largely preempted a developmental approach to his work, and it is generally unrecognized that the contours of Holden Caulfield’s character were drawn as early as 1941. A crucial element of Salinger's career is its lacunae ... It is ironic that the published work of Salinger's most public period is least known."—John Wenke in J. D. Salinger: A Study of the Short Fiction (1991).

By 1974, Salinger had not published a novel since his 1963 Raise High the Roof Beam, Carpenters and Seymour: An Introduction, and his most recently published short story, "Hapworth 16, 1924" had appeared in 1965. Fans of Salinger's work turned to his uncollected short fiction that had been published during the 1940s, preserved in old copies of popular literary magazines, primarily Collier's, Esquire and Saturday Evening Post.

In 1974, a pirated collection of 22 works of short fiction—gleaned mostly from these early sources—entitled The Complete Uncollected Short Stories of J. D. Salinger, Volumes 1 and 2, began appearing in bookstores. Though unauthorized by Salinger, an estimated 25,000 copies were printed. Published by "John Greenberg" - a pseudonym used by a number of individuals who peddled the books - copies were retailed in several major book outlets in San Francisco, Chicago and New York. When Salinger discovered that a bootleg collection of his early fiction was being marketed, he took steps to suppress them.

Salinger did not immediately initiate a lawsuit for copyright infringement against the publisher, nor the bookstores that had sold copies. Rather, he arranged a phone interview with New York Times correspondent Lacey Fosburgh to announce his intention to seek damages if distribution did not cease. Salinger, a recluse who coveted his privacy, loathed the prospect of a protracted litigation which would provoke intrusive scrutiny into his personal life by the media.

In his November 3, 1974 interview with Fosburgh entitled "J. D. Salinger Speaks About His Silence" Salinger stated: "I’m not trying to hide the gaucheries of my youth. I just don’t think they are worthy of publication. I wrote them a long time ago and I never had any intention of publishing them [as a collection]. I wanted them to die a perfectly natural death ..."

Biographer Kenneth Slawenski notes that, despite Salinger's protestation that he never intended his early fiction to appear in book form, the author had engaged in protracted discussions with Story magazine editor Whit Burnett during the 1940s concerning publication of a Young Folks anthology. The collection was to be assembled from among the same short fiction that later appeared in the 1974 pirated volume, as well as unpublished work.

Salinger's attorney was able to procure an injunction by the court forbidding the further sale of the bootleg volume. The anonymous "John Greenberg" publishers disbanded and distribution ceased, after which the litigation was dropped. None of the "John Greenbergs" were ever identified, but a number of bookstores paid Salinger damages.

=== Publication of Salinger’s unregistered short fiction (2014) ===
Among Salinger's 21 works of short fiction published during the 1940s, three of these were discovered to have never been registered to the author. Independent publisher Devault-Graves succeeded in obtaining world rights to the stories, after Salinger Trust attorney scrutinized the claim and declined to challenge the publication.

The 2014 collection Three Early Stories includes short fiction published during World War II: "The Young Folks" (1940), Salinger's first published short story; "Go See Eddie" (1940); and "Once a Week Won't Kill You" (1944).

== Critical assessment ==
"The uncollected stories establish Salinger’s abiding thematic and artistic preoccupations. Along with exploring hypocritical and vapid social contexts, they examine their counterforce, the lost idyll. Salinger’s most sympathetic characters find themselves in lonely exile from childhood innocence, or trying to contend with an absent friend or brother. This complex gives retrospective context to Salinger’s early fiction [and] provide access to the more widely known tales published in Nine Stories (1953).—Literary critic John Wenke in J. D. Salinger: A Study of the Short Fiction (1991).

John Wenke regards these early stories as accomplished works of short fiction rather than mere juvenilia: "It is not accurate to see this material as part of Salinger's apprenticeship ... most of the stories were placed in high-profile magazines."

Wenke adds this caveat concerning the relative quality of these works: "The uncollected stories are neither all failures nor a trove of unacknowledged masterpieces."

In seven of these stories, Salinger experimented with the character Holden Caulfield, as well as in two of his unpublished short works, "The Last and Best of the Peter Pans" (1942) and "The Ocean Full of Bowling Balls" (1947).

== Sources ==
- Flood, Alison (July 28, 2014). "J.D. Salinger stories published after 70 years out of print". The Guardian.
- Shields, David; Salerno, Shane (2013). Salinger. New York: Simon & Schuster. ISBN 978-1-4767-4483-4.
- Slawenski, Kenneth (2010). J. D. Salinger: A Life. New York: Random House. ISBN 978-1-4000-6951-4.
- Wenke, John (1991). "J. D. Salinger: A Study of the Short Fiction". In Weaver, Gordon (ed.). Twaynes Studies in Short Fiction. New York: Twayne Publishers. ISBN 0-8057-8334-2.
