= My Foolish Heart (1949 film) =

1949 film by Mark Robson

- Theatrical release poster
- Directed by: Mark Robson
- Screenplay by: Julius J. Epstein; Philip G. Epstein
- Based on: "Uncle Wiggily in Connecticut" by J. D. Salinger
- Produced by: Samuel Goldwyn
- Starring: Dana Andrews; Susan Hayward; Kent Smith; Lois Wheeler; Robert Keith; Jessie Royce Landis
- Cinematography: Lee Garmes
- Edited by: Daniel Mandell
- Music by: Victor Young
- Production company: Samuel Goldwyn Productions
- Distributed by: RKO Radio Pictures
- Release dates: December 25, 1949 (Los Angeles); January 21, 1950 (U.S.)
- Running time: 98 minutes
- Country: United States
- Language: English
- Box office: $1,725,000

My Foolish Heart is a 1949 American romantic drama film directed by Mark Robson, starring Dana Andrews and Susan Hayward. It relates the story of a woman's reflections on the bad turns her life has taken.

Adapted from J. D. Salinger's 1948 short story "Uncle Wiggily in Connecticut", this remains the only authorized film adaptation of Salinger's work. The filmmakers' infidelity to his story was responsible for precluding any other film versions of other Salinger works, including The Catcher in the Rye. The film inspired the Danish story Mit dumme hjerte by Victor Skaarup.

== Plot ==
Near the end of the 1940s, Eloise Winters is in a loveless marriage with businessman Lewis Wengler. She receives an unexpected visit from her former friend Mary Jane. When Lewis returns home that evening, he and Eloise have an argument about divorce and the custody of Ramona. At the sight of one of her old dresses, Eloise remembers her first love. The story up to that point is then told in flashback.

In 1939 in New York City, student Eloise Winters meets Walt Dreiser at a student party. A few days later, Walt asks her to go out with him. For him, it is only an opportunity to have a good time. When Eloise realizes it, she lets him understand that she is a looking for a permanent relationship. Walt continues to chase her, and eventually both end up falling in love.

World War II breaks out and Walt is drafted into the United States Army Air Force. Before going overseas, he asks Eloise to spend a night with him. At first hesitant, she finally accepts the proposition. Realizing she is pregnant, she decides to hide her condition from Walt because she wants him to marry her only for love and not to legitimize the child.

Before a practice mission, Walt starts writing Eloise a letter that he would like to marry her. However, he dies in a plane crash shortly after takeoff. Eloise has no time to mourn, because she has to think about the unborn child. She sees no other way out than to hastily marry Lewis Wengler, who had unsuccessfully courted her before meeting Walt, thereby legitimize the child. Also ending her friendship with Mary Jane, who had been in love with Lewis for a long time.

Back in the present, Eloise wakes up in her bed enlightened by reliving her memories. She wants Lewis and Mary Jane to live together and have custody of Ramona. However, when they see Eloise affectionately interacting with Ramona, Mary Jane tells Eloise to stay with Ramona. While Mary Jane and Lewis leave the house, Eloise stays behind with her daughter.

== Cast ==
- Dana Andrews as Walt Dreiser
- Susan Hayward as Eloise Winters
- Kent Smith as Lewis H. Wengler
- Lois Wheeler as Mary Jane
- Jessie Royce Landis as Martha Winters
- Robert Keith as Henry Winters
- Gigi Perreau as Ramona
- Karin Booth as Miriam Ball
- Todd Karns as Miriam's Escort
- Phillip Pine as Sergeant Lucey
- Martha Mears as Nightclub Singer
- Edna Holland as Dean Whiting
- Jerry Paris as Usher
- Marietta Canty as Grace
- Barbara Woodell as Red Cross receptionist
- Regina Wallace as Mme Crandall
- Neville Brand as Football Game Spectator (uncredited)
- Edward Peil Sr. as Conductor (uncredited)

== Reception ==
After being disappointed, according to biographer Ian Hamilton, when "rumblings from Hollywood" over his 1943 short story "The Varioni Brothers" came to nothing, J.D. Salinger did not hesitate when independent producer Samuel Goldwyn offered to buy the film rights to "Uncle Wiggily in Connecticut". His agent Dorothy Olding later explained this uncharacteristic relinquishing of control with the simple statement that "We thought they would make a good movie".

Indeed, "a good movie" would seem to have been implied by the background of those involved in the production, which included Oscar-winning actress Teresa Wright, and Casablanca screenwriters Julius J. Epstein and Philip G. Epstein. (Some years earlier, Salinger had referenced Casablanca in his 1944 short story "Both Parties Concerned"; one of its characters, upon learning his wife has left him, re-enacts the "Play it, Sam" scene from the film with an imaginary pianist.) However, the eventual film, renamed My Foolish Heart and with Susan Hayward replacing Wright at the last minute, was critically lambasted upon its release.

The New Yorker wrote that it was "full of soap-opera clichés", and, while allowing for "some well-written patches of wryly amusing dialogue", Time rejected it as a "damp fable ... the screenplay turns on all the emotional faucets of a Woman's Home Companion serial". Goldwyn biographer A. Scott Berg explained that "in the Epsteins' version, more than had ever been suggested [in the original story] was shown, resulting in a 'four handkerchief' movie with a farfetched plot". Berg even called the film a "bastardization". Because of what Salinger's agent later called "'a terrible movie' made in the 1950s (sic)" of one of his stories, the author never again relinquished control of his work to Hollywood filmmakers despite persistent interest in a screen adaptation of The Catcher in the Rye.

Despite a critical drubbing, the film was nominated for Academy Awards for Best Actress in a Leading Role (Susan Hayward) and Best Music, Song (Victor Young and Ned Washington for the title song, sung by Martha Mears in a rare onscreen appearance), which has become a jazz standard. The film's standing has not improved with time: in 1996 Christopher Durang called it "a soggy love story." The film critic Andrew Sarris defended the film, although he admitted that as it was his deceased brother's favorite film, so much of the movie's appeal for him was nostalgic.
