= A Boy in France =

- Short story by J. D. Salinger
- Country: United States
- Language: English
- Genre: Historical

Publication
- Published in: The Saturday Evening Post
- Publication type: Magazine
- Publisher: Curtis Publishing Company
- Media type: Print (serial)
- Publication date: 31 March 1945

Chronology
Last Day of the Last Furlough	The Stranger

"A Boy in France" is an uncollected work of short fiction by J. D. Salinger which appeared in the 31 March 1945 issue of The Saturday Evening Post.

The story is the second part of a trio of stories following the character Babe Gladwaller. The first story is "Last Day of the Last Furlough", and the third is "The Stranger".

"A Boy in France" is one of the few Salinger war stories which deals directly with combat conditions. The setting is at the front, as Babe, hunkered down in a foxhole, tries to comfort himself by rereading a letter from his sister. The bond between Babe and Matilda anticipates the relationship between Holden Caulfield and his younger sister Phoebe in Salinger's later novel The Catcher in the Rye.

== Publication ==
First submitted in 1944 as "What Babe Saw, or Ooh-La-La!", the story was then reworked and first published in The Saturday Evening Post, March 31, 1945. It subsequently appeared in the 1946 collection Post Stories 1942–45, edited by Ben Hibbs. The Saturday Evening Post republished the story in its July/August 2010 issue as a memorial to Salinger. There is some doubt that such a republication would have been possible were Salinger still alive.

== Plot summary ==
The protagonist of the story is Babe Gadwaller, identified only as “a boy in France” until the end of the piece. The story starts with Babe finishing his canned army rations. He makes small talk with a comrade and looks for a fox hole to rest in. He silently prays that he will not be hit for not digging his own trench, but he is in too much discomfort to dig one himself.

He finds a "kraut hole" with a bloody blanket still there. He settles into the hole and tries to get comfortable in the confined space. When he is bitten by a red ant he tries to slap the offending insect and is painfully reminded of a fingernail he lost earlier in the day. He then plays a childish mindgame, imagining his finger healed, his body clean and well-clothed, safe and at home "with a nice, quiet girl".

After reading a newspaper clipping and tossing it away, Babe re-reads a letter from his sister Matilda for the "thirty-oddth" time. She asks him over and over if he is in France. Their mother trusts (hopes against hope) that he is still safe in England but Matilda has guessed the truth, that her brother is in harm's way. She also keeps him updated on recent happenings at home (including her opinion of two of his former girlfriends, Jackie and Frances, both mentioned in "Last Day of the Last Furlough"), and wishes that he will come home soon.

== Characters ==
- Babe: In each of the three stories he is markedly different.
- Matilda: She is the only other character featured in each story of the trilogy and is Babe's little sister. Her love and innocence helps Babe to hold on to his humanity. This sibling relationship is a popular theme in Salinger stories, seen also in "For Esmé—with Love and Squalor" and The Catcher in the Rye.

== Style and theme ==
“Within the tomb of the foxhole, Babe sees no mystical apparition...but he does see God, if only through the beauty of his little sister’s innocence...in “A Boy in France,” the existence of God is affirmed, and it is here that Salinger acknowledges his spiritual quest.”—Biographer Kenneth Slawenski in J. D. Salinger: A Life. (2010)

As a means of conveying the “psychological turmoil” suffered by Babe, the “interior monologue is encased within the account of a detached third-person narrator. Salinger thereby conveys Babe’s mental disarray within a framework of realistic action.”

Literary critic John Wenke provides an example in the following passage:

I won’t dig in tonight. I won’t struggle and dig and chop with that damn little entrenching tool tonight. I won’t get hit. Don’t let me get hit, Somebody. Tomorrow night I’ll dig a swell hole, I swear I will.

Babe fabricates “a compensatory fantasy future” while lying in bloodied and stinking “Kraut hole.” He conjures up an attractive woman, who emerges through a portal to read to him from the works of Emily Dickinson and William Blake.

Using a first-person retrospective narrative, Salinger alerts the reader that, despite Babe's life-threatening circumstances, he survives his ordeal.

== Sources ==
- Slawenski, Kenneth. 2010. J. D. Salinger: A Life. Random House, New York. ISBN 978-1-4000-6951-4
- Wenke, John. 1991. J. D. Salinger: A Study of the Short Fiction. Twaynes Studies in Short Fiction, Gordon Weaver, General Editor. Twayne Publishers, New York. ISBN 0-8057-8334-2
