= The Hang of It =

- Short story by J. D. Salinger
- Country: United States
- Language: English

Publication
- Published in: Collier's
- Publication date: July 12, 1941

"The Hang of It" is a short story by J. D. Salinger, first published in the July 12, 1941 issue of Collier's magazine.

== Plot ==
The story begins with Vincent Caulfield, a young soldier in training who struggles to adapt to the physical demands of military life. Vincent is self-conscious about his lack of athletic ability and feels inadequate compared to his more confident and capable peers. This sense of failure is exacerbated when his clumsiness and inability to perform basic drills draw ridicule from both his fellow recruits and his commanding officers.

Despite these challenges, Vincent is determined to fit in and prove his worth. The narrative follows his internal monologue as he wrestles with feelings of humiliation and the pressure to conform to the standards of military life. Salinger paints Vincent as an everyman figure, whose anxieties and struggles with self-image are relatable to readers.

The turning point in the story comes when Vincent is given the opportunity to perform a task or engage in a specific physical challenge. While the exact nature of this task is unclear from surviving references to the story, it is framed as a chance for Vincent to redeem himself in the eyes of his peers. Though Vincent approaches the situation with apprehension, he gradually gains confidence as he begins to improve and master the task.

The resolution of the story leaves Vincent in a more hopeful place. While he may not become a star soldier, he learns to accept himself and focus on personal growth rather than the judgment of others. Salinger subtly critiques the rigid expectations of institutions like the military while celebrating small, personal victories as a form of triumph.

The story is a work of commercial tale about a soldier who just can't seem to get "the hang of it". It was reprinted in the 1942 and 1943 editions of the Kit Book for Soldiers, Sailors, and Marines by Consolidated Book Publishers, Inc.

== Publication history ==
Salinger wrote "The Hang of It" shortly before the United States entered World War II after the attack on Pearl Harbor by Japan in 1941.

Discerning the "popular appetite for positive short stories about the military," Salinger abandoned any pretense at providing "psychological depth" and crafted an O. Henry-like tale with broad appeal. "The Hang of It" was published by Collier's on July 12, 1941, show-cased in an illustrated single-page format in small typeface. Salinger thought highly of "The Hang of It" and was deeply gratified when Collier's published the work, considering it a milestone in his early professional career.

The story was selected for inclusion in the US Army's 1942 and 1943 editions of Kit Book for Soldiers, Sailors and Marines, issued to servicemen as illustrated literary entertainment. In 1943, Salinger's publications in literary journals, including "The Hang of It", was brought to the attention of his superior officers. He was immediately assigned to the Air Force Service Command's Public Relations Department in 1943 in Dayton, Ohio. While working in war-time public relations for the military, Salinger was screened and tapped to serve as a noncommissioned officer in the CIC. Proficient in German and French, he served as an interrogator of captured German soldiers and officers.

Biographer Kenneth Slawenski speculates, based on correspondence between Ned Bradford, editor-in-chief at Little, Brown and Company publishers and Salinger, that the author considered authorizing a volume of World War II-related stories, including his 1941 "The Hang of It."

== Critical assessment ==
Slawenski dismisses this early effort, describing "The Hang of It" as "lacking in quality but easily sold to popular magazines." Calling the story "a brief, sentimental failure" John Wenke reports that "The Hang of It" and "Personal Notes of an Infantryman" qualify only as "patriotic bromides in prose that are resolved in cute-to-sickening surprise endings." Remarking upon the "glib" handling of the narrative and its "cloying" ending, literary critic John Wenke adds this:

These portraits offer idealized accounts of unreflecting people parading through a comic-book military. What is remarkable is that "The Hang of It" [is] completely unlike Salinger's more expansive tales of men and boys at war."

Indeed, the story contrasts sharply with Salinger's compassionate treatment of WWII experiences of American G.I.s, in particular his "Soft-Boiled Sergeant" (1944), originally titled "Death of a Dogface."

== Sources ==
- Shields, David and Salerno, Shane. 2013. Salinger. Simon & Schuster, New York. ISBN 978-1-4767-4483-4
- Slawenski, Kenneth. 2010. J. D. Salinger: A Life. Random House, New York. ISBN 978-1-4000-6951-4
- Wenke, John. 1991. J. D. Salinger: A Study of the Short Fiction. Twaynes Studies in Short Fiction, Gordon Weaver, General Editor. Twayne Publishers, New York. ISBN 0-8057-8334-2
