= The Children's Echelon =

"The Children’s Echelon"
- Short story by J. D. Salinger
- Country: United States
- Language: English

Publication
- Published in: Unpublished

"The Children’s Echelon" is an unpublished work of short fiction by J. D. Salinger written in 1944 when the author was serving in combat during World War II. The work was referred to as both “The Children’s Echelon” and “Total War Diary” in Salinger’s professional correspondence. It can be located in the Firestone Library in Princeton University.

== Summary ==
The story is in the form of eleven diary entries by Bernice Herndon with the first entry on January 12, her 18th birthday, and the last on March 25 of the same but unspecified year. With the war escalating in the background, Bernice changes her opinion about almost everything she mentions - her friends, family, and the war. In one entry, Bernice, like Holden Caulfield, mentions that she loved to watch children at the merry-go-round. (Bernice recalls the time at the carousel when "one darling little boy in a navy blue suit and beanie...nearly fell off the horse once and I nearly screamed.")

== Background ==
Salinger struggled to write “The Children’s Echelon.” while he was stationed in England with the 12th Infantry Regiment during preparations for the D-Day invasions.

Alternating between a first-person and third-person narratives while writing the work, Salinger had grave doubts as to the worthiness of the piece, which he initially attempted to model on Ring Lardner’s “I Can’t Breathe.” Biographer Kenneth Slawenski notes that “the work ran to twenty-six pages and 6,000 words, by far the longest story he had ever written.”

When Salinger submitted the work for consideration to editor Whit Burnett at Story, Burnett delivered “the most scathing critique ever suffered by a Salinger work.” Though Burnett acknowledged that the work had some merits, a Story interoffice memo registered: “In these times it would be a waste of paper to print the story.”

Salinger personally attributed the story’s failure to its length. Biographer Kenneth Slawenski remarks upon the story’s “overdrawn length and aimlessness…”

Salinger, an author who produced short fiction that typically did not run over 12 pages, “The Children’s Echelon” is exceeds two dozen. As such, Story editor Whit Burnett harbored doubts concerning Salinger’s “commitment” to writing a novel Salinger attempted to compensate for this apparent limitation by writing his works in more manageable “segments” which could be linked to form a book, or presented individually as short fiction.

Salinger is known to have referred to this work both as “The Children’s Echelon” and “Total War Diary.” in his correspondence. As the story was never published “it is known by both names today.”

== Sources ==
- Slawenski, Kenneth. 2010. J. D. Salinger: A Life. Random House, New York. ISBN 978-1-4000-6951-4
