= Go See Eddie =

- Short story by J. D. Salinger
- Country: United States
- Language: English

Publication
- Published in: University of Kansas City Review
- Publication date: December 1940

"Go See Eddie" is a short story by J. D. Salinger published in the University of Kansas City Review in December 1940. The story is included in the 2014 Salinger collection Three Early Stories.

== Plot ==
Helen, an aspiring actor, becomes romantically involved with Phil Stone while visiting Chicago. Phil, a married man, has introduced beautiful Helen to a socially exclusive world of wealth and dissipation. She thrives in this milieu, amusing herself by playing the femme fatale.

Helen's brother Bobby, a booking agent, is appalled that his sister, a good-natured and decent-spirited young woman, has been traduced by this pretentious crowd. Bobby, fearing that Helen's good character will be distorted, encourages her to contact Eddie Jackson, who is producing a local stage play. Helen agrees to disengage from Phil and his degenerate friends and pursue her acting career.

== Background ==
After his first success seeing his short story "The Young Folks" (1940) published in Story, Salinger made various story submissions to a number of journals which responded with rejection slips. "Go See Eddie" was repeatedly turned down by Whit Burnett at Story, by Esquire, and by a number of other journals.

Dejected, Salinger briefly considered becoming a playwright and adapting "The Young Folks" to a stage play in which he would perform the lead character. After a month long sojourn in Canada, he returned to the USA fully re-committed to pursuing a career as a short-story writer.

"Go See Eddie" was ultimately accepted for publication by the University of Kansas City Review, "an academic magazine with limited circulation," appearing in its December 1940 edition.

== Theme ==
"Go See Eddie" is one of a number of Salinger's uncollected stories that deals with "characters who become involved in degrading, often phony social contexts." An examination of "social manners [and] the corruption of innocence" the story, "though slight in range, foreshadows Salinger's more searching explorations of innocence either threatened or lost" according to literary critic John Wenke.

== Sources ==
- Slawenski, Kenneth. 2010. J. D. Salinger: A Life. Random House, New York. ISBN 978-1-4000-6951-4
- Wenke, John. 1991. J. D. Salinger: A Study of the Short Fiction. Twaynes Studies in Short Fiction, Gordon Weaver, General Editor. Twayne Publishers, New York. ISBN 0-8057-8334-2
