= J. D. Salinger =

American writer (1919–2010)

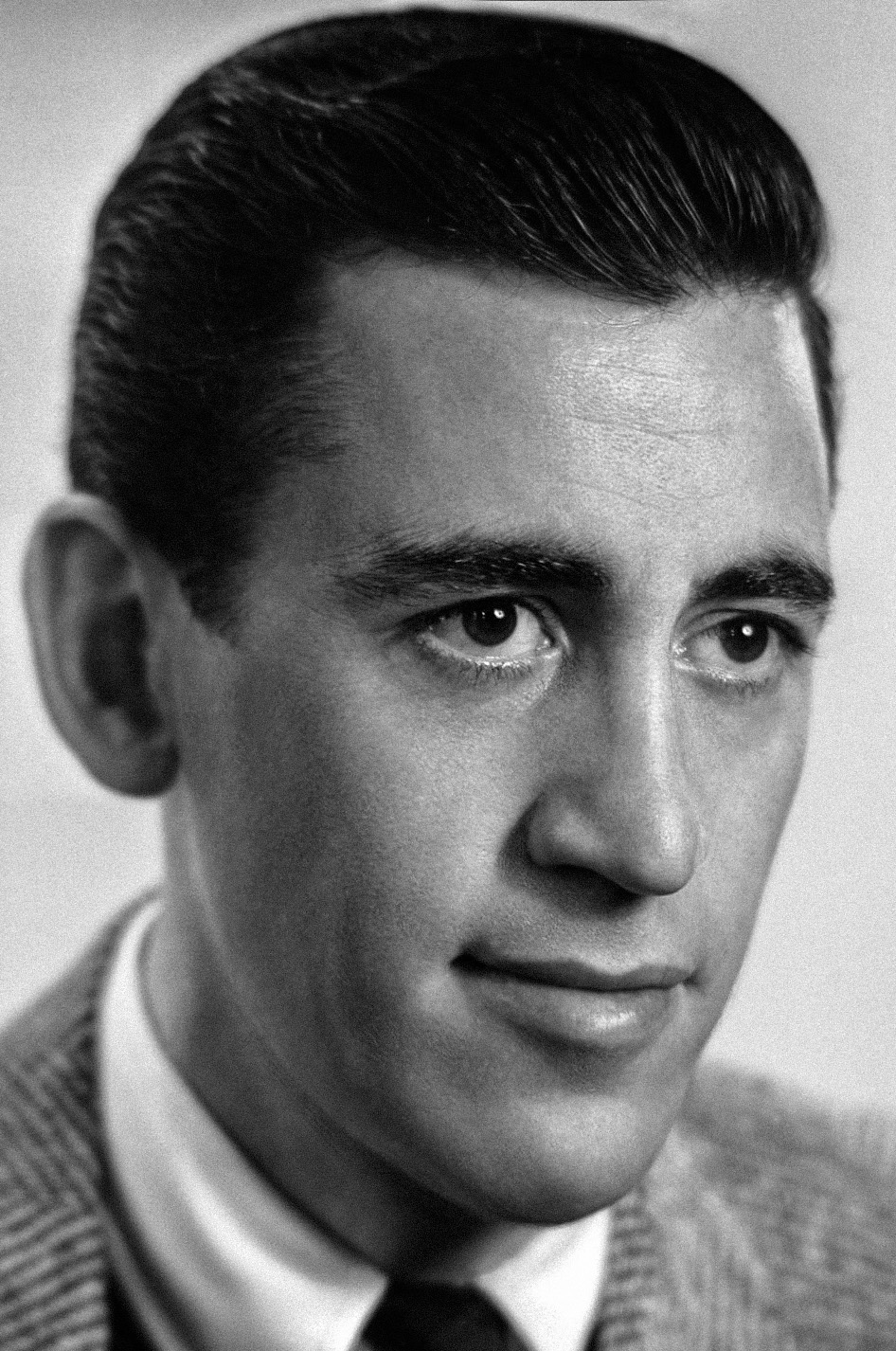
- Salinger in 1950
- Born: Jerome David Salinger; January 1, 1919; New York City, U.S.
- Died: January 27, 2010 (aged 91); Cornish, New Hampshire, U.S.
- Occupations: Novelist; short-story writer
- Spouses: Sylvia Welter (m. 1945; div. 1947); Claire Douglas (m. 1955; div. 1967); Colleen O'Neill (m. 1988)
- Children: 2, including Matt
- Writing career
- Years active: 1940–1965
- Notable works: The Catcher in the Rye (1951); Nine Stories (1953); Franny and Zooey (1961); Raise High the Roof Beam, Carpenters and Seymour: An Introduction (1963)

Jerome David Salinger (/ˈsælɪndʒər/ SAL-in-jər; January 1, 1919 – January 27, 2010) was an American writer best known for his 1951 novel The Catcher in the Rye. Salinger published several short stories in Story magazine in 1940, before serving in World War II. In 1948, his critically acclaimed story "A Perfect Day for Bananafish" appeared in The New Yorker, which published much of his later work.

The Catcher in the Rye was an immediate popular success; Salinger's depiction of adolescent alienation and loss of innocence was influential, especially among adolescent readers. The novel was widely read and controversial, (Note: See Beidler's A Reader's Companion to J. D. Salinger's The Catcher in the Rye.) and its success led to public attention and scrutiny. Salinger became reclusive, publishing less frequently. He followed Catcher with a short story collection, Nine Stories (1953); Franny and Zooey (1961), a volume containing a novella and a short story; and a volume containing two novellas, Raise High the Roof Beam, Carpenters and Seymour: An Introduction (1963). Salinger's last published work, the novella Hapworth 16, 1924, appeared in The New Yorker on June 19, 1965.

Afterward, Salinger struggled with unwanted attention, including a legal battle in the 1980s with biographer Ian Hamilton and the release in the late 1990s of memoirs written by two people close to him: his former lover Joyce Maynard and his daughter Margaret Salinger. Salinger died of natural causes in 2010.

== Early life ==
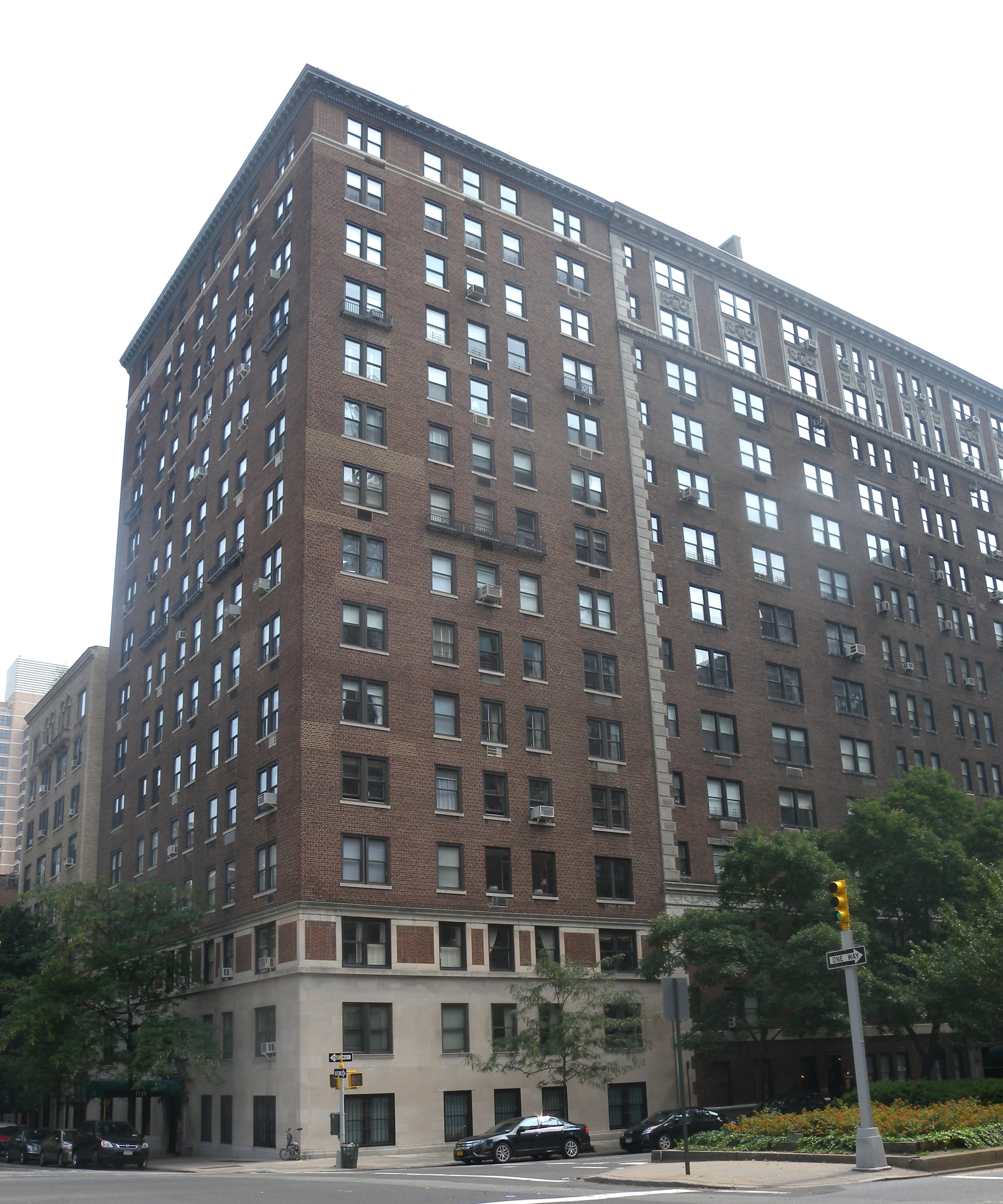
Where Salinger grew up, 1133 Park Avenue in Manhattan

Jerome David Salinger was born in Manhattan, New York City, on January 1, 1919. His father, Sol Salinger, traded in kosher cheese, and was from a family of Lithuanian-Jewish descent from the Russian Empire. Sol's father was the rabbi for Adath Jeshurun Congregation in Louisville, Kentucky.

Salinger's mother, Marie (née Jillich), was born in Atlantic, Iowa, of German, Irish, and Scottish descent, "but changed her first name to Miriam to appease her in-laws" and considered herself Jewish after marrying Salinger's father. Salinger did not learn that his mother was not of Jewish ancestry until just after he celebrated his bar mitzvah. He had one sibling, an older sister, Doris (1912–2001).

In his youth, Salinger attended public schools on the West Side of Manhattan. In 1932, the family moved to Park Avenue, and Salinger enrolled at the McBurney School, a nearby private school. Salinger had trouble fitting in and took measures to conform, such as calling himself Jerry. His family called him Sonny. At McBurney, he managed the fencing team, wrote for the school newspaper and appeared in plays. He "showed an innate talent for drama," though his father opposed the idea of his becoming an actor. His parents then enrolled him at Valley Forge Military Academy in Wayne, Pennsylvania. Salinger began writing stories "under the covers [at night], with the aid of a flashlight". He was the literary editor of the class yearbook, Crossed Sabres, and participated in the glee club, aviation club, French club, and the Non-Commissioned Officers Club.

Salinger's Valley Forge Military Personnel File says he was a "mediocre" student, and his recorded IQ between 111 and 115 was slightly above average. He graduated in 1936. Salinger started his freshman year at New York University in 1936. He considered studying special education but dropped out the following year. His father urged him to learn about the meat-importing business, and he went to work at a company in Vienna and Bydgoszcz, Poland. Salinger was disgusted by the slaughterhouses and decided to pursue a different career. This disgust and his rejection of his father likely influenced his vegetarianism as an adult.

In late 1938, Salinger attended Ursinus College in Collegeville, Pennsylvania, and wrote a column called "skipped diploma", which included movie reviews. He dropped out after one semester. In 1939, Salinger attended the Columbia University School of General Studies in Manhattan, where he took a writing class taught by Whit Burnett, longtime editor of Story magazine. According to Burnett, Salinger did not distinguish himself until a few weeks before the end of the second semester, at which point "he suddenly came to life" and completed three stories. Burnett told Salinger that his stories were skillful and accomplished, accepting "The Young Folks," a vignette about several aimless youths, for publication in Story. Salinger's debut short story was published in the magazine's March–April 1940 issue. Burnett became Salinger's mentor, and they corresponded for several years.

== World War II ==
In 1942, Salinger started dating Oona O'Neill, daughter of the playwright Eugene O'Neill. Despite finding her self-absorbed (he confided to a friend that "Little Oona's hopelessly in love with little Oona"), he called her often and wrote her long letters. Their relationship ended when Oona began seeing Charlie Chaplin, whom she eventually married. In late 1941, Salinger briefly worked on a Caribbean cruise ship, serving as an activity director and possibly a performer.

Between 1941 and 1943, Salinger sent nine letters and postcards to Marjorie Sheard, an aspiring Canadian writer, including one in which he mentions his first Holden Caulfield story. The Morgan Library & Museum acquired the letters in 2013 and displayed them in an exhibit, "'Lose not heart': J. D. Salinger's Letters to an Aspiring Writer".

The same year, Salinger began submitting short stories to The New Yorker. The magazine rejected seven of his stories that year, including "Lunch for Three," "Monologue for a Watery Highball," and "I Went to School with Adolf Hitler." But in December 1941, it accepted "Slight Rebellion off Madison," a Manhattan-set story about a disaffected teenager named Holden Caulfield with "pre-war jitters". When Japan carried out the attack on Pearl Harbor that month, the story was rendered "unpublishable." Salinger was devastated. The story appeared in The New Yorker in 1946, after the war ended.

In early 1942, several months after the U.S. entered World War II, Salinger was drafted into the army, where he saw combat as a counterintelligence agent with the 12th Infantry Regiment, 4th Infantry Division. He was present at Utah Beach on D-Day, in the Battle of the Bulge, and in the Battle of Hürtgen Forest.

During the campaign from Normandy into Germany, Salinger arranged to meet Ernest Hemingway, a writer who had influenced him and was then working as a war correspondent in Paris. Salinger was impressed with Hemingway's friendliness and modesty, finding him more "soft" than his gruff public persona. Hemingway was impressed by Salinger's writing and remarked: "Jesus, he has a helluva talent." The two began corresponding; Salinger wrote to Hemingway in July 1946 that their talks were among his few positive memories of the war, and added that he was working on a play about Caulfield and hoped to play the part himself.

Salinger was assigned to a counterintelligence unit also known as the Ritchie Boys, in which he used his proficiency in French and German to interrogate prisoners of war. In April 1945 he entered Kaufering IV concentration camp, a subcamp of Dachau. Salinger earned the rank of Staff Sergeant and served in five campaigns. His war experiences affected him emotionally. After Germany was defeated, he committed himself for a few weeks for combat stress reaction, specifically to a civilian hospital in Nuremberg instead of a military one, because he did not want to be sent home with an official Army psych discharge. He later told his daughter: "You never really get the smell of burning flesh out of your nose entirely, no matter how long you live." Salinger's biographers speculate that he drew upon his wartime experiences in several stories, such as "For Esmé—with Love and Squalor", which is narrated by a traumatized soldier. Salinger continued to write while serving in the army, publishing several stories in slick magazines such as Collier's and The Saturday Evening Post. He also continued to submit stories to The New Yorker, but with little success; it rejected all of his submissions from 1944 to 1946, including a group of 15 poems in 1945.

== Postwar years ==
After Germany's defeat, Salinger signed up for a six-month period of denazification duty in Germany for the Counterintelligence Corps. He lived in Weißenburg and, soon after, married Sylvia Welter. He brought her to the United States in April 1946, but the marriage fell apart after eight months and Sylvia returned to Germany. In 1972, Salinger's daughter Margaret was with him when he received a letter from Sylvia. He looked at the envelope, and, without reading it, tore it apart. It was the first time he had heard from her since the breakup but, as Margaret put it, "when he was finished with a person, he was through with them."

In 1946, Whit Burnett agreed to help Salinger publish a collection of his short stories through Story Press's Lippincott Imprint. The collection, The Young Folks, was to consist of 20 stories—ten, like the title story and "Slight Rebellion off Madison", already in print and ten previously unpublished. Though Burnett implied the book would be published and even negotiated Salinger a $1,000 advance, Lippincott overruled Burnett and rejected the book. Salinger blamed Burnett for the book's failure to see print, and the two became estranged.

By the late 1940s, Salinger had become an avid follower of Zen Buddhism, to the point that he "gave reading lists on the subject to his dates".

In 1947, Salinger submitted a short story, "The Bananafish", to The New Yorker. William Maxwell, the magazine's fiction editor, was impressed enough with "the singular quality of the story" that the magazine asked Salinger to continue revising it. He spent a year reworking it with New Yorker editors and the magazine published it, now titled "A Perfect Day for Bananafish", in the January 31, 1948, issue. The magazine thereon offered Salinger a "first-look" contract that allowed it right of first refusal on any future stories. The critical acclaim accorded "Bananafish" coupled with problems Salinger had with stories being altered by the "slicks" led him to publish almost exclusively in The New Yorker. "Bananafish" was also the first of Salinger's published stories to feature the Glasses, a fictional family consisting of two retired vaudeville performers and their seven precocious children: Seymour, Buddy, Boo Boo, Walt, Waker, Zooey, and Franny. Salinger published seven stories about the Glasses, developing a detailed family history and focusing particularly on Seymour, the brilliant but troubled eldest child.

In the early 1940s, Salinger confided in a letter to Burnett that he was eager to sell the film rights to some of his stories to achieve financial security. According to Ian Hamilton, Salinger was disappointed when "rumblings from Hollywood" over his 1943 short story "The Varioni Brothers" came to nothing. Therefore, he immediately agreed when, in mid-1948, independent film producer Samuel Goldwyn offered to buy the film rights to his short story "Uncle Wiggily in Connecticut." Though Salinger sold the story with the hope—in the words of his agent Dorothy Olding—that it "would make a good movie", critics lambasted the film upon its release in 1949. Renamed My Foolish Heart and starring Dana Andrews and Susan Hayward, the film departed to such an extent from Salinger's story that Goldwyn biographer A. Scott Berg called it a "bastardization."

As a result of this experience, Salinger never again permitted film adaptations of his work. When Brigitte Bardot wanted to buy the rights to "A Perfect Day for Bananafish", Salinger refused, but told his friend Lillian Ross, longtime staff writer for The New Yorker, "She's a cute, talented, lost enfante, and I'm tempted to accommodate her, pour le sport."

== The Catcher in the Rye ==
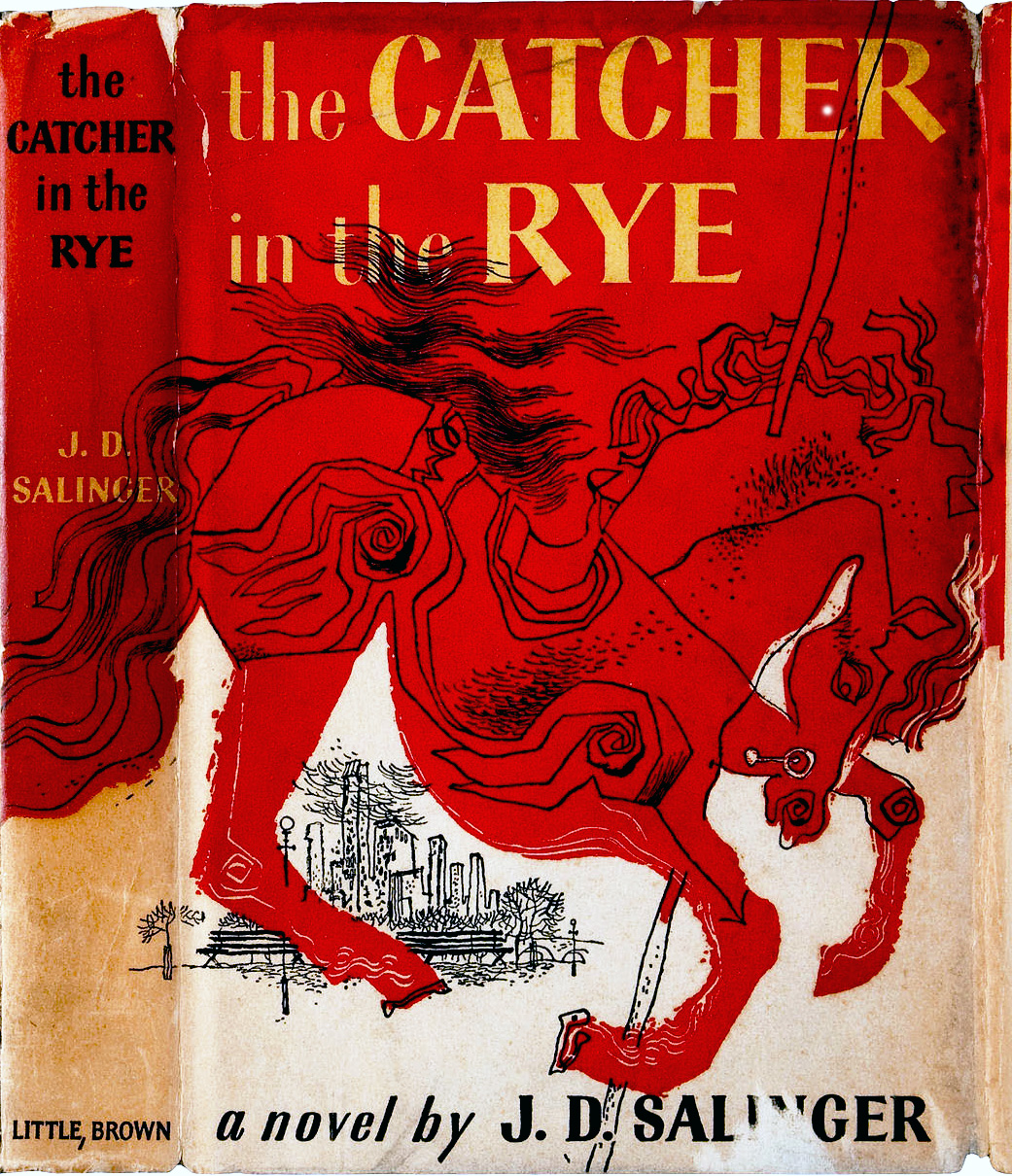
Cover and spine of The Catcher in the Rye, first edition

In the 1940s, Salinger told several people that he was working on a novel featuring Holden Caulfield, the teenage protagonist of his short story "Slight Rebellion off Madison", and Little, Brown and Company published The Catcher in the Rye on July 16, 1951. Letters released in 2026 show that during production Salinger asked editor John Woodburn to remove references to his Jewish and Irish background from the dust jacket because he feared reviewers would overemphasize it. The novel's plot is straightforward, detailing 17-year-old Holden's experiences in New York City after his fourth expulsion and departure from an elite college preparatory school.

The book is more notable for the persona and testimonial voice of its first-person narrator, Holden. He serves as an insightful but unreliable narrator who expounds on the importance of loyalty, the "phoniness" of adulthood, and his own duplicity. In a 1953 interview with a high school newspaper, Salinger admitted that the novel was "sort of" autobiographical, explaining, "My boyhood was very much the same as that of the boy in the book, and it was a great relief telling people about it."

Initial reactions to the book were mixed, ranging from The New York Times hailing Catcher as "an unusually brilliant first novel" to denigrations of the book's monotonous language and Holden's "immorality and perversion" (he uses religious slurs and freely discusses casual sex and prostitution). The novel was a popular success; within two months of its publication, it had been reprinted eight times. It spent 30 weeks on the New York Times Bestseller list. The book's initial success was followed by a brief lull in popularity, but by the late 1950s, according to Salinger's biographer Ian Hamilton, it had "become the book all brooding adolescents had to buy, the indispensable manual from which cool styles of disaffectation could be borrowed." It has been compared with Mark Twain's The Adventures of Huckleberry Finn. Newspapers began publishing articles about the "Catcher Cult", and the novel was banned in several countries—as well as some U.S. schools—because of its subject matter and what Catholic World reviewer Riley Hughes called an "excessive use of amateur swearing and coarse language". According to one angry parent's tabulation, 237 instances of "goddamn", 58 uses of "bastard", 31 "Chrissakes", and one incident of flatulence constituted what was wrong with Salinger's book.

In the 1970s, several U.S. high school teachers who assigned the book were fired or forced to resign. A 1979 study of censorship noted that The Catcher in the Rye "had the dubious distinction of being at once the most frequently censored book across the nation and the second-most frequently taught novel in public high schools" (after John Steinbeck's Of Mice and Men). The book remains widely read; as of 2004, it was selling about 250,000 copies per year, "with total worldwide sales over 10 million copies".

In the wake of its 1950s success, Salinger received (and rejected) numerous offers to adapt The Catcher in the Rye for the screen, including one from Samuel Goldwyn. Since its publication, there has been sustained interest in the novel among filmmakers, with Billy Wilder, Harvey Weinstein, and Steven Spielberg among those seeking to secure the rights. In the 1970s Salinger said, "Jerry Lewis tried for years to get his hands on the part of Holden." Salinger repeatedly refused, and in 1999 his ex-lover Joyce Maynard concluded, "The only person who might ever have played Holden Caulfield would have been J. D. Salinger."

== Writing in the 1950s and move to Cornish ==
In a July 1951 profile in Book of the Month Club News, Salinger's friend and New Yorker editor William Maxwell asked Salinger about his literary influences. He replied, "A writer, when he's asked to discuss his craft, ought to get up and call out in a loud voice just the names of the writers he loves. I love Kafka, Flaubert, Tolstoy, Chekhov, Dostoevsky, Proust, O'Casey, Rilke, Lorca, Keats, Rimbaud, Burns, E. Brontë, Jane Austen, Henry James, Blake, Coleridge. I won't name any living writers. I don't think it's right" (although O'Casey was in fact alive at the time). In letters from the 1940s, Salinger expressed his admiration of three living, or recently deceased, writers: Sherwood Anderson, Ring Lardner, and F. Scott Fitzgerald; Ian Hamilton wrote that Salinger even saw himself for some time as "Fitzgerald's successor". Salinger's "A Perfect Day for Bananafish" has an ending similar to that of Fitzgerald's story "May Day".

Salinger wrote friends of a momentous change in his life in 1952, after several years of practicing Zen Buddhism, while reading The Gospel of Sri Ramakrishna about Hindu religious teacher Sri Ramakrishna. He became an adherent of Ramakrishna's Advaita Vedanta Hinduism, which advocated celibacy for those seeking enlightenment, and detachment from human responsibilities such as family. Salinger's religious studies were reflected in some of his writing. The story "Teddy", published in 1953, features a ten-year-old child who expresses Vedantic insights. He also studied the writings of Ramakrishna's disciple Vivekananda; in "Hapworth 16, 1924", Seymour Glass calls him "one of the most exciting, original and best-equipped giants of this century."

In 1953, Salinger published a collection of seven stories from The New Yorker (including "Bananafish"), as well as two the magazine had rejected. The collection was published as Nine Stories in the United States, and "For Esmé—with Love and Squalor" in the UK, after one of Salinger's best-known stories. The book received grudgingly positive reviews, and was a financial success—"remarkably so for a volume of short stories," according to Hamilton. Nine Stories spent three months on the New York Times Bestseller list.

As The Catcher in the Rye's notability grew, Salinger gradually withdrew from public view. In 1953, he moved from an apartment at 300 East 57th Street, New York, to Cornish, New Hampshire. Early in his time at Cornish he was relatively sociable, particularly with students at Windsor High School. Salinger invited them to his house frequently to play records and talk about problems at school. One such student, Shirley Blaney, persuaded Salinger to be interviewed for the high school page of The Daily Eagle, the city paper. After the interview appeared prominently in the newspaper's editorial section, Salinger cut off all contact with the high schoolers without explanation. He was also seen less frequently around town, meeting only one close friend—jurist Learned Hand—with any regularity.

== Second marriage, family, and spiritual beliefs ==
In February 1955, at age 36, Salinger married Claire Douglas (b. 1933), a student at Radcliffe and daughter of art critic Robert Langton Douglas. They had two children, Margaret Salinger (also known as Peggy – born December 10, 1955) and Matthew "Matt" Salinger (born February 13, 1960). Margaret Salinger wrote in her memoir Dream Catcher that she believes her parents would not have married, nor would she have been born, had her father not read the teachings of Lahiri Mahasaya, a guru of Paramahansa Yogananda, which brought the possibility of enlightenment to those following the path of the "householder" (a married person with children). After their marriage, Salinger and Claire were initiated into the path of Kriya Yoga in a small store-front Hindu temple in Washington, D.C., during the summer of 1955. They received a mantra and breathing exercise to practice for 10 minutes twice a day.

Salinger also insisted that Claire drop out of school and live with him, only four months shy of graduation, which she did. Certain elements of the story "Franny," published in January 1955, are based on his relationship with Claire, including her ownership of the book The Way of the Pilgrim. Because of their isolated location in Cornish and Salinger's proclivities, they hardly saw other people for long stretches of time. Claire was also frustrated by Salinger's ever-changing religious beliefs. Claire committed herself to Kriya yoga, but Salinger often left Cornish to work on a story "for several weeks only to return with the piece he was supposed to be finishing all undone or destroyed and some new 'ism' we had to follow." Claire believed "it was to cover the fact that Jerry had just destroyed or junked or couldn't face the quality of, or couldn't face publishing, what he had created."

After abandoning Kriya yoga, Salinger tried Dianetics (the forerunner of Scientology), even meeting its founder L. Ron Hubbard, but according to Claire was quickly disenchanted with it. This was followed by an adherence to a number of spiritual, medical, and nutritional belief systems, including Christian Science, Edgar Cayce, homeopathy, acupuncture, macrobiotics, and, like a number of other writers in the 1960s, Sufism.

Salinger's family life was further marked by discord after his first child was born; according to Margaret's book, Claire felt that her daughter had replaced her in Salinger's affections. The infant Margaret was sick much of the time, but Salinger, having embraced Christian Science, refused to take her to a doctor. According to Margaret, her mother admitted to her years later that she went "over the edge" in the winter of 1957 and had made plans to murder her and then commit suicide. Claire had supposedly intended to do it during a trip to New York City with Salinger, but she instead acted on a sudden impulse to take Margaret from the hotel and run away. After a few months, Salinger persuaded her to return to Cornish.

The Salingers divorced in 1967, with Claire getting custody of the children. Salinger remained close to his family. He built a new house for himself across the road and visited frequently; Salinger continued to live there until his death in 2010.

== Last publications and Maynard relationship ==
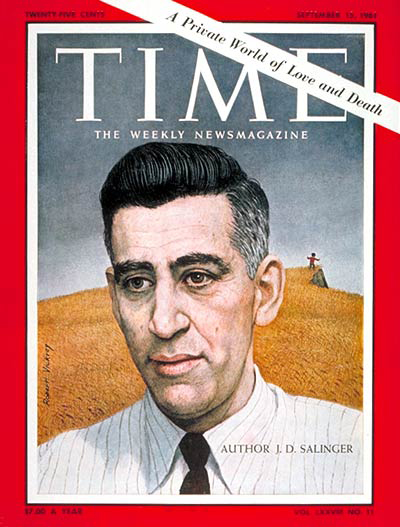
Salinger on the cover of Time (September 15, 1961)

Salinger published Franny and Zooey in 1961 and Raise High the Roof Beam, Carpenters and Seymour: An Introduction in 1963. Each book contained two short stories or novellas published in The New Yorker between 1955 and 1959, and were the only stories Salinger had published since Nine Stories. On the dust jacket of Franny and Zooey, Salinger wrote, in reference to his interest in privacy: "It is my rather subversive opinion that a writer's feelings of anonymity-obscurity are the second most valuable property on loan to him during his working years."

On September 15, 1961, Time magazine devoted its cover to Salinger. In an article that profiled his "life of recluse", the magazine reported that the Glass family series "is nowhere near completion ... Salinger intends to write a Glass trilogy." But Salinger published only one other thing after that: "Hapworth 16, 1924", a novella in the form of a long letter by seven-year-old Seymour Glass to his parents from summer camp. His first new work in six years, the novella took up most of the June 19, 1965, issue of The New Yorker, and was universally panned by critics. Around this time, Salinger had isolated Claire from friends and relatives and made her—in Margaret Salinger's words—"a virtual prisoner". Claire separated from him in September 1966; their divorce was finalized on October 3, 1967.

In 1972, at age 53, Salinger had a relationship with 18-year-old Joyce Maynard that lasted for nine months. Maynard was already an experienced writer for Seventeen magazine. The New York Times had asked her to write an article that, when published as "An Eighteen-Year-Old Looks Back On Life" on April 23, 1972, made her a celebrity. Salinger wrote her a letter warning about living with fame. After exchanging 25 letters, Maynard moved in with Salinger after her freshman year at Yale University. She did not return to Yale that year, and spent ten months as a guest in Salinger's house. The relationship ended, he told Margaret at a family outing, because Maynard wanted children, and he felt he was too old.

In her autobiography, Maynard paints a different picture, saying Salinger abruptly ended the relationship, sent her away, and refused to take her back. She had dropped out of Yale to be with him, even forgoing a scholarship. Maynard came to find out that Salinger had begun several relationships with young women by exchanging letters. One of them was his last wife, a nurse who was already engaged to be married to someone else when she met him. In a 2021 Vanity Fair article, Maynard wrote,

I was groomed to be the sexual partner of a narcissist who nearly derailed my life [...] [in] the years that followed, I heard from well over a dozen women who had a similar set of treasured letters from Salinger in their possession, written to them when they were teenagers. It appeared that in the case of one girl, Salinger was writing letters to her while I sat in the next room, believing he was my soul mate and partner for life.

While living with Maynard, Salinger continued to write in a disciplined fashion, a few hours every morning. According to Maynard, by 1972 he had completed two new novels. In a 1974 interview with The New York Times, he said, "There is a marvelous peace in not publishing ... I like to write. I love to write. But I write just for myself and my own pleasure." According to Maynard, he saw publication as "a damned interruption". In her memoir, Margaret Salinger describes the detailed filing system her father had for his unpublished manuscripts: "A red mark meant, if I die before I finish my work, publish this 'as is,' blue meant publish but edit first, and so on." A neighbor said that Salinger told him that he had written 15 unpublished novels.

Salinger's final interview, in June 1980 with Betty Eppes of The Baton Rouge Advocate, has been represented somewhat differently, depending on the secondary source. By one account, Eppes was an attractive young woman who misrepresented herself as an aspiring novelist, and managed to record audio of the interview as well as take several photographs of Salinger, both without his knowledge or consent. In a separate account, emphasis is placed on her contact by letter writing from the local post office, and Salinger's personal initiative to cross the bridge to meet Eppes, who during the interview made clear she was a reporter and did, at the close, take pictures of Salinger as he departed. According to the first account, the interview ended "disastrously" when a passerby from Cornish attempted to shake Salinger's hand, at which point Salinger became enraged. A further account of the interview published in The Paris Review, purportedly by Eppes, has been disowned by her and separately characterized as a derived work of Review editor George Plimpton. In an interview published in August 2021, Eppes said that she recorded her conversation with Salinger without his knowledge, but that she was plagued by guilt over it. She said that she had turned down several lucrative offers for the tape, the only known recording of Salinger's voice, and that she had changed her will to stipulate that it be placed along with her body in the crematorium.

Salinger was romantically involved with television actress Elaine Joyce for several years in the 1980s. The relationship ended when he met Colleen O'Neill, a nurse and quiltmaker, whom he married around 1988. O'Neill, 40 years his junior, once told Margaret Salinger that she and Salinger were trying to have a child. They did not succeed.

== Legal conflicts ==
Although Salinger tried to escape public exposure as much as possible, he struggled with unwanted attention from the media and the public. Readers of his work and students from nearby Dartmouth College often came to Cornish in groups, hoping to catch a glimpse of him. In May 1986 Salinger learned that the British writer Ian Hamilton intended to publish a biography that made extensive use of letters Salinger had written to other authors and friends. Salinger sued to stop the book's publication and in Salinger v. Random House, the court ruled that Hamilton's extensive use of the letters, including quotation and paraphrasing, was not acceptable since the author's right to control publication overrode the right of fair use. Hamilton published In Search of J.D. Salinger: A Writing Life (1935–65) about his experience in tracking down information and the copyright fights over the planned biography.

An unintended consequence of the lawsuit was that many details of Salinger's private life, including that he had spent the last 20 years writing, in his words, "Just a work of fiction ... That's all" became public in the form of court transcripts. Excerpts from his letters were also widely disseminated, most notably a bitter remark written in response to Oona O'Neill's marriage to Charlie Chaplin:

I can see them at home evenings. Chaplin squatting grey and nude, atop his chiffonier, swinging his thyroid around his head by his bamboo cane, like a dead rat. Oona in an aquamarine gown, applauding madly from the bathroom.

In 1995, Iranian director Dariush Mehrjui released the film Pari, an unauthorized loose adaptation of Franny and Zooey. The film could be distributed legally in Iran since it has no copyright relations with the United States, but Salinger had his lawyers block a planned 1998 screening of it at Lincoln Center. Mehrjui called Salinger's action "bewildering", explaining that he saw his film as "a kind of cultural exchange".

In 1996, Salinger gave a small publisher, Orchises Press, permission to publish "Hapworth 16, 1924". It was to be published that year and listings for it appeared at Amazon.com and other booksellers. After a flurry of articles and critical reviews of the story appeared in the press, the publication date was repeatedly delayed before apparently being canceled altogether. Amazon anticipated that Orchises would publish the story in 2009, but at the time of Salinger's death, it was still listed as "unavailable".

In June 2009, Salinger consulted lawyers about the forthcoming U.S. publication of an unauthorized sequel to The Catcher in the Rye, 60 Years Later: Coming Through the Rye, by Swedish book publisher Fredrik Colting under the pseudonym J. D. California. The book appears to continue the story of Holden Caulfield. In Salinger's novel, Caulfield is 16, wandering the streets of New York after being expelled from private school; the California book features a 76-year-old man, "Mr. C", musing on having escaped his nursing home. Salinger's New York literary agent Phyllis Westberg told Britain's Sunday Telegraph, "The matter has been turned over to a lawyer". The fact that little was known about Colting and that the book was set to be published by a new publishing imprint, Windupbird Publishing, gave rise to speculation in literary circles that the whole thing might be a hoax. District court judge Deborah Batts issued an injunction that prevented the book from being published in the U.S. Colting filed an appeal on July 23, 2009; it was heard in the Second Circuit Court of Appeals on September 3, 2009. The case was settled in 2011 when Colting agreed not to publish or otherwise distribute the book, e-book, or any other editions of 60 Years Later in the U.S. or Canada until The Catcher in the Rye enters the public domain, and to refrain from using the title Coming through the Rye, dedicating the book to Salinger, or referring to The Catcher in the Rye. Colting remains free to sell the book in the rest of the world.

== Later publicity ==
Margaret Salinger's memoir Dream Catcher; its cover features a rare photograph of her as a child with her father.

On October 23, 1992, The New York Times reported, "Not even a fire that consumed at least half his home on Tuesday could smoke out the reclusive J. D. Salinger, author of the classic novel of adolescent rebellion, The Catcher in the Rye. Mr. Salinger is almost equally famous for having elevated privacy to an art form."

In 1999, 25 years after the end of their relationship, Maynard auctioned a series of letters Salinger had written her. Her memoir At Home in the World was published the same year. The book describes how Maynard's mother had consulted with her on how to appeal to Salinger by dressing in a childlike manner, and describes Maynard's relationship with him at length. In the ensuing controversy over the memoir and the letters, Maynard claimed that she was forced to auction the letters for financial reasons; she would have preferred to donate them to the Beinecke Library at Yale. Software developer Peter Norton bought the letters for $156,500 and announced that he would return them to Salinger.

A year later, Margaret Salinger published Dream Catcher: A Memoir. In it, she describes the harrowing control Salinger had over her mother and dispelled many of the Salinger myths established by Hamilton's book. One of Hamilton's arguments was that Salinger's experience with post-traumatic stress disorder left him psychologically scarred. Margaret Salinger allowed that "the few men who lived through Bloody Mortain", a battle in which her father fought, "were left with much to sicken them, body and soul", but she also painted her father as a man immensely proud of his service record, maintaining his military haircut and service jacket, and moving about his compound (and town) in an old Jeep.

Both Margaret Salinger and Maynard characterized Salinger as a film buff. According to Margaret, his favorite movies included Gigi (1958), The Lady Vanishes (1938), The 39 Steps (1935; Phoebe's favorite movie in The Catcher in the Rye), and the comedies of W. C. Fields, Laurel and Hardy, and the Marx Brothers. Predating VCRs, Salinger had an extensive collection of classic movies from the 1940s in 16 mm prints. Maynard wrote that "he loves movies, not films", and Margaret Salinger argued that her father's "worldview is, essentially, a product of the movies of his day. To my father, all Spanish speakers are Puerto Rican washerwomen, or the toothless, grinning-gypsy types in a Marx Brothers movie." Lillian Ross, a staff writer for The New Yorker and longtime friend of Salinger's, wrote after his death, "Salinger loved movies, and he was more fun than anyone to discuss them with. He enjoyed watching actors work, and he enjoyed knowing them. (He loved Anne Bancroft, hated Audrey Hepburn, and said that he had seen Grand Illusion ten times.)"

Margaret also offered many insights into other Salinger myths, including her father's supposed longtime interest in macrobiotics and involvement with alternative medicine and Eastern philosophies. A few weeks after Dream Catcher was published, Margaret's brother, Matt, discredited the memoir in a letter to The New York Observer. He disparaged his sister's "gothic tales of our supposed childhood" and wrote, "I can't say with any authority that she is consciously making anything up. I just know that I grew up in a very different house, with two very different parents from those my sister describes."

== Death ==
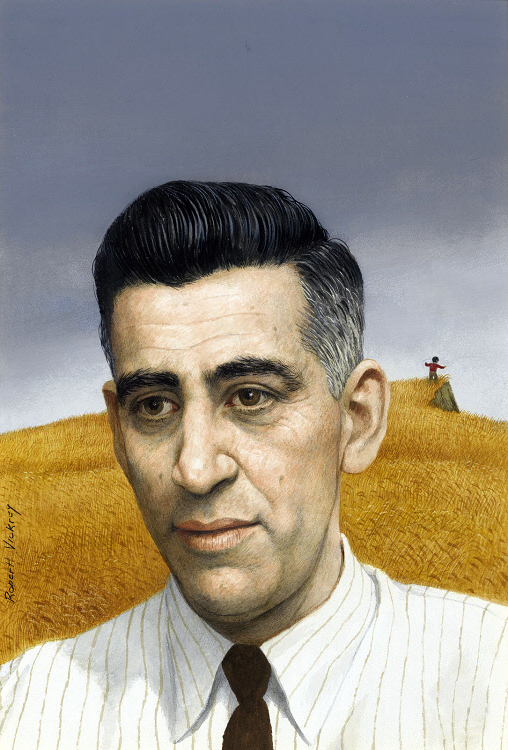
Created for the cover of Time magazine, Robert Vickrey's 1961 portrait of Salinger was placed on view in the National Portrait Gallery in Washington, D.C., after Salinger's death.

On January 27, 2010, Salinger died of natural causes at his home in Cornish, New Hampshire, aged 91. His literary representative told The New York Times that Salinger had broken his hip in May 2009, but that "his health had been excellent until a rather sudden decline after the new year." His third wife and widow, Colleen O'Neill Zakrzeski Salinger, and his son Matt became the executors of Salinger's estate.

== Posthumous publications ==
Salinger wrote all his life. His widow and son began preparing this work for publication after his death, announcing in 2019 that "all of what he wrote will at some point be shared" but that it was a major undertaking and not yet ready. In 2023, his son estimated that he would finish transcribing Salinger's notes in "a year or two" and reiterated that "all the unpublished material will be published, but it is a complicated task." The transcription of Salinger's notes was still underway in 2026, when his son said the process was "very close" to completion.

== Literary style and themes ==
In a contributor's note Salinger gave to Harper's Magazine in 1946, he wrote, "I almost always write about very young people", a statement that has been called his credo. Adolescents are featured or appear in all of Salinger's work, from his first published story, "The Young Folks" (1940), to The Catcher in the Rye and his Glass family stories. In 1961, the critic Alfred Kazin explained that Salinger's choice of teenagers as a subject matter was one reason for his appeal to young readers, but another reason was "a consciousness [among youths] that he speaks for them and virtually to them, in a language that is peculiarly honest and their own, with a vision of things that capture their most secret judgments of the world." For this reason, Norman Mailer once called Salinger "the greatest mind ever to stay in prep school." Salinger's language, especially his energetic, realistically sparse dialogue, was revolutionary at the time his first stories were published and was seen by several critics as "the most distinguishing thing" about his work.

Salinger identified closely with his characters, and used techniques such as interior monologue, letters, and extended telephone calls to display his gift for dialogue.

Recurring themes in Salinger's stories also connect to the ideas of innocence and adolescence, including the "corrupting influence of Hollywood and the world at large", the disconnect between teenagers and "phony" adults, and the perceptive, precocious intelligence of children.

Contemporary critics discuss a clear progression over the course of Salinger's published work, as evidenced by the increasingly negative reviews each of his three post-Catcher story collections received. Hamilton adheres to this view, arguing that while Salinger's early stories for the "slicks" boasted "tight, energetic" dialogue, they had also been formulaic and sentimental. It took the standards of The New Yorker editors, among them William Shawn, to refine his writing into the "spare, teasingly mysterious, withheld" qualities of "A Perfect Day for Bananafish" (1948), The Catcher in the Rye, and his stories of the early 1950s. By the late 1950s, as Salinger became more reclusive and involved in religious study, Hamilton notes that his stories became longer, less plot-driven, and increasingly filled with digression and parenthetical remarks. Louis Menand agrees, writing in The New Yorker that Salinger "stopped writing stories, in the conventional sense ... He seemed to lose interest in fiction as an art form—perhaps he thought there was something manipulative or inauthentic about literary device and authorial control." In recent years, some critics have defended certain post-Nine Stories works by Salinger; in 2001, Janet Malcolm wrote in The New York Review of Books that "Zooey" "is arguably Salinger's masterpiece ... Rereading it and its companion piece 'Franny' is no less rewarding than rereading The Great Gatsby."

== Influence ==
Salinger's writing has influenced several prominent writers, prompting Harold Brodkey (an O. Henry Award-winning author) to say in 1991, "His is the most influential body of work in English prose by anyone since Hemingway." Of the writers in Salinger's generation, Pulitzer Prize-winning novelist John Updike, attested that "the short stories of J. D. Salinger really opened my eyes as to how you can weave fiction out of a set of events that seem almost unconnected, or very lightly connected ... [Reading Salinger] stick[s] in my mind as really having moved me a step up, as it were, toward knowing how to handle my own material." Menand has observed that the early stories of Pulitzer Prize-winner Philip Roth were affected by "Salinger's voice and comic timing".

National Book Award finalist Richard Yates told The New York Times in 1977 that reading Salinger's stories for the first time was a landmark experience, and that "nothing quite like it has happened to me since". Yates called Salinger "a man who used language as if it were pure energy beautifully controlled, and who knew exactly what he was doing in every silence as well as in every word." Gordon Lish's O. Henry Award-winning short story "For Jeromé—With Love and Kisses" (1977, collected in What I Know So Far, 1984) is a play on Salinger's "For Esmé—with Love and Squalor".

In 2001, Menand wrote in The New Yorker that "Catcher in the Rye rewrites" among each new generation had become "a literary genre all its own". He classed among them Sylvia Plath's The Bell Jar (1963), Hunter S. Thompson's Fear and Loathing in Las Vegas (1971), Jay McInerney's Bright Lights, Big City (1984), and Dave Eggers's A Heartbreaking Work of Staggering Genius (2000). Writer Aimee Bender was struggling with her first short stories when a friend gave her a copy of Nine Stories; inspired, she later described Salinger's effect on writers, saying, "it feels like Salinger wrote The Catcher in the Rye in a day, and that incredible feeling of ease inspires writing. Inspires the pursuit of voice. Not his voice. My voice. Your voice." Authors such as Stephen Chbosky, Jonathan Safran Foer, Carl Hiaasen, Susan Minot, Haruki Murakami, Gwendoline Riley, Tom Robbins, Louis Sachar, Joel Stein, Leonardo Padura, and John Green have cited Salinger as an influence. Musician Tomas Kalnoky of Streetlight Manifesto also cites Salinger as an influence, referencing him and Holden Caulfield in the song "Here's to Life". Biographer Paul Alexander called Salinger "the Greta Garbo of literature".

== List of works ==
=== Books ===
- The Catcher in the Rye (1951)
- Nine Stories (1953)
  - "A Perfect Day for Bananafish" (1948)
  - "Uncle Wiggily in Connecticut" (1948)
  - "Just Before the War with the Eskimos" (1948)
  - "The Laughing Man" (1949)
  - "Down at the Dinghy" (1949)
  - "For Esmé—with Love and Squalor" (1950)
  - "Pretty Mouth and Green My Eyes" (1951)
  - "De Daumier-Smith's Blue Period" (1952)
  - "Teddy" (1953)
- Franny and Zooey (1961), reworked from "Ivanoff, the Terrible" (1956)
  - "Franny" (1955)
  - "Zooey" (1957)
- Raise High the Roof Beam, Carpenters and Seymour: An Introduction (1963)
  - "Raise High the Roof-Beam, Carpenters" (1955)
  - "Seymour: An Introduction" (1959)

=== Collected short stories ===
- Three Early Stories (2014)
  - "The Young Folks" (1940)
  - "Go See Eddie" (1940)
  - "Once a Week Won't Kill You" (1944)
- The Complete Uncollected Short Stories of J. D. Salinger, Vol. 1 & 2 (1974) (Unauthorized Pirated (Bootleg) edition)

=== Published stories (uncollected) ===
- "The Hang of It" (1941, republished in The Kit Book for Soldiers, Sailors and Marines, 1943)
- "The Heart of a Broken Story" (1941)
- "Personal Notes of an Infantryman" (1942)
- "The Long Debut of Lois Taggett" (1942, republished in Stories: The Fiction of the Forties, ed. Whit Burnett, 1949)
- "The Varioni Brothers" (1943)
- "Both Parties Concerned" (1944)
- "Soft-Boiled Sergeant" (1944)
- "Last Day of the Last Furlough" (1944)
- "Elaine" (1945)
- "The Stranger" (1945)
- "I'm Crazy" (1945)
- "A Boy in France" (1945, republished in Post Stories 1942–45, ed. Ben Hibbs, 1946 and July/August 2010 issue of Saturday Evening Post magazine), reworked from "What Babe Saw, or Ooh-La-La!" (1944)
- "This Sandwich Has No Mayonnaise" (1945, republished in The Armchair Esquire, ed. L. Rust Hills, 1959)
- "Slight Rebellion off Madison" (1946, republished in Wonderful Town: New York Stories from The New Yorker, ed. David Remnick, 2000)
- "A Young Girl in 1941 with No Waist at All" (1947)
- "The Inverted Forest" (1947)
- "Blue Melody" (1948)
- "A Girl I Knew" (1948, republished in Best American Short Stories 1949, ed. Martha Foley, 1949)
- "Hapworth 16, 1924" (1965)

=== Unpublished stories ===
- "The Survivors" (1939)
- "The Long Hotel Story" (1940)
- "The Fishermen" (1941)
- "Lunch for Three" (1941)
- "I Went to School with Adolf Hitler" (1941)
- "Monologue for a Watery Highball" (1941)
- "The Lovely Dead Girl at Table Six" (1941)
- "Mrs. Hincher" (1942), also known as "Paula"
- "The Kissless Life of Reilly" (1942)
- "The Last and Best of the Peter Pans" (1942)
- "Holden On the Bus" (1942)
- "Men Without Hemingway" (1942)
- "Over the Sea Let’s Go, Twentieth Century Fox" (1942)
- "The Broken Children" (1943)
- "Paris" (1943)
- "Rex Passard on the Planet Mars" (1943)
- "Bitsey" (1943)
- "What Got into Curtis in the Woodshed" (1944)
- "The Children's Echelon" (1944), also known as "Total War Diary"
- "Boy Standing in Tennessee" (1944)
- "The Magic Foxhole" (1944)
- "Two Lonely Men" (1944)
- "A Young Man in a Stuffed Shirt" (1944)
- "The Daughter of the Late, Great Man" (1945)
- "The Ocean Full of Bowling Balls" (1947)
- "Birthday Boy" (1946), also known as "The Male Goodbye"
- "The Boy in the People Shooting Hat" (1948)
- "A Summer Accident" (1949)
- "Requiem for the Phantom of the Opera" (1950)

== Media portrayals and references ==
- In W. P. Kinsella's 1982 novel, Shoeless Joe, the main character "kidnaps" the reclusive Salinger to take him to a baseball game. When the novel was adapted for cinema as Field of Dreams, Salinger's character was replaced by the fictional Terence Mann (played by James Earl Jones), amid fears that Salinger might sue.
- Sean Connery claimed that Salinger was the inspiration for his role as William Forrester in the 2000 film Finding Forrester.
- Salinger's name is mentioned in the title for The Wonder Years song "You're Not Salinger. Get Over It."
- Salinger is a 2013 documentary film that tells the story of Salinger's life through interviews with friends, historians, and journalists.
- In the book and TV show You by Caroline Kepnes, one of the characters, Peach, is named as being a relative of Salinger.
- Salinger is portrayed by Chris Cooper in James Steven Sadwith's 2015 film Coming Through the Rye.
- Salinger appears as a character (voiced by Alan Arkin) in several 2015–2016 episodes of BoJack Horseman (season 2 episodes 6, 7, 8, 10 and season 3 episode 1), where he is said to have faked his own death to escape public attention and ironically pursue a career in television production. He quotes numerous lines from his works, bemoaning how The Catcher in the Rye has become his only recognizable work. In humorous contrast to his real-life beliefs, this rendition of Salinger loves Hollywood and ends up managing a game show, which he aptly names Hollywoo Stars and Celebrities: What Do They Know? Do They Know Things? Let's Find Out.
- Salinger was portrayed by Nicholas Hoult in the 2017 film Rebel in the Rye.
- My Salinger Year is a film directed by Philippe Falardeau released in 2021, based on the 2014 memoir by Joanna Rakoff.
- Sergeant Salinger is a novel by the writer Jerome Charyn, published in 2021 (Bellevue Literary Press), in which the author imagines a fictionalized biography of the young soldier J. D. Salinger in Europe during World War II.
