= The Last and Best of the Peter Pans =

- Short story by J. D. Salinger
- Country: United States
- Language: English

Publication
- Published in: Unpublished

"The Last and Best of the Peter Pans" is an unpublished short story by J. D. Salinger.

== Plot ==
The story centers on a conversation between Vincent Caulfield and his mother. His mother, an actress named Mary Moriarty, has hidden his draft survey. He finds it in the utensil drawer, and becomes angry at her for hiding it. As the conversation goes on, it is apparent his mother is just looking after his best interests. Her other son, Kenneth, was killed in the war and she wants to prevent this from happening again. Another sibling, a teenage boy named Holden, is mentioned. Vincent references his baseball mitt that is covered in poetry, similar to that of Allie in The Catcher in the Rye. At the close of the story, Vincent understands his mother's concern, but feels sorry for her solicitous behavior, and expresses depression over the fact she worries so much, particularly over kids who are about to fall off a cliff.

== Theme ==
Biographer Kenneth Slawenski provides the key thematic element in “The Last and Best of the Peter Pans”:

The story is an intensely personal work that examines what was arguably Salinger’s closest relationship: that with his mother. “The Last of the Peter Pans” remains the deepest insight into the character of Miriam Salinger, her protective bond with her son, and his conflicted feelings regarding it.

Slawenski adds that in subsequent stories that feature Vincent Caulfield, Salinger casts him “as a symbol of emotional reticence, entrapped by his pain.”

The title is a reference to the children's story Peter Pan by the author J. M. Barrie published in 1904. Peter Pan, a boy who is eternally youthful, leads a group of “lost boys” stranded on an enchanted isle to a number of exciting adventures.

Vincent lashes out against his mother's concealment of his draft notice. She reminds him that his brother, Kenneth, has been killed overseas, and that she is loath to suffer the loss of another. Upon reflection, Vincent dubs her “the last and best of the Peter Pans,” praising his mother's determination to preserve the life and happiness of her remaining children.

== Archival history ==
The story—as with many of Salinger's unpublished works—is shrouded in mystery. A typed, 12 page manuscript is available to patrons at Princeton University's Firestone Library. This is part of the library's Story archives. Although Salinger donated the manuscript (with at least three other unpublished stories and various correspondence to and from Story's editor, Whit Burnett) to the library, access is tightly restricted. It is one of the few items in the series that is not permitted to be photocopied. Moreover, the piece became a topic amidst a biographer's attempt to use contents of Salinger's letters. At least one letter, available at the library, briefly mentions the piece and Salinger's subsequent unwavering decision to withdraw the powerful story from publication and refusal to discuss the reasoning (it was accepted at Story in 1942 after being rejected by The New Yorker the same year). Salinger's estate as well as his literary agency, Harold Ober Associates, have stipulated the work will not be published until 2051, per his explicit wishes. In September 2013 it was reported that, along with a series of other works by Salinger, the story would be published between 2015 and 2020, although it has yet to be published.

== Sources ==
- Slawenski, Kenneth. 2010. J. D. Salinger: A Life. Random House, New York. ISBN 978-1-4000-6951-4
