= Uncle Wiggily in Connecticut =

Short story by J. D. Salinger

"Uncle Wiggily in Connecticut" is a short story by J. D. Salinger that appears in his collection Nine Stories. It was originally published in the March 20, 1948 issue of The New Yorker.

The main character, Eloise, struggles to come to terms with the life she has created for herself with her husband Lew. Her true love is the late Walt, who died during his service in the army.

The story's title refers to an event recalled by Eloise in which she and Walt were running to catch a bus, and she sprained her ankle. Walt then said, referring to her ankle in good humor, "Poor Uncle Wiggily...".

The 1949 film My Foolish Heart, based on this story, remains the only authorized adaptation of Salinger's writings into film. Except for a framing story, the picture bears little resemblance to the original.

Although Walt's surname and background are not discussed in the story, Salinger would later reveal that Walt is a member of the Glass family and brother of Seymour Glass, the protagonist of Salinger's previous story "A Perfect Day for Bananafish". Later works by Salinger would elaborate upon the character of Walt Glass from the perspectives of his siblings.

== Plot summary ==
The story unfolds on a snowy day at the upscale Wengler home; all the characters who appear in the scene are female.

Eloise Wengler is a jaded suburban housewife in an unhappy marriage to Lew Wengler. Mary Jane is her former college roommate who works part-time as a secretary. She is divorced. Neither woman graduated from the college they attended together. Ramona is Eloise’s little daughter. Socially inept, withdrawn and bespectacled, she is accompanied everywhere by her imaginary friend, Jimmy Jimmereeno. Grace is the Wenglers' African-American maid.

Mary Jane visits Eloise at her home and they spend the afternoon reminiscing about their college years, chain-smoking, and drinking themselves into a stupor. Ramona returns home, and Mary Jane gushes over the girl. Eloise commands her daughter to divulge the particulars of Jimmy Jimmereeno to the guest, and Mary Jane declares the make-believe boy “marvelous.” Ramona retreats outdoors to play.

The women resume their drunken and desultory ramblings. Eloise relates the story of a young soldier, Walt Glass, with whom she fell in love when single. She still clings to Walt's memory (he was killed in a freak accident while serving in the Pacific), and expresses bitter regret that she married Lew. Eloise embarks on a tirade against men, and Lew in particular, who lacks, she feels, the traits most lovable in Walt – “humor” and “intelligence”. She relates an event in which she and Walt were running to catch a bus, and she sprained her ankle. Referring to her ankle in good humor, Walt had said, "Poor Uncle Wiggily…” In divulging the details of Walt’s death, Eloise breaks down, and Mary Jane attempts to comfort her.

Ramona reenters the room and having overheard her mother’s remarks, announces that Jimmy has been run over by a car and killed.

The women continue drinking until they fall asleep in the living room. After dark, Eloise is woken by a phone call from her husband Lew, and after a short, sarcastic exchange, hangs up on him.

Grace, the live-in maid, approaches Eloise and respectfully asks that her visiting spouse be allowed to stay the night due to the severe weather. Eloise curtly rebuffs her employee and denies the request.

The drunken Eloise goes upstairs to Ramona’s bedroom where the child is sleeping. Turning on the light, she sees the girl lying at the extreme edge of the bed, a habit of hers to make space for her imaginary friend. Eloise wakes her up and reminds her that Jimmy has been killed, but Ramona told her she was trying to avoid hurting a new imaginary friend named "Mickey Mickeranno." Flying into a rage, the exasperated Eloise takes hold of Ramona and drags her to the middle of the bed, and orders her to go to sleep in that position.

After switching off the light and standing long in the doorway Eloise holds Ramona's glasses against her cheek, cries and repeats the words “Poor Uncle Wiggily” again and again. Sobbing, she tucks in the frightened and crying girl and leaves the room. Downstairs, she awakens Mary Jane from her alcohol-induced slumber, and weeping, beseeches her dismayed friend to reassure her that as a freshman in college, she had been “a nice girl”.

== Analysis ==
Written while Salinger resided in suburban Stamford, Connecticut, the story offers insights into upper-middle class American society in the post-WWII years. In that era, writes biographer Kenneth Slawenski, “unabashed Americanism and materialism were unquestioned values”. Despising his neighbors for esteeming conformity and phoniness, Salinger sought to expose “the false illusions of the suburban dream.”

Despite her escapism through alcohol, the cynical Eloise comes face-to-face with her own “phoniness”. She recognizes that both she and Ramona are seeking companions that don’t exist - Walt Glass and Jimmy Jimmereeno - and is finally able to feel pity for her child’s suffering. Salinger shows the unreality of Eloise’s situation, which has left her bereft of her former sincerity and genuineness.

== 1949 film adaptation ==
Shortly after The New Yorker published "Uncle Wiggily" in March 1948, Salinger sold the movie rights to Samuel Goldwyn. The sale promised to advance Salinger’s career, and was financially lucrative.

With its dialog-driven plot, "Uncle Wiggily" was more appropriate for a stage adaptation, and the story would require a major rewrite by the movie studio to achieve a film version. Salinger had relinquished all control over the screenplay, which was written by Julius and Philip Epstein.

In the process of making a Hollywood film version, the story was transformed from “an exposé of the suburban society” into a sentimental love story with a happy ending.

Salinger was profoundly dissatisfied by the results, and to his dismay, My Foolish Heart received two Academy Award nominations—Best Actress Susan Hayward and Best Music (Song)--and did well at the box office. As a result, the author refused to allow any mainstream film studio the rights to adapt his works to the screen.

== Sources ==
- Sallinger, Jerome D. 1948. Uncle Wiggily in Connecticut in Nine Stories. Little, Brown and Company. New York (1981).
- Slawenski, Kenneth. 2010. J.D. Salinger: A Life. Random House, New York. ISBN 978-1-4000-6951-4
