= This Sandwich Has No Mayonnaise =

- Short story by J. D. Salinger
- Country: United States
- Language: English

Publication
- Published in: Esquire
- Publication date: October 1945

"This Sandwich Has No Mayonnaise" is an uncollected work of short fiction by J. D. Salinger which appeared in the October 1945 issue of Esquire. The story was published in the 1958 anthology The Armchair Esquire, edited by Arnold Gingrich and L. Rust Hills.

"This Sandwich Has No Mayonnaise" is the seventh of Salinger's nine works dealing with members of the Caulfield family.

== Plot ==
The story describes Vincent Caulfield's experience at a Georgia boot camp before embarking for the war. He is upset because his brother Holden (as described in "Last Day of the Last Furlough") is missing in action, and is unable to accept the possibility Holden may be dead.

== Background ==
Though none of Salinger's correspondence reveals the precise evolution of the story, "This Sandwich Has No Mayonnaise" was completed in late 1944 when Salinger was serving with US Army units fighting the Schnee Eifel and Hürtgen Forest. Biographer Kenneth Slawenski speculates on how this reality may have affected Salinger's handling of the story:

Grappling to deal with death, Salinger casts himself as Vincent Caulfield, who, mirroring his creator, remained torn between repressing his feelings and admitting the reality in which he was embroiled.

== Theme ==
In "This Sandwich Has No Mayonnaise," Salinger uses a present-tense internal monologue to examine the anguished speculation of an older brother, Vincent, obsessing over his beloved younger brother Holden, who is reported missing-in-action while serving in combat during World War II. Salinger develops a narrative "completely within Vincent's tortured mind." His distracted worry borders on panic and paranoia:

Missing, missing, missing. Lies! I'm being lied to. He's never been missing before. He's one of the least missing boys in the world. He's here in this truck; he's home in New York; he's at the Pentey Preparatory School ('You sent us the Boy, We'll mold the Man - all modern fireproof buildings...'); yes, he's at Pentey, he never left school...Missing! Is that missing? Why lie about something as important as that?

In "one of the more remarkable passages in Salinger's work," Vincent indulges in an idealized recollection of Holden and his siblings, Red and Phoebe, which resembles the protagonists in The Catcher in the Rye (1951):

Red said to me, It won't hurt you to see the [World's] Fair either. It's very pretty. So I grabbed Phoebe, and she had some kid with her named Minerva (which killed me), and I put them both in the car and then I looked around for Holden. I couldn't find him; so Phoebe and Minerva and I left without him...at the Fair we went to the Bell Telephone Exhibit, and I told Phoebe that This Phone was connected with the author of the Elsie Fairfield books. So Phoebe, shaking like Phoebe, picked up the phone, picked up the phone and trembles into it, Hello, this is Phoebe Caulfield, as a child at the World's Fair. I read your books and think they are excellent in spots. My mother and father are playing in Death Takes a Holiday in Great Neck. We go swimming a lot, but the ocean is better in Cape Code. Good bye!...And then we came out of the building and there was Holden, with Hart and Kirky Morris. He had my terry-cloth shirt on. No coat. He came over and asked Phoebe for her autograph and she socked him in the stomach, happy to see him, happy to see her brother. Then he said to me, Let's get out of this educational junk. Let's go on one of the rides or something. I can't stand this stuff...And now they're trying to tell me he's missing. Missing. Who's missing? Not him. He's at the World's Fair.

"This Sandwich Has No Mayonnaise" is evidence of Salinger's early interest in themes concerning the reconstruction of an idealized past, as in the Glass family stories.

== Sources ==
- Slawenski, Kenneth. 2010. J. D. Salinger: A Life. Random House, New York. ISBN 978-1-4000-6951-4
- Wenke, John. 1991. J. D. Salinger: A Study of the Short Fiction. Twaynes Studies in Short Fiction, Gordon Weaver, General Editor. Twayne Publishers, New York. ISBN 0-8057-8334-2
