= Two Lonely Men =

- Short story by J. D. Salinger
- Country: United States
- Language: English

Publication
- Published in: Unpublished

"Two Lonely Men" is an unpublished short story by J. D. Salinger.

== Plot ==
The story is told from the point of view of a narrator who is a professional short story writer now working as a Morse Code Instructor. The setting is an Army base in Georgia, where the narrator details the developing friendship of two officers. One, a Captain, has a wife who visits and subsequently describes an affair she had while he was stationed. At the close of the story, the Captain approaches the narrator and tells him he has requested a transfer, because he now does not like the other officer.

== History ==
The story was written in 1944, while Salinger was stationed at Bainbridge Air Base, Georgia. A 27-page, dated manuscript is available at Princeton University's Firestone Library, part of the library's Story magazine archives. Copies of the story are not permitted.

== Sources ==
- Slawenski, Kenneth. 2010. J. D. Salinger: A Life. Random House, New York. ISBN 978-1-4000-6951-4
