= Three Early Stories =

Posthumous short story collection by J. D. Salinger

- Author: J. D. Salinger
- Language: English
- Genre: Short stories
- Publisher: The Devault-Graves Agency
- Publication date: 2014
- Publication place: United States
- Media type: Print
- ISBN: 978-0989671460

Three Early Stories is a posthumous short story collection by American writer J. D. Salinger, published in 2014 by The Devault-Graves Agency. The book includes three stories: "The Young Folks", "Go See Eddie" and "Once a Week Won't Kill You".

As the title indicates, the stories included in the book are among the first Salinger ever published, dating back as early as 1940. However, they had not previously been collected in book form. Two of the stories, "The Young Folks" and "Once a Week Won't Kill You", were originally published in Story magazine, while "Go See Eddie" was originally published in The University of Kansas Review (now known as New Letters).

The collection also includes new illustrations, created by Anna Rose Yoken, to accompany the stories.

== History ==
In 2014, The Devault-Graves Agency, a Memphis-based independent publisher co-founded by writer Tom Graves, made world literary news by announcing the publication of the first "legally sound" book by Salinger in over 50 years. The book collects the first two short stories ever published by Salinger, "The Young Folks" and "Go See Eddie", and a later one, Once a Week Won't Kill You", published during his World War II period. The agency discovered that those three stories had never been registered to Salinger, unbeknownst to the Salinger estate according to some reports. However, The Devault-Graves Agency applied for and received a copyright for the book as a unique anthology, thus preventing other publishers from publishing the three stories collectively.

Three Early Stories was also published in six foreign-language editions. The Devault-Graves Agency brought suit against the Salinger Trust for what it considered interference with its foreign marketing of the book. The agency dropped the lawsuit when it believed that the Salinger Trust would no longer interfere with the book’s marketing in those countries where the copyright of Three Early Stories was upheld. The agency also claimed it would not try to market the book in countries where the Salinger Trust still held copyright to the three stories in question. The copyright issues involved in the case have caused it to become an important case in the area of international copyright law.

== "The Young Folks" ==
"The Young Folks" was Salinger's first published work, written in 1939 and given to Whit Burnett, later appearing in the March/April 1940 issue of Story magazine. It takes place at a New York cocktail party and details the emptiness of the conversation between a young woman and a male college student.

== "Go See Eddie" ==
First published in 1940, "Go See Eddie" is one of J. D. Salinger's first short stories. Initially submitted to Story magazine and then to Esquire before being accepted by The University of Kansas City Review, now known as New Letters, this short story was forgotten for decades, before being uncovered in 1963 by Salinger's biographer Warren French. This story was republished in Fiction: Form & Experience (1969) and it is now in the public domain.

The story centers on two siblings, Bobby and Helen, and their maid Elsie. Bobby comes to see Helen who is grooming herself. He tries to convince her of several things. The first is to pursue a job with one of his friend, Eddie, and his second motive is to convince her to not commit adultery with a married man. He complains of her promiscuity and the disagreement escalates. After a brief fight, Bobby tells Helen about a rumour that she is seeing another man as well, which she denies, and the lunch he had with the wife of the man who is committing adultery with Helen. After a last attempt at telling her to go see Eddie, Bobby leaves. Helen reflects on what has transpired and starts to rectify the situation by possibly cancelling the affair. She then calls the other guy with whom she is rumoured to have an affair.

== "Once a Week Won't Kill You" ==
Published in the November/December 1944 edition of Story, "Once a Week Won't Kill You" deals with the departure of a soldier for combat in Europe and the soldier's request that his wife spend more time with his aunt when he is gone. Salinger wrote the story in Devon, England, where he was stationed in the spring of 1944 in the lead-up to the Normandy landings.
