= Blue Melody =

1948 short story by J. D. Salinger

- Short story by J. D. Salinger
- Country: United States
- Language: English

Publication
- Published in: Cosmopolitan
- Publication date: September 1948

"Blue Melody" is an uncollected work of short fiction by J. D. Salinger which appeared in the September 1948 issue of Cosmopolitan. The story was inspired by the life of Bessie Smith and was originally titled "Needle on a Scratchy Phonograph Record". Cosmopolitan changed the title to "Blue Melody" without Salinger's consent, a "slick" magazine tactic that was one of the reasons the author decided, in the late forties, that "he wanted to publish only in The New Yorker."

== Plot ==
The tragic tale of an African-American jazz singer, the story was inspired by the death of Bessie Smith, who died from injuries suffered in an automobile accident in near Memphis, Tennessee. Due to segregationist prohibitions, she was denied medical treatment by physicians in a hospital reserved for white patients.

== Theme ==
“Blue Melody” memorializes blues singer Bessie Smith. Though denying he intended to “slam” the American Deep South, Salinger's narrator registers a “stinging” condemnation of white-supremacism in “Blue Melody” conveyed in this cynical remark alluding to the story's theme:

It’s just a little story of Mom’s apple pie, ice-cold beer, the Brooklyn Dodgers, and the Lux Radio Theatre of the air—the things we fought for, in short. You can’t miss it, really.

Kenneth Slawenski draws a thematic equivalence between Salinger's “A Girl I Knew” (1948) and “Blue Melody" in their exposure of “dehumanizing values in society around him” that he believed led to the extermination of European Jews and the apartheid-like system in the United States. As such, Salinger “brought The Holocaust home.”

== Sources ==
- Slawenski, Kenneth. 2010. J. D. Salinger: A Life. Random House, New York. ISBN 978-1-4000-6951-4
- Wenke, John. 1991. J. D. Salinger: A Study of the Short Fiction. Twaynes Studies in Short Fiction, Gordon Weaver, General Editor. Twayne Publishers, New York. ISBN 0-8057-8334-2
