= Mrs. Hincher =

- Short story by J. D. Salinger
- Country: United States
- Language: English
- Genre: Ghost story

Publication
- Published in: Unpublished

"Mrs. Hincher" is an unpublished short story by J. D. Salinger.

== Plot ==
The story centers on a married couple, Frank and Paula Hincher, who are struggling to have a child. Mrs. Hincher convinces herself she is pregnant, and claims she needs bedrest. While her doctors tell her otherwise, she determines she will have a child, and sets up a nursery. Her husband finds her staying in bed and soon locking herself in the room. Weeks go by until a young girl is allowed in and reports there is a little baby in there but it won't talk. Overcome with frustration, Mr. Hincher breaks in the bedroom to find Mrs. Hincher curled in the fetal position in a crib. They decide to go on a vacation to Florida, where Mr Hincher subsequently has a mental breakdown in the lobby of the hotel and is sent to an asylum.

== History ==
Salinger completed the story in late 1941 and sold this story under the name "Paula" to Stag in 1942 but the magazine decided not to publish the dark tale, referenced by himself as his only documented attempt at the horror genre. Salinger's agency was contacted by editors requesting he write a novel, but he was in the army by this time, and could not. In one letter he refers to this story as his only "horror" story. The story is essentially a set of fragments, and is available, as are letters referencing the piece, for a fee and required registration at the Harry Ransom Center at the University of Texas, as well as archives accessible only by his literary agency.
