= Once a Week Won't Kill You =

"Once a Week Won’t Kill You"
- Short story by J. D. Salinger
- Country: United States
- Language: English

Publication
- Published in: Story
- Publication date: November–December, 1944

"Once a Week Won’t Kill You" is a work of short fiction by J. D. Salinger published in the November–December 1944 issue of Story. The story is included in the 2014 Salinger collection Three Early Stories.

== Plot ==
The story concerns a young American soldier who is about to deploy overseas during World War II and his concern for his elderly aunt. The story begins with a man packing his bags as he was about to leave his wife to deploy. She hopes he will go to the Cavalry but he tells her everyone is being deployed to the Infantry. His wife doesn't seem to care that he is being shipped off to danger. The title of the story is from his repeated insistent request to his wife, asking her to take his elderly aunt to the movies once a week and doing so won't kill her. His wife yawns and begrudgingly agrees after trying to protest and saying that his aunt is weird. He persists relentlessly as he is worried his wife might not take his aunt to the movies after all. More and more information about the man is revealed through subtle nuance and that the aunt had raised him as her own son. He kept the knowledge of his departure until the last minute from his aunt but goes to tell her. She knew that even he would be deployed someday, so kept a letter ready, addressing a person she knew in the military, for his sake. The protagonist tearfully tears the letter later. His aunt barely leaves the house unless he takes her somewhere so he wants his wife to do the same in his absence and wants to impress upon her, the importance of doing so, by repeating the desire throughout the story. He nearly stumbles at the stairs after his brief goodbye to his aunt and the story ends with his food gone cold and him reminding his wife of her promise to take his aunt to the movies, once a week. The story is mostly dialogue. The emotional and tense setting of the story is expressed with dialogue but with conventional restrain.

== Background ==
Salinger likely began writing "Once a Week Won't Kill You" while on board the military transport vessel SS George Washington. The ship would dock in Liverpool, England on January 29, 1944. Biographer Kenneth Slawenski notes that the story "was laced with nostalgia for a world that Salinger was already beginning to miss and feared he might never see again."

Editor Whit Burnett accepted the story for publication in October 1944 while Salinger, who spoke German and French, was on the front lines embedded as a counterintelligence officer in the 12th Infantry Regiment or the 4th Infantry Division. Story magazine published the work in November when Salinger’s unit was fighting in the Hürtgen Forest. The editors at Story magazine included a brief autobiographical sketch provided at their request by Salinger.

== Theme ==
Literary critic John Wenke describes the story as an exploration "of the ruptures war visits upon individuals and families." Biographer Kenneth Slawenski discerns an ironical element associated with this particular work of short fiction:

While Salinger was enduring Hürtgen, "Once a Week Won’t Kill You" was published…The appearance of this piece, its plot trivial in comparison to his present circumstances, was tinged with irony. It must have been difficult for Salinger to recall the motivation behind the piece or even the persona who had penned it.

Slawenski adds: "Of the original 3,080 regimental soldiers who went into Hürtgen, only 563 were left. For those soldiers especially, walking out of the forest alive was a victory in itself."

== Sources ==
- Slawenski, Kenneth. 2010. J. D. Salinger: A Life. Random House, New York. ISBN 978-1-4000-6951-4
- Wenke, John. 1991. J. D. Salinger: A Study of the Short Fiction. Twaynes Studies in Short Fiction, Gordon Weaver, General Editor. Twayne Publishers, New York. ISBN 0-8057-8334-2
- https://salinger.org/story/once-a-week-wont-kill-you/
