= The Heart of a Broken Story =

- Short story by J. D. Salinger
- Country: United States
- Language: English

Publication
- Published in: Esquire
- Publication date: September, 1941

"The Heart of a Broken Story" is a short story by J. D. Salinger published in the September 1941 issue of Esquire.

== Plot ==
The third-person narrator begins the story, involving a romantic encounter between its youthful protagonists, Justin Horgenschlag and Shirley Lester. When Justin sees Shirley on a public bus, he instantly becomes infatuated with her, and begins his efforts to ask her for a date.

The omniscient narrator breaks into the narrative at this point and speaks directly to the reader: he admits that he is struggling to proceed with the story. He admits that the premise of the story is trite. The narrator further makes pejorative remarks about the literary journal in which the narrative appears, disparaging its typical literary content. After offering a number of scenarios in an effort to construct a meaningful love story, he abandons the project. The narrator relegates the would-be couple to their former anonymity, and they disembark the bus to pursue their separate lives.

== Critical Assessment ==
"The Heart of a Broken Story" marks a turning point in Salinger's approach to writing for commercial literary markets in the 1940s. Biographer Kenneth Slawnski explains:

"The story has a bleak and serious underside that displays the dilemma in which Salinger currently found himself: whether to strive for quality or salability...he made a conscious decision to separate his writing between those containing introspection and nuance and the more marketable works that could earn him a quick buck."

Literary critic John Wenke observes that the story "invalidates its own premises. Well before meta-fiction became fashionable, Salinger unmakes - that is, he deconstructs - the form of the sentimental love story..."

Wenke adds that "The Heart of a Broken Story" is a "highly sophisticated, carefully refined piece...remarkable for its surface play of comic brilliance."

== Theme ==
In "Heart of a Broken Story" Salinger takes the measure of wishful fantasy as the basis for popular entertainment and —at a remarkably early point in his career —registers his uneasiness with formula fiction. This story constitutes his earliest attack on phony art." —John Wenke in J. D. Salinger: A Study of the Short Fiction (1991)

Regarded as one of Salinger's "best early stories" by critic John Wenke, the story serves as a burlesque of the formulaic "boy-meets-girl" scenarios commonly found in issues of Collier's during the 1940s—for which Salinger had often submitted his work. Indeed, the narrative involves a young writer's struggle to reconcile the commercial demands for sentimental love stories with a more sophisticated rendering of human relationships - and fails at the endeavor. The story reveals "Salinger's concern with the place of art in a materialistic society, on the one hand, and the limits of conventional fictional form, on the other."

Salinger repeatedly refers to Collier's as a provender of romantic pabulum. The narrator, commenting on the antics of his own literary creation, named Justin Horgenschlag, remarks sarcastically: "You can't expect Collier's readers to swallow that kind of bilge."

Significantly, "The Heart of a Broken Story" was accepted for publication in Esquire—and not Collier's. John Wenke comments on the early appearance of "self-reflexivity" in the story:

Salinger anticipates the self-reflexivity associated with such post-modern practitioners as John Barth, Kurt Vonnegut, Thomas Pynchon, and Philip Roth. He also anticipates the self-reflexivity that characterizes the Glass family stories, especially "Raise High the Roof Beam, Carpenters and Seymour: An Introduction.

== Sources ==
- Shields, David and Salerno, Shane. 2013. Salinger. Simon & Schuster, New York. ISBN 978-1-4767-4483-4
- Slawenski, Kenneth. 2010. J. D. Salinger: A Life. Random House, New York. ISBN 978-1-4000-6951-4
- Wenke, John. 1991. J. D. Salinger: A Study of the Short Fiction. Twaynes Studies in Short Fiction, Gordon Weaver, General Editor. Twayne Publishers, New York. ISBN 0-8057-8334-2
