= The Inverted Forest =

- Short story by J. D. Salinger
- Country: United States
- Language: English

Publication
- Published in: Cosmopolitan
- Publication date: December 1947

"The Inverted Forest" is an uncollected work of short fiction by J. D. Salinger which appeared in the December 1947 issue of Cosmopolitan. The work was republished in Cosmopolitan's "Diamond Jubilee" issue in March 1961. The story marked the start of Salinger's focus on the poet as a distinguished creative genius, and on the impossibilities he finds when trying to adapt to society.

== Plot ==
The story opens with a diary entry from an eleven-year-old Corinne von Nordhoffen, heiress to a large orthopedic supply company. The young girl laments at the fact that, while others have offered her gifts for her birthday, the real present she wants is Raymond Ford. On the night of her birthday, she waits in vain for him to show. Her driver is directed to head to Ford's house, across town. When they arrive at the address, all they see is a closed restaurant but realize that in fact Ford lives upstairs, with his mother. Corinne talks with Ford briefly as he suddenly exits the apartment with his mother. He is carrying a large suitcase and when asked where he is going he says "I don't know ... goodbye."

At seventeen Corinne was a beautiful but naive student attending Wellesley College. After graduating she goes to Europe and meets many men. One boyfriend dies in a car accident, and Corinne moves to New York City. She gets a job after contacting an old friend from college, Robert Waner (who we learn is narrating the story). Waner sets her up as an editor at a magazine. He proposes to her and she rejects him. After some months of working for him, Waner introduces her to the work of a poet (specifically a book of poems called The Cowardly Morning) whose works are "Coleridge and Blake and Rilke all in one, and more." The first poem is the title poem. Corinne reads it again and begins to appreciate the symbolism: "Not a wasteland, but a great inverted forest/with all the foliage underground."

Corinne is floored by the poem, calls Waner and tries to get more information on the poet. His name is Ray Ford, twice winner of a prestigious fellowship and an instructor at Columbia University (the same college Salinger's literary character Seymour Glass teaches at). Corinne arranges a meeting with Ford. He tells her that as a young man he worked at a race track, running bets. He is befriended by a woman who writes poems on scraps of paper. Ford memorizes these until he has a volume of poetry in his mind. Ford writes his own poems at this point, with large block lettering. Ford explains that the poetry emerged from him slowly, reflecting the pain of his life.

Corinne is mesmerized by Raymond Ford and initiates a romantic relationship. The two of them meet regularly at a Chinese food restaurant and talk. She invites him to a party. Reluctantly, he accepts. While there he is quiet until he starts on a poet he admires and impresses the academics at the party without showing off his genius. Soon after she and Ford are married, Corinne receives a letter in the mail. It is from Mary Croft, who had noticed the wedding announcement in the New York Times and who wants Ford to read some of her poetry. Corinne invites Croft to their house. When she arrives Ford dismisses her work and declares "a poet doesn't invent his poetry—he finds it." Ford and Corinne's relationship begins to crack under the stress of the poet's dedication to his work and introspection. Ford leaves Corinne; later, following a lead from a man who turns out to be Croft's estranged husband, Corinne finds Ford living with Croft. Among other things, Croft's husband reveals that his wife is older than she appears (a woman of 31, not a college girl of 20, as she'd claimed to be), and the negligent mother of a ten-year-old son.

Ford lives with Croft in a large Pennsylvania city, in a dilapidated apartment bereft of literature. He is drinking a highball when Corinne shows up to see him. His senses dulled, and his creative output stymied, Ford is a prisoner of "the Brain." This, he explains to Corinne, is his mother: The insensitive and cruel person who had first introduced him to the world of the ignorant and dull. Corinne pleads with him to come back; instead, Ford, the genius who sees what others can't, closes his eyes to the world of beauty by drowning his perceptions in ether and making himself dependent upon a woman who reincarnates his dead mother.

== Publication history and reception ==
During the Post-war era at the time Salinger conceived “The Inverted Forest,” he was straddling social and spiritual influences. Kenneth Slawenski writes that while living in New York City, Salinger “found himself attempting to live in two separate realities: the “inverted” world of spiritual creativity and the social world of Greenwich Village clubs and poker games.”

Cosmopolitan termed the work “a novella” in its pre-publication promotion and provided a preface to the work with descriptors such as “fascinating”, “original,” “unusual magazine fare”, and cautioning that any praise for the story was “a wild understatement.” John Wenke reports that “The Inverted Forest” would likely have been among stories selected to appear in the 1952 by Little, Brown and Company in the Nine Stories collection of short fiction. Despite Cosmopolitan's efforts “The Inverted Forest” was fell short of expectations.

Literary critic A. E. Hotchner, an editor at Cosmopolitan, reports that readers flooded the office with letters registering disappointment and protest, claiming they had been misled as to the story’s virtues.

Salinger decided not to have the novella published in the United States in another form. By 2017 the 1947 Cosmopolitan issues with the story were on sale in the U.S. for about $500 each.

== Critical Assessment ==
Calling Salinger’s “30,000 word novella his most ambitious project yet,” Kenneth Slawenski chides “The Inverted Forest” for its “overdrawn length and aimlessness.” While critic John Wenke grants that “The Inverted Forest” is “an ambitious, but unformed experiment,” literary critic Ian Hamilton characterizes the story as “rambling, narcissistic, and wasteful of its bewildered energy.”

The 1946 story is indicative of Salinger’s Post-war spiritual evolution, during which he began studying forms of Buddhism and mystical Catholicism. “The Inverted Forest”, is Salinger’s first attempt to enlighten his readers on the worthiness of mystical spirituality.

== Theme ==
The title of “The Inverted Forest” is derived from the “artistic and spiritual” struggle of the protagonist Raymond Ford — “an enigmatic poet-drunk” — to escape the influence of a repressive mother and develop his artistic talents clandestinely “as an inverted forest might grow underground.”

In adulthood, Ford realizes his artistic aspirations by means of a precarious balance between his subterranean or “inverted” existence and the cruelties of the real world. Ultimately, Ford is defeated by his past. Kenneth Slawenski writes:

In Ford’s third manifestation, he enters the world aboveground, where the destructive influences of his first stage overwhelm his spiritual capabilities to counter them. In the end, Ford’s inverted forest is torn up by its roots.

Slawenski adds that the story “contains themes that will dominate Salinger’s future writings. Through the story, the author asserts his conviction that art and spirituality are synonymous and his belief that inspiration is connected to spiritual revelation…rais[ing] questions regarding the ability of art to survive the hostility of modern society.”

== Translations ==
Despite the lack of availability of the original novella in its home country, unofficial Persian translations, by 2006, were widely circulated in Iran. Iran does not recognize various international copyright accords.

== Sources ==
- Hamiton, Ian. 1988. In Search of J. D. Salinger. Random House, 1988. ISBN 978-0571269273
- Slawenski, Kenneth. 2010. J. D. Salinger: A Life. Random House, New York. ISBN 978-1-4000-6951-4
- Wenke, John. 1991. J. D. Salinger: A Study of the Short Fiction. Twaynes Studies in Short Fiction, Gordon Weaver, General Editor. Twayne Publishers, New York. ISBN 0-8057-8334-2
