= Personal Notes of an Infantryman =

- Short story by J. D. Salinger
- Country: United States
- Language: English

Publication
- Published in: Collier’s
- Publication date: 12 December 1942

"Personal Notes of an Infantryman" is an uncollected work of short fiction by J. D. Salinger which appeared in the December 12, 1942 issue of Collier's.

== Plot ==
The story concerns an older man trying to get in the military, and then overseas to combat, despite the obstacles in his way. Collier's published it in the December 12, 1942 issue.

== Critical Assessment ==
An example of Salinger’s early single-page “patriotic bromides” published by Collier’s during WWII, the story includes “a cute-to-sickening” surprise ending. It was part of the magazine's "Short Short Story" series illustrated by Warren Baumgartner. A “glib comedy,” the story contrasts with Salinger’s more serious-minded tales dealing with men and boys at war, such as “Soft-Boiled Sergeant” (1944).

Written as an expedient to sustain his early success as a published writer, Salinger, aware of “which magazines like what kind of writing,” formulated “Personal Notes of an Infantryman” to make it particularly appealing to Collier’s editors: “A neatly predictable O. Henry ending…imbued with patriotism and a warmth toward the military.” Biographer Kenneth Slawenski reports on Salinger’s own appraisal of the story:

“Infantryman” was deployed by Salinger only as a literary filler, to plug the gap between his period of literary inaction and the completion of more discerning works. It was certainly not a story that Salinger bragged about.

== Sources ==
- Slawenski, Kenneth. 2010. J. D. Salinger: A Life. Random House, New York. ISBN 978-1-4000-6951-4
- Wenke, John. 1991. J. D. Salinger: A Study of the Short Fiction. Twaynes Studies in Short Fiction, Gordon Weaver, General Editor. Twayne Publishers, New York. ISBN 0-8057-8334-2
