= The Long Debut of Lois Taggett =

- Short story by J. D. Salinger
- Country: United States
- Language: English

Publication
- Published in: Story
- Publication date: September–October 1942

"The Long Debut of Lois Taggett" is an uncollected work of short fiction by J. D. Salinger which appeared in the September–October 1942 issue of Story.

== Plot ==
Biographer Kenneth Slawenski provides this sketch of the story:

"The Long Debut of Lois Taggett" is the tale of a debutante and her long process of coming out. Throughout this story, Lois struggles to deal with the harshness of reality and maintain her own humanity. Before she can let go of pretense, she must first deal with a psychotic husband, a loveless second marriage, and her child's crib death.

== Background ==
During 1941, Salinger wrote numerous works of short fiction, “each designed to find his own writing style and distinguish what was salable to various magazines.” Eager to be published in The New Yorker, he submitted at least eleven stories to the journal, all of these rejected, among them “The Long Debut of Lois Taggett.” The eventual publication of “Lois Taggett” is linked to Salinger’s 1941 “Slight Rebellion Off Madison.” The latter story was the first Salinger work accepted by The New Yorker, slated for publication in their December 1941 issue.

With the attack on Pearl Harbor on December 7, 1941, The New Yorker quickly pulled “Slight Rebellion” from the upcoming issue: as the United States prepared to enter World War II, the American public “was no longer anxious to read the frivolous whining of dissatisfied upper-crust youths.” “Slight Rebellion” would not appear in The New Yorker until after war in December 1946.

Salinger, disappointed by this setback, compensated by instructing his agent Dorothy Olding to submit “Lois Taggett” to Story magazine immediately. Slawenski notes that the story “was accepted for publication by Story, rescuing it from oblivion, and pleasing to Salinger.”

== Theme ==
Salinger presents “a sympathetic life study” of socialite Lois Taggett, and satirizes the materialistic values of the privileged upper-middle-class world she inhabits. Salinger’s cynical voice is expressed in the following passage: “[Lois] didn’t do badly. She had a good figure, dressed expensively and in good taste, and was considered Intelligent. That was the first season when Intelligent was the thing to be.” Lois is the victim of “the inexplicably deranged” Bill Tedderson, a social-climber who marries her for her good looks, sophistication and family fortune. Bill inflicts gratuitous cruelties on Lois - burning her hand with a cigarette and smashing her foot with a golf club. His psychotic behavior is assumed to be an element of the social milieu of the rich.

As an exploration of the “incursions of psychosis,” Salinger fails to provide a motive for Ted’s “inexplicable violence” and, as such, “the tale suffers from serious structural problems” in its narrative.

== Sources ==
- French, Warren. 1988. J. D. Salinger Revisited. Twayne Publishers, Boston. G. K. Hall & Co. ISBN 978-0805775228
- Slawenski, Kenneth. 2010. J. D. Salinger: A Life. Random House, New York. ISBN 978-1-4000-6951-4
- Wenke, John. 1991. J. D. Salinger: A Study of the Short Fiction. Twaynes Studies in Short Fiction, Gordon Weaver, General Editor. Twayne Publishers, New York. ISBN 0-8057-8334-2
