= Elaine (short story) =

Short story published by J. D. Salinger

- Short story by J. D. Salinger
- Country: United States
- Language: English

Publication
- Published in: Story
- Publication date: March–April, 1945

"Elaine" is an uncollected work of short fiction by J. D. Salinger which appeared in the March–April, 1945 issue of Story.

== Plot ==
The sixteen-year-old Elaine lives with her mother and grandmother in the Bronx. She is a beautiful young girl unaware of the miasma of the city around her. One reason for this is that she is intellectually years behind her peers, graduating from eighth grade at 16 after being "tested" at age 7 and forced to stay back two grades. Salinger writes that she is one of only two students wearing lipstick at the graduation ceremony.

Elaine and her mother spend the bulk of their time together watching movies at the local cinema—this seems to be the world both of them escape to. They find a "fourth-rate picture exceptionally engrossing" while watching it with the super of their building. At this point in the story Elaine is introduced to sexuality when Mr. Freelander, their landlord, touches her leg during the movie. She does not recognize this as an inappropriate gesture and doesn't tell her mother about it.

Later, she meets an usher at the theater, who asks her out on a date. She looks stunning as he picks her up with his friends and they go to the beach. Throughout the story Elaine is unable to pick up on social cues and participate in conversations, suggesting she has a learning disability of some kind. Elaine ends up under the boardwalk where she has sex with her date.

Elaine arranges to marry this boy, Teddy Schmidt, a month later. During the ceremony her mother challenges Teddy, calling him a "sissy" and refuses to let her daughter take part in the wedding. Elaine's mother and grandmother walk across the room and take Elaine back with them as Teddy stands by helpless. Outside the three of them walk towards the theater, to see a Henry Fonda movie.

== Background ==
In late 1943, when Salinger was preparing to depart with the 12th Infantry Regiment for combat duty in Europe, he was informed that three of his works of short fiction had been accepted by The Saturday Evening Post for publication. Buoyed by the news, he sent his manuscript for “Elaine” to The New Yorker confident that the work would be welcomed. He included a caveat that the story be presented intact without any alterations whatsoever. Fiction editor Wolcott Gibbs and chief editor William Keepers Maxwell Jr. interpreted these conditions as a flagrant ultimatum: the submission was instantly rejected. Maxwell informed Salinger’s agent Dorothy Olding that the story “just doesn’t seem quite right for us”.

While Salinger was overseas, Story magazine accepted “Elaine” for publication “at the usual fee of $25.” The story appeared in the March–April edition of Story in 1945.

== Theme ==
As a child, Elaine is presented with two awards as a “Beautiful Child” contestant, despite the fact that she is deemed “mentally deficient”: she spends nine years in elementary school before graduating. Literary critic John Wenke notes that Elaine is destined to be an lovely object, never an active agent in her own affairs: “Her fate is to be both beautiful object and dumb symbol. Her role will always be to stand still and look pretty. In a school [drama] production, Elaine Cooney enacted the part of the Statue of Liberty. Hers was the only non-speaking part in the pageant.” When Elaine accompanies her mother, grandmother and their landlord, Mr. Freelander to the movies, Mr. Freelander takes a seat next to Elaine, “a woman who houses the innocent and impervious mind of a child.” Literary critic John Wenke provides this excerpt from the story revealing the depth of Elaine’s ignorance:

[Mr. Freelander] pressed his leg against Elaine’s. She made no attempt to move her leg away from his. She was simply unaware of the imposed intimacy…[S]he was totally unqualified to accommodate sex and Mickey Mouse simultaneously. There was room for Mickey; no more.

Elaine and her family come into contact with a “Hollywood- and radio-promoted world populated with star newspaper reporters, crackerjack young city editors, young brain surgeons…all of her men speak in deep, trained voices that sometimes swooped pleasantly through a sixteen-year-old girl’s legs.” Among these social types she meets, and is quickly seduced, by Theodore “Teddy” Schimdt. Biographer Kenneth Slawenski identifies the central theme of the work:

What elevates “Elaine” above Salinger’s previous stories is the suggestion that Elaine cannot now return to a world of innocent illusion; once she has been defiled, her purity begins to fade…

Slawenski notes that though Elaine is rescued from a bad marriage by the family’s matriarch, her descent back into the seductive illusions of the silver screen is inevitable: “Elaine is once again stranded in a world that will complete the decay that Teddy has set in motion,”

Elaine’s fate does not appear as deeply tragic in Salinger’s story. The narrator is content to see her consigned to a life informed by Hollywood fantasies, given her intellectual limitations. Wenke observes that the story “concludes with Salinger’s comic reassertion of Elaine’s safe world of movie love.”

== Sources ==
- Slawenski, Kenneth. 2010. J. D. Salinger: A Life. Random House, New York. ISBN 978-1-4000-6951-4
- Wenke, John. 1991. J. D. Salinger: A Study of the Short Fiction. Twaynes Studies in Short Fiction, Gordon Weaver, General Editor. Twayne Publishers, New York. ISBN 0-8057-8334-2
