= For Esmé—with Love and Squalor =

Short story by J. D. Salinger

- Short story by J.D. Salinger
- Front cover (1960 edition)
- Country: United States
- Language: English

Publication
- Published in: The New Yorker
- Publication type: Print
- Publication date: April 8, 1950

"For Esmé—with Love and Squalor" is a short story by J. D. Salinger. It recounts an American sergeant's meeting with a young girl before being sent into combat in World War II. Originally published in The New Yorker on April 8, 1950, it was anthologized in Salinger's Nine Stories two years later (while the story collection's American title is Nine Stories, it is titled as For Esmé—with Love & Squalor and Other Stories in most other countries).

The short story was immediately popular with readers; less than two weeks after its publication, on April 20, Salinger "had already gotten more letters about 'For Esmé' than he had for any story he had published." According to biographer Kenneth Slawenski, the story is "widely considered one of the finest literary pieces to result from the Second World War." Author Paul Alexander calls it a "minor masterpiece".

When Salinger submitted the story to The New Yorker in late 1949, it was at first returned, and he then reedited his manuscript, shortening it by six pages.

== Plot ==
The narrator receives an invitation to a wedding that will take place in England, but will not be able to attend, because the wedding date conflicts with a planned visit from his wife's mother. The narrator does not know the groom, but he knows the bride, having met her almost six years earlier. His response to the invitation is to offer a few written notes regarding the bride.

The first of the two episodes the narrator relates occurs during a stormy afternoon in Devon, England, in 1944. A group of enlisted American soldiers are finishing up training for intelligence operations in the upcoming D-Day landings. The narrator takes a solitary stroll into town, and enters a church to listen to a children's choir rehearsal. One of the choir members, a girl of about thirteen, has a presence and deportment that draws his attention. When he departs, he finds that he has been strangely affected by the children's "melodious and unsentimental" singing.

Ducking into a tearoom to escape the rain, the narrator encounters the girl again, this time accompanied by her little brother and their governess. Sensing his loneliness, the girl engages the narrator in conversation. The reader learns that her name is Esmé, and that she and her brother Charles are orphans – their mother dead, the father killed in North Africa while serving with the British Army. She wears his huge military wristwatch as a remembrance. Esmé is bright, well-mannered and mature for her age, but troubled that she may be a "cold person" and is striving to be more "compassionate".

In the next episode, the scene changes to a military setting, and there is a deliberate shift in the point of view; the narrator no longer refers to himself as "I", but as "Sergeant X". Allied forces occupy Germany in the weeks following V-E Day. Sergeant X is stationed in Bavaria and has just returned to his quarters after visiting a field hospital where he has been treated for a nervous breakdown. He still exhibits the symptoms of his mental disorder. "Corporal Z" (surname Clay), a fellow soldier who has served closely with him, casually and callously remarks upon the sergeant's physical deterioration. When Clay departs, Sergeant X begins to rifle through a batch of unopened letters and discovers a small package, postmarked from Devon almost a year before. It contains a letter from Esmé and Charles, and she has enclosed her father's wristwatch – "a talisman" – and suggests to Sergeant X that he "wear it for the duration of the war". Deeply moved, he immediately begins a recovery from his descent into disillusionment and spiritual vacancy, regaining his "faculties".

== Analysis ==
As the war receded in memory, America was embracing an "unquestioned patriotism and increasing conformity", and a romantic version of the war was gradually replacing its devastating realities. Salinger wished to speak for those who still struggled to cope with the "inglorious" aspects of combat.

"For Esmé—with Love and Squalor" was conceived as a tribute to those Second World War veterans who in post-war civilian life were still suffering from so-called "battle fatigue" – post-traumatic stress disorder. The story also served to convey to the general public what many ex-soldiers endured.

Salinger had served as a non-commissioned officer of intelligence services at the European front – the narrator "Sergeant X" is "suspiciously like Salinger himself". The story is more than merely a personal recollection; rather, it is an effort to offer hope and healing – a healing of which Salinger himself partook. Slawenski points out that “though we may recognize Salinger in Sergeant X’s character, [WWII] veterans of the times recognized themselves."

== Characters ==
- Sergeant X: The narrator of the story. Just before shipping out to the Normandy in the first part, he describes his meeting with a young girl in Devon. The second part, which is told in the third person, is about the crisis experienced by the hero during the war days. In this section, his name is referred to as Staff Sergeant X.
- Esmé: She is a thirteen-year-old girl whom Sergeant X met the day before he joined the war. In the second part of the story, Esmé sends him a letter while Sergeant X is at war. At the beginning of the story, it is explained to the readers that Esmé will marry and also invited the Sergeant X to the wedding ceremony.
- Charles: Esmé's five-year-old brother. He is with Esmé on the day he meets the Chief Sergeant.
- Corporal Z (Clay): He is the roommate of Staff Sergeant X in the European days after landing. Clay, an emotional, simple and rude man, is thought to be the symbol of the deprivation part of the story.
- Loretta: Clay's fiancée. She often writes letters to Clay in the war.
- Ms. Megley: Ms. Megley, the caregivers of Esmé and Charles, is the person who brought the children to the teahouse on the day they met Staff Sergeant X.
- Staff Sergeant X's wife: At the beginning of the story, the narrator (Staff Sergeant X) remembers the name. X explains that they decided not to go to Esmé's wedding after talking to his wife.
- Grencher: Sergeant X's Mother-in-law. The name is mentioned at the beginning of the story.
- Sergeant X's older brother: In the second part of the story, he reads a thoughtlessly written letter from his older brother X.

== Publication history ==
"For Esmé" was originally published in The New Yorker in April 1950. In April 1953, Little, Brown and Company (a Boston-based publishing company) published "For Esmé" as part of the anthology Nine Stories. The same anthology was published in 1953 in London by Hamish Hamilton under the title For Esmé—with Love and Squalor: and other stories.

In 1954, the BBC attempted to purchase the rights to turn "For Esmé" into a radio drama series, but Salinger declined.

In 1959, Harborough Publishing (London) issued a paperback edition of "For Esme" that featured Esme as a "dishy blonde" on the cover. Salinger disapproved of this edition so emphatically that he never spoke to his UK publisher again.

Since its original publication, "For Esmé" has been translated into many languages, including German, Swedish, Japanese, Spanish, and Polish.

== In popular culture ==
Belle and Sebastian's track "I Fought in a War" on their album Fold Your Hands Child, You Walk Like a Peasant is inspired by the atmosphere in the story.

In Book the Sixth: The Ersatz Elevator of A Series of Unfortunate Events by Lemony Snicket, the main characters are sent to live with a couple named Esmé and Jerome Squalor.

American Football's track "Letters and Packages" contains references to the story.

== Abandoned film version ==
In 1963, film and TV director Peter Tewksbury approached Salinger about making a film version of the story. Salinger agreed, on condition that he himself cast the role of Esmé. He had in mind for the role Jan de Vries, the young daughter of his friend, the writer Peter de Vries. However, by the time that Salinger and Tewksbury had settled on the final version of the script, Jan had turned eighteen and was considered by Salinger to be too old for the part. The film was never made.

== Bibliography ==
- Slawenski, Kenneth. 2010. J.D. Salinger: A Life. Random House, New York. ISBN 978-1-4000-6951-4
