= The Young Folks (short story) =

- Short story by J. D. Salinger
- Country: United States
- Language: English

Publication
- Published in: Story
- Publication date: March–April 1940

"The Young Folks" is a work of short fiction by J. D. Salinger published in the March–April 1940 issue of Story magazine. The story is included in the 2014 Salinger collection Three Early Stories.

"The Young Folks" is Salinger's first published story.

== Plot ==
The story takes place at a New York cocktail party and details the emptiness of the conversation between a young woman and a male college student.

Salinger wrote, "About eleven o'clock, Lucille Henderson, observing that her party was soaring at the proper height, and just having been smiled at by Jack Delroy, forced herself to glance over in the direction of Edna Phillips, who since eight o'clock had been sitting in the big red chair, smoking cigarettes and yodelling hellos and wearing a very bright eye which young men were not bothering to catch."

== Style and Theme ==
Literary critic John Wenke characterizes "The Young Folks" as a critique of “social manners” in which Salinger “depicts a sterile world populated by petty people” - a world of social elites of which he was a member. Biographer Kenneth Slawenski notes the influence of one of Salinger's contemporaries who died the year that the story was published:

The story satirizes characters very much like himself and the people that he knew: upper-class college students obsessed with the petty details of their own shallow lives. It was characteristic of its time and heavily influenced by the writing style of F. Scott Fitzgerald.

Slawenski adds that “rather than depicting affluent young lives an enviable, ‘The Young Folks’ shone a stark spotlight on the unglamorous truths of upper-class society, exposing the emptiness and unromantic realities of their existence...”

== History and rights ==
After learning of the existence of 21 stories written before the publication of The Catcher in the Rye in a 2013 documentary about Salinger, publishers researched rights to Salinger stories and learned J.D. Salinger never registered the rights of "The Young Folks" short story. In 2014 "The Young Folks" was published, along with two other Salinger short stories, in the book Three Early Stories.

== Sources ==
- Slawenski, Kenneth. 2010. J. D. Salinger: A Life. Random House, New York. ISBN 978-1-4000-6951-4
- Wenke, John. 1991. J. D. Salinger: A Study of the Short Fiction. Twaynes Studies in Short Fiction, Gordon Weaver, General Editor. Twayne Publishers, New York. ISBN 0-8057-8334-2
