= The Stranger (Salinger short story) =

Short story by J. D. Salinger

"The Stranger" is a short story written by J. D. Salinger first published in the December 1, 1945 issue of Collier's magazine.

== Plot ==
It tells the story of Babe Gladwaller, who has recently left the 12th regiment of the United States Army and has gone to visit the former girlfriend of Vincent Caulfield with his younger sister Mattie.

Explaining that he is in a rush, he sits down with the woman and gives her the details of Vincent's death, "shooting down" the lies of how soldiers' deaths are portrayed in movies and popular culture. Babe mentions the post-war prospect of teaching, the profession of other characters in his stories, and one that he himself considered at one point.
