= Soft-Boiled Sergeant =

- Short story by J. D. Salinger
- Country: United States
- Language: English

Publication
- Published in: Saturday Evening Post
- Publication date: 15 April 1944

"Soft-Boiled Sergeant" is an uncollected work of short fiction by J. D. Salinger which appeared in the 15 April 1944 issue of The Saturday Evening Post. The story was illustrated by Graham Kaye.

== Plot ==
The story is presented as a first-person vernacular narrative by protagonist Philly Barnes, a World War II combat veteran. Salinger uses a "tale-with-in-a-tale to structure the account. "Soft-Boiled Sergeant" chronicles a young soldier's entry into basic training into the US military shortly before the United States entered World War II. Philly Barnes, only 16-years-old, has lied about his age to army recruiters so as to escape his life as a homeless drifter.

Staff Sergeant Burke befriends the boy, recognizing a fellow spirit. A former hobo himself, and now an army "lifer", Burke—of short stature and a grotesquely ugly face— is a solitary man of genuine decency and courage and skillful at handling practical matters. He helps the young Barnes, who suffers from low self-esteem, adjust to army life. After Barnes ships out to serve overseas, he never sees Burke again. He does, however, learn the details of what befell the "soft-boiled sergeant." Barnes is killed during the attack on Pearl Harbor while rescuing a number of panicked servicemen.

== Background ==
"Unlike many soldiers who had been impatient for the D-Day invasion, Salinger was far from naive (with dots) about war. In stories like 'Soft-boiled Sergeant" and 'Last Day of the Last Furlough" he had already expressed disgust with the false idealism applied to combat and attempted to explain that war was a bloody, inglorious affair..." —Biographer Kenneth Slawenski in J. D. Salinger: A Life (2010)

"Soft-boiled Sergeant," was written while Salinger was stationed at Bainbridge Air Base, among three stories that Salinger wrote in 1943 which were sold to The Saturday Evening Post in January 1944. The other two stories were Both Parties Concerned (submitted as "Wake Me When It Thunders") and "Last Day of the Last Furlough.")

While Salinger was in Europe preparing with the 12th Infantry Regiment for the D-Day invasions, he discovered that the Post had changed the title of the work from "Death of a Dogface" to "Soft-boiled Sergeant" without consulting him. He was further outraged to discover that Post editors had placed the story amid garishly illustrated endorsements for "movie stars" and ads for "Calox Tooth Powder." Salinger felt these juxtapositions distracted readers from the serious themes presented in the story. The Post, Collier's and Harper's, referred disparagingly as "the slicks" because of their glossy covers, became repellent to the author. According to biographer Kenneth Slawenski, Salinger "swore he never again deal with the slicks, regardless of how much they paid."

== Theme ==
"The true story of the ugly , unphotogenic Burke, the 'soft-boiled sergeant,' provides a sobering antidote to Hollywood's fantasy portrayals. In this story, bad [cinematic] art - phony art - is a seductive soporific that corrupts one's sensibilities by making horror seem nice. Burke's story reflects a case of actual heroic self-sacrifice. It is also a story of injustice, waste, and tragedy."—Literary critic John Wenke in J. D. Salinger: A Study of the Short Fiction (1991)

The central theme of "Soft-Boiled Sergeant"—the contrast between Hollywood portrayals of combat and the actualities of violent death—is presented as a complaint by war veteran Philly Barnes concerning his spouse Juanitas' fascination with war movies. Literary critic John Wenke offers this monologue from protagonist Philly Barnes:

Juanita, she's always dragging me to a million movies, and we see these shows all about war and stuff. You see a lot of real handsome guys always getting shot pretty neat, right where it don't spoil their look none, and they always got plenty of time, before they croak, to give their love to some doll back home...Then we see the guy's hometown, and around a million people, including the mayor and the dead guy's folks and his doll, and maybe the President, all around the guy's box, making speeches and wearing medals and spiffier in morning duds than most folks do all dolled up for a party.

Salinger provides this eulogy to his character Burke in which the life and death of the soldier serve as a "counterpoint" to all romanticized movie versions of war:

He died all by himself, and he didn't have no message to give to no girl or nobody, and there wasn't nobody throwing a big classy funeral for him here in the States, and no hotshot bugler blowed taps for him.

== Sources ==
- Slawenski, Kenneth. 2010. J. D. Salinger: A Life. Random House, New York. ISBN 978-1-4000-6951-4
- Wenke, John. 1991. J. D. Salinger: A Study of the Short Fiction. Twaynes Studies in Short Fiction, Gordon Weaver, General Editor. Twayne Publishers, New York. ISBN 0-8057-8334-2
