= A Girl I Knew =

Short story by J. D. Salinger

- Short story by J. D. Salinger
- Country: United States
- Language: English

Publication
- Published in: Good Housekeeping
- Publication date: February 1948

"A Girl I Knew" is an uncollected work of short fiction by J. D. Salinger which appeared in the February 1948 issue of Good Housekeeping.

== Plot ==
The story begins as the narrator fails out of college. His father offers to send him to Europe to learn languages he could use to help his business. While in Vienna, the narrator meets a girl, Leah. She is Jewish and attempts to give him lessons in German as he introduces her to pieces of Americana. He frequently stumbles over his new language while ingratiating himself with her and her family. They both spend time in his apartment, which is above hers. Some time passes before the narrator transfers to Paris, and then goes back to college in America.

While in school he receives a letter from Leah informing him she is married. As with other letters in Salinger's works, the narrator carries it around with him for some time. News begins to spread that the Nazis have invaded Vienna, and he enlists as an infantryman. Since he is in Intelligence, he uses some of the skills acquired while studying the various languages. The story closes as he is in Vienna, after the war, and hears that Leah is dead. Presumably she was sent to Buchenwald, as the story alludes to this. The narrator finds the apartment, which is now an officer's quarters. He notices everything about it has changed and leaves abruptly.

== Background ==
Salinger enrolled for the autumn semester at New York University in 1936, but dropped out shortly thereafter, having neglected his coursework.

His father, a successful cheese and meat retailer, attempted to entice his son into the family business by sending him to Europe as a translator for business associate Oskar Robinson, a Polish ham importer and slaughterhouse owner. Embarking in April 1937, Salinger traveled to Vienna, Austria via England and France, where he lived with a Jewish family for ten months, improving his bookish German. Working in Robinson’s Bydgoszcz, Poland meatpacking plant, Salinger discovered he was “not suited for his father’s line of work.”

Few details are known about his experiences in Vienna, other than that the 19-year-old Salinger “experienced his first serious romance” with the family’s young daughter.

Salinger witnessed the increasing Nazi-organized anti-Semitic terrorism inflicted on Viennese Jews. An American citizen of Jewish ancestry, Salinger was able to depart for New York in April 1938, shortly before German military forces entered Austria. Slawenski reports that “by 1945, every member of Salinger’s Austrian family had been murdered in the Holocaust.”

Salinger searched, unsuccessfully, to locate the family after the war. “The Girl I Knew” is Salinger’s memorial to the family and, in particular, their daughter.

The story was originally titled "Wien, Wien" ("Vienna, Vienna"). Salinger was deeply resentful the title was changed by the editors of the magazine.

== Theme ==
Salinger’s story is more than merely a sentimental reflection on a first romance. The horrifying fate of Leah and her parents is personified in an American social type, here a US army sergeant who provides security at the family's former residence, now occupied by commissioned officers. John, wishing to view the apartment where he last saw Leah, explains to the sergeant: “She and her family were burned to death in an incinerator, I’m told.” The sergeant responds with brutal disregard: “Yeah? What was she, a Jew of something?”

From this exchange, Kenneth Slawenski identifies the central theme of “A Girl I Knew”:

Although not directly guilty of the death of Leah and her family, [the American sergeant] is held nonetheless responsible because of his attitude and the realization that without such indifference the Holocaust would never have taken place. The character of Leah therefore represents more than a romantic interest...she symbolizes the fragile and beautiful things that have been crushed by the Second World War...her treatment even after her death touches on a broader moral issue: the very nature of humankind and our ability to commit or condone atrocities through indifference.

== Sources ==
- Kenneth Slawenski |Slawenski, Kenneth. 2010. J. D. Salinger: A Life. Random House, New York. ISBN 978-1-4000-6951-4
- Wenke, John. 1991. J. D. Salinger: A Study of the Short Fiction. Twaynes Studies in Short Fiction, Gordon Weaver, General Editor. Twayne Publishers, New York. ISBN 0-8057-8334-2
