= Both Parties Concerned =

- Short story by J. D. Salinger
- Country: United States
- Language: English

Publication
- Published in: The Saturday Evening Post
- Publication date: 26 February 1944

"Both Parties Concerned" is an uncollected work of short fiction by J. D. Salinger which appeared in the 26 February 1944 issue of The Saturday Evening Post.

The original title of the story as submitted by Salinger was “Wake Me When It Thunders” to emphasize the story’s climax. The distinctive first-person narrative voice that identifies Salinger’s protagonist Holden Caulfield in his 1951 novel Catcher in the Rye first emerged in “Both Parties Concerned” with the character Billy Vullmer.

== Plot ==
The story examines the lives of a young working-class couple, the twenty-year-old Billy Vullmer and his spouse of 17, Ruthie, chronicling their struggle to mature emotionally and cope with raising a baby. Billy, in an attempt to evade his responsibilities as a young father, insists that Ruthie accompany him on nightly visits to music venues where they drink and dance. Ruth recognizes this as selfish and juvenile behavior. She briefly leaves Billy. He is deeply shaken by the separation.

During an electrical storm, Billy wakes and discovers that Ruth is not in bed. He goes downstairs and discovers her alone in the kitchen, terrified by the thunder. Billy recognizes her suffering and comforts her. His expression of empathy marks the beginning of a rapprochement between the couple and the prospect that he is gaining a new emotional maturity.

== Style and Theme ==
The first-person narrator in “Both Parties Concerned,” the young married father, Billy Vullmer, resembles the distinctive voice of Holden Caulfield in Salinger’s 1951 novel Catcher in the Rye. Salinger adopts a first-person account so as to elaborate Billy’s struggle to discover and express his discontents. Literary critic John Wenke observes that “like Holden in Catcher (italics), Billy tends to repeat rhetorical tropes.” Wenke continues:

Speaking of Ruthie, Billy claims, “I know her like a book. I mean I know her like a book.” This instinctual redundancy expresses Billy’s nervousness, urgency and insecurity. Repeatedly the past tense narrative passes into the present tense…allow[ing] the thoughts of one instant to be revised, if not contradicted, in the next…”She was being very cynical like. I don’t like that. It doesn’t bother me, but I don’t like it.”

The characterizations of Billy and Ruthie were widely recognized by Americans, especially couples, who after two years of war identified with their difficulties. Biographer Kenneth Slawenski remarks on the significance of Salinger’s ability to convey his protagonist’s experience:

Billy and Ruthie were created as simple characters, but their simplicity adds to their believability. Their reaction to events are commonplace, leading to a certain intimacy between characters and readers…Salinger’s ability to transmit self-image to the reader in this way is what gives his writing life.

== Sources ==
- Slawenski, Kenneth. 2010. J. D. Salinger: A Life. Random House, New York. ISBN 978-1-4000-6951-4
- Wenke, John. 1991. J. D. Salinger: A Study of the Short Fiction. Twaynes Studies in Short Fiction, Gordon Weaver, General Editor. Twayne Publishers, New York. ISBN 0-8057-8334-2
