= The Varioni Brothers =

- Short story by J. D. Salinger
- Country: United States
- Language: English

Publication
- Published in: The Saturday Evening Post
- Publication date: 17 July 1943

"The Varioni Brothers" is an uncollected work of short fiction by J. D. Salinger which appeared in the 17 July 1943 issue of The Saturday Evening Post.

== Plot ==
Joe Varioni is a sensitive artist whose immense promise as a writer is thwarted by the manipulations of his musician brother, Sonny, who forces Joe to write commercial song lyrics instead of his novel. The brothers are hugely successful in their songwriting endeavors, but Joe is shot dead in error at one of their celebrated parties by the hired gunman of a mobster (the intended target being Sonny, who has welched on a gambling debt). Years later, prematurely aged and deeply remorseful, Sonny, suffering from a guilty conscience, attempts to reconstruct his late brother's novel-in-progress from its numerous fragments. The story is a “tale-within-a tale-within-a-tale” initiated by an entertainment columnist, Vincent Westmorland who, for nostalgic reasons, wishes to know what had become of composer and Jazz Age impresario Sonny Varioni. His efforts to locate Sonny are rewarded when Sarah Daley Smith contacts Westmorland and informs about the now elderly Sonny:

He is in Waycross, Illinois. He’s not very well, and he’s working day and night typing up the manuscript of a lovely, wild, and possibly great novel. It was written and thrown in a trunk by Joe Varioni. It was written long-hand on yellow paper, on torn paper. The sheets are not numbered. Whole sentences and even paragraphs were marked out and rewritten on the backs of envelopes, on the unused sides of college exam papers, on the margins of railroad timetables. The job of making and tail, chapter and book, of this wild colossus is an immeasurably enervating one, requiring, one would think, youth and health and ego. Sonny Varioni has none of these. He has a hope for a kind of salvation.

Mrs. Sarah Smith, now happily married, was once in love with the brilliant and aging Sonny when she encountered him as a young college student and she remains devoted and deeply empathetic to Sonny’s self-imposed task of making amends for his brother’s death.

== Background ==
Salinger wrote “The Varioni Brothers” less as a literary endeavor and more as a work he hoped would entice adaptation to film. Before The Saturday Evening Post acquired the story, Salinger made an effort to interest Hollywood through the auspices of literary agent Max Wilkison. The studios showed some interest, but ultimately declined the offer.

Kenneth Slawenski reports that Salinger repeatedly disparaged his “The Varioni Brothers” as literature, but notes that the story —a tale that explores “the power of success to destroy true inspiration”—presented a parable that film studio executives could never have grasped. While staff sergeant Salinger served at Patterson Field, Ohio overseeing a “ditch-digging operation” in July 1943, his superiors were alerted to his publication of “The Varioni Brothers” in The Saturday Evening Post. Salinger was immediately reassigned to the Public Relations Department, (ASC) in Dayton, Ohio.

== Theme ==
Biographer Kenneth Slawenski reports that the story of Joe and Sonny Varioni “contains as unmistakable analysis of the author himself.”

What is transparent while reading “The Varioni Brothers” is that both brothers are based on Salinger himself. In order to give the Varioni brothers life, the author splits himself between two facets of his own personality and the two diverse professional roads open to him.

Slawenski points out that Salinger names one of the brothers Sonny—a nickname bestowed on him in his youth.

Literary critic John Wenke notes that Salinger “links lost love, unrealized genius, and childhood innocence” in this “tale-within-a-tale-within-a-tale.” In “The Varioni Brothers,” the brilliant songwriter Sonny Varioni appropriates his brother Joe’s lyric-writing talents and callously preempts the younger man’s realization of his own genius as a prose writer. Joe is mistakenly murdered by a mob assassin in lieu of Sonny, and will never complete his magnum opus (italics). Sonny realize he has fulfilled his own selfish aspirations at Joe’s expense. Literary critic John Wenke writes:

Salinger indicates the conflict between the artist’s need for solitude and the demands of the popular marketplace. Joe could not write novels and lyrics at the same time. By controlling Joe’s activity, Sonny not only diverted his brother from his true calling, but also used him to enhance his own craft.

Sonny’s efforts to make amends for his exploitation of Joe is parallelled by Sarah’s attempts to reconcile her own “idealized love” for Sonny with her thoroughly conventional life as a married middle-class wife and mother. Sarah never fully relinquishes her love for Sonny and. as such, sustains herself by fusing “the lost idyll with present happiness.” Just as Sonny idealizes the lost Joe, Sarah erects a memorial to the elderly and deteriorating Sonny.

== Sources ==
- Slawenski, Kenneth. 2010. J. D. Salinger: A Life. Random House, New York. ISBN 978-1-4000-6951-4
- Wenke, John. 1991. J. D. Salinger: A Study of the Short Fiction. Twaynes Studies in Short Fiction, Gordon Weaver, General Editor. Twayne Publishers, New York. ISBN 0-8057-8334-2
- Paul Levine, "J. D. Salinger: The Development of the Misfit Hero", Twentieth Century Literature 4 (1958) 92-99
