= Last Day of the Last Furlough =

"Last Day of the Last Furlough" is a short story written by American writer J. D. Salinger in 1944 and published in the July 15 issue of Saturday Evening Post. It covers the last days of furlough for Babe Gladwaller before he is shipped off to World War II.

Babe spends most of the time with his little sister, Mattie, until his fellow soldier Vincent Caulfield comes over to spend the evening with them before departing in the morning. In this story, Vincent announces his brother Holden has been reported Missing in Action. Babe and Mattie's relationship mirrors the future relationship between Holden and Phoebe in The Catcher in the Rye.
