= Whit Burnett =

American writer, teacher and editor of Story Magazine (1900–1972)

Whit Burnett (August 14, 1899 – April 22, 1973) was an American writer and educator who founded and edited the literary magazine Story. In the 1940s, Story was an important magazine in that it published the first or early works of many writers who went on to become major authors. Not only did Burnett prove to be a valuable literary birddog for new talent, but Story remained a respectable though low-paying (typically $25 per story) alternative for stories rejected by the large-circulation slick magazines published on glossy paper like Collier's or The Saturday Evening Post or the somewhat more prestigious and literary slick magazines such as The New Yorker. While Story paid poorly compared to the slicks and even the pulps and successor digest-sized magazines of its day, it paid better than most of, and had similar cachet to, the university-based and the other independent "little magazines" of its era.

Burnett and his first wife, Martha Foley, founded the magazine in Vienna, Austria, in 1931. Showcasing short stories by new authors, 67 copies of the debut issue (April–May, 1931) were mimeographed in Vienna. Two years later, the couple moved to New York City, where they continued to publish the magazine.

Burnett and Foley created The Story Press in 1936. In 1939, Harper & Bros. published his memoir The Literary Life and to Hell With It. In the Time Magazine review of the book, "Funny Editor," the anonymous reviewer characterized Burnett as a humorist.

== Columbia University ==
Burnett taught a short-story writing course at Columbia University in the 1930s and '40s. One of his students was J. D. Salinger, whom he mentored and whose first short story, "The Young Folks," was published by Burnett in Story Magazine.

Salinger, in his 1964 essay "A Salute to Whit Burnett," said that it was Burnett's use of William Faulkner's short story "That Evening Sun Go Down" in the class that taught him the importance of the author's relationship with his readers.

Burnett's plan to publish a book of Salinger's short stories in 1946 fell through, straining their relationship.

== New authors ==
By the late 1930s, the circulation of Story had climbed to 21,000 copies. In addition to Salinger, major authors introduced in Story included Charles Bukowski, Erskine Caldwell, John Cheever, James T. Farrell, Joseph Heller, Tennessee Williams, and Richard Wright. Other authors published in the pages of Story included Carson McCullers and William Saroyan.

The magazine sponsored various awards (WPA, Armed Forces), and it held an annual college fiction contest.

== Later years ==
Burnett's second wife, Hallie Southgate Burnett, began collaborating with him in 1942. During this period, Story published the early work of Truman Capote, John Knowles, and Norman Mailer. During World War II Burnett importantly edited "Time To Be Young", Selected Short Stories, for Editions for the Armed Services, Inc., established by the Council on Books in Wartime. The book was "U.S. Government Property" and not to be sold. It is one of the many extolled in "When Books Went to War: The Stories that Helped Us Win World War II" by Molly Guptill Manning. Story was briefly published in book form during the early 1950s, returning to a magazine format in 1960. Due to a lack of funds, Story folded in 1967, but it maintained its reputation through the Story College Creative Awards, which Burnett directed from 1966 to 1971.
