= Down at the Dinghy =

Short story by J. D. Salinger

"Down at the Dinghy" is a short story by J. D. Salinger, originally published in Harper's in April 1949, and included in the compilation, Nine Stories.

Written in the summer of 1948 at Lake Geneva, Wisconsin, the story marks a shift away from Salinger's literary misanthropy, which had largely been informed by his horrific combat experiences in Europe during World War II, and toward a “reaffirmation” of human interdependence and spiritual reawakening.

The piece includes “Boo Boo” Glass Tannenbaum, one of the key members of Salinger's fictional Glass family, and makes reference to two of her brothers, Seymour Glass (deceased) and Webb “Buddy” Glass.

== Plot summary ==
Told in two distinct segments, the first involves a discussion between two house servants about their employer's little boy, who has a history of running away. The second segment explores the mother's efforts to reassure her son and help him cope with his fears.

The story opens with the two house servants, Mrs. Mildred Snell and Sandra, discussing the homeowner's young son, Lionel. Sandra is very worried that the boy will tell his mother Boo Boo (Mrs. Tannenbaum, a 25-year-old lady), her employer, that she has made some anti-Semitic remarks about Lionel's Jewish father (“a big sloppy kike”). Boo Boo finds Lionel in a dinghy preparing to cast off, and refuses to allow his mother to join him. Boo Boo pretends to be admiral of the imaginary ship in order to win Lionel over and discover why he is trying to run away. He resists, even going so far as to throw his uncle Seymour's old goggles into the lake.

Lionel tells Boo Boo that Sandra called his father a "big sloppy kike". While he doesn't know what this ethnic slur means, conflating the epithet “kike” with “kite”, he nevertheless grasps its derogatory connotation. Boo Boo, in an effort to reassure the boy and help him cope with the episode, succeeds in providing him insights into her own needs and the love she feels for him. At the end of the story, they race across the beach toward home, and Lionel wins.

== Analysis ==
The story, originally titled “Killer in the Dinghy” contains some clearly autobiographical elements. Salinger (who was called “Sonny” by his family) resembles Boo Boo Tannenbaum's four-year-old son, Lionel, in that he “had a habit of running away from home when confronted by conflict.” Solidifying this association beyond any doubt, Salinger describes Lionel wearing a “Jerome the Ostrich” T-shirt – Salinger's first name is Jerome. Lionel's mother, "Boo Boo", employing great tact, succeeds in conveying to her son a simple and profound truth: fear and isolation can only be overcome through mutual support with other people.

The tale also addresses the issue of anti-Semitism in the post-war period when the facts of fascist atrocities committed against minorities, including Jews, were becoming fully understood. Salinger had personally viewed a Nazi concentration camp as a US soldier. While attending Eastern upper-middle-class private schools as a boy, Salinger, half-Jewish, had been exposed to ethnic stereotyping by his mostly Anglo-Saxon classmates. During her conversation with Mrs. Snell, Sandra says at a certain point, referring to the little Lionel: "He's gonna have a nose just like his father". "Down at the Dinghy" is not a reckoning of these personal and historical events, but rather a "reaffirmation of the faith in human connection" based upon "union, equality and compromise…"

== Characters ==
- Boo Boo: Many allusions are made to Boo Boo throughout the Glass saga, although she is rarely encountered in any of the other stories, such as Franny and Zooey, or Raise High the Roof Beam, Carpenters and Seymour: An Introduction. She is referred to as the perpetual matron of the family, and this story brings this to the forefront.
- Lionel: This is the only story in which Lionel appears or is even mentioned.
- Uncle Webb: Referred to by Boo Boo when Lionel kicked goggles into the lake. Boo Boo told Lionel, her son, that the goggles belong to his Uncle Webb and that they once belonged to his Uncle Seymour. Uncle Webb is otherwise known as Buddy in the Glass family stories.

== Related works ==
Other Glass Family stories include:

- Franny and Zooey,
- Raise High the Roof Beam, Carpenters and Seymour: An Introduction, and
- Hapworth 16, 1924.

== Bibliography ==
=== Cited in footnotes ===
- Sallinger, Jerome D. 1949. Down at the Dinghy. Harper's Magazine, January 14, 1949 in Nine Stories. Little, Brown and Company. New York (1981).
- Slawenski, Kenneth. 2010. J.D. Salinger: A Life. Random House, New York. ISBN 978-1-4000-6951-4
