= The Catcher in the Rye in popular culture =

Influence of J.D. Salinger's 1951 novel

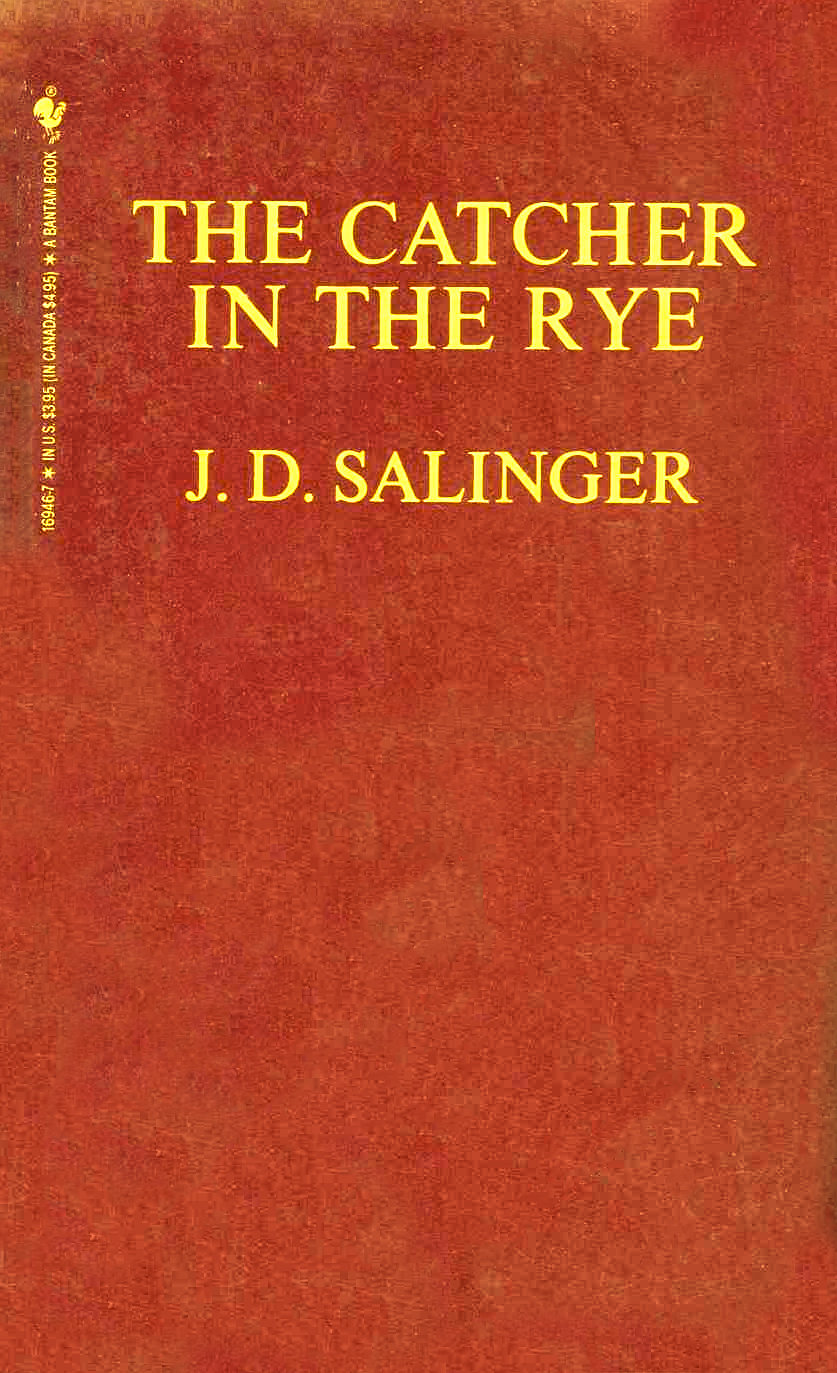
Cover from the 1985 Bantam edition

The 1951 novel The Catcher in the Rye by American author, J. D. Salinger has had a lasting influence as it remains both a bestseller and a frequently challenged book. Numerous works in popular culture have referenced the novel. Factors contributing to the novel's mystique and impact include its portrayal of protagonist Holden Caulfield; its tone of sincerity; its themes of familial neglect, tension between teens and society, and rebellion; its previous banned status; and Salinger's reclusiveness. The Catcher in the Rye has inspired "rewrites" which have been said to form their own genre. On the other hand, there are examples of similarities between the novel and other works that were not intended by their authors, which suggests that the novel is "present, at least spiritually, in ... any story line that involves quirky young people struggling to find their places in a society prone to reward conformity and condemn individuality."

While the novel is linked to several murders and murder attempts, it has been claimed that the novel's overall effect on society is "far more positive than negative."

The novel also helped popularize the slang verb "screw up".

From the late 2000s, there has been a discussion of depression as exhibited in Holden Caulfield.

== Shootings ==
The best-known event associated with The Catcher in the Rye is arguably Mark David Chapman's murder of John Lennon in 1980. Chapman identified with the novel's narrator to the extent that he wanted to change his name to Holden Caulfield. On the night he shot Lennon, Chapman was found with a copy of the book in which he had written "This is my statement" and signed Holden's name. Later, he read a passage from the novel to address the court during his sentencing. Daniel Stashower speculated that Chapman had wanted Lennon's innocence to be preserved by death, inspired by Holden's wish to preserve children's innocence despite Holden's later realization that children should be left alone.

After John Hinckley Jr.'s assassination attempt on Ronald Reagan in 1981, police found The Catcher in the Rye in his hotel room. Hinckley's possession of the novel was later dismissed as an influence, as a half dozen various other types of books were also discovered in his possession.

Robert John Bardo, who murdered Rebecca Schaeffer, was carrying the book when he visited Schaeffer's apartment in Hollywood on July 18, 1989 and murdered her.

== Films ==
Although Salinger had refused a film adaptation, many Hollywood films have based characters on Holden Caulfield. Holden has been identified as "one of the most reproduced characters on film." Furthermore, many such films reference each other.

Anthony Caputi, a specialist in dramatic literature at Cornell University, claims that the novel inspires both "variations" and "imitations", comparing it with several coming-of-age films.

- In The Collector (1965), which is based on the John Fowles novel, Clegg cannot understand why Miranda likes The Catcher in the Rye.
- In the 1990 play and 1993 film Six Degrees of Separation, the impostor Paul gives an analysis on the novel in a monologue. According to him, the novel, a "manifesto of hate" against phonies, would have been the excuse or defense for Chapman and Hinckley's shootings.
- In Conspiracy Theory (1997), Mel Gibson's character is programmed to buy the novel whenever he sees it, though he never actually reads it.
- In the novel The Perks of Being a Wallflower and its film adaptation, the protagonist, Charlie's, English teacher gives him a copy of The Catcher in the Rye. Author and director Stephen Chbosky stated that the novel was one of his favourites growing up and influenced his writing, although he tried to avoid intentionally emulating his style.
- Chasing Holden (2001) is named after Holden Caulfield. The protagonist Neil relates his life to Holden's, skips class to go to New York City, goes on a road trip to New Hampshire to find Salinger, and contemplates killing Salinger.
- Screenwriter Mike White regards the novel as "part of a literary trend that goes back to Goethe's The Sorrows of Werther (1774) ... I don't think Salinger discovered it. He just did the quintessential American version." He thought the influence of the novel may rise in Hollywood, and two of his 2002 films reflect this. In Orange County, protagonist Shaun searches for the professor who wrote the book that changed his life.
- In The Good Girl, protagonist Thomas Worther calls himself Holden and is seen reading the novel.
- Igby Goes Down (2002), originally intended to be a novel, has been interpreted as being inspired by The Catcher in the Rye, but director and screenwriter Burr Steers said it is not a direct influence and the story is more of an autobiography. On the influence of the book, Steers "liken[s] it to being a musician and being influenced by the music ingrained in you, like the Beatles."
- The Catcher in the Rye deeply influenced the 2017 biographical drama film Rebel in the Rye, which is about Salinger. It is a visual about his life, before and after World War II, and gives more about the author's life than the readers of The Catcher in the Rye learned from the novel.
- In Stanley Kubrick's adaptation of Stephen King's The Shining, the protagonists, Wendy and her son Danny, are introduced sitting at a kitchenette, with Wendy smoking and reading The Catcher in the Rye as they eat white-bread sandwiches and Danny watches TV.
- In the 2019 anime film Weathering with You the protagonist Hodaka Morishima reads The Catcher in the Rye and has themes about it.
- In the 2023 romantic comedy film Hit Man, one of the antagonists reads The Catcher in the Rye in a restaurant while waiting for the "Hit man" to show up. Which, when commented by the protagonist's co-worker, "historically speaking, is never a good sign."
- Submarine, a feature film released in 2010 references The Catcher in the Rye directly through the main character Oliver. He dubs it "A great example of the modern American novel."

== Television ==
- The main plot for the Japanese anime television series Ghost in the Shell: Stand Alone Complex (2002) hinges on elements from The Catcher in the Rye from which a character uses a digital logo representing Holden Caulfield, and the quote "I thought what I'd do was, I'd pretend I was one of those deaf-mutes." These themes and some additional quotes are also expressed in Stand Alone Complex 2nd GIG (2004), although the characters and plot have changed.
- An episode of Working had the protagonist's boss so inspired by Catcher in the Rye he makes plans to resign from the firm of Upton-Webber and ride the rails as a hobo. Matt Pfizer, the protagonist, convinces his boss not to do this when he believes that had the story continued on with Holden past puberty, he would have become a drifter who enjoyed none of the perks of corporate America.
- South Park episode "The Tale of Scrotie McBoogerballs" (2010) makes particular reference to The Catcher in the Rye and shows that its once-controversial use of vocabulary has no impact among young readers nowadays, and pokes fun at literary critics reading deeper meaning into books. It also references its connection towards the series of high-profile assassination attempts in the 1980s, with character Butters Stotch expressing a desire to kill John Lennon after reading the book until his father tells him that Lennon was already killed.
- In an episode of Family Guy, supporting character Glenn Quagmire launches into a tirade regarding reasons he doesn't like main character Brian Griffin. One such reason is that he believes Brian is the sort to lecture a woman with a “7th-grade interpretation” of The Catcher in the Rye and to proclaim Holden Caulfield as a “profound intellectual", while Quagmire actually perceives Caulfield as a “spoiled brat". Quagmire then compares Brian to Caulfield, believing that the reason Brian tries to paint Caulfield in a positive light is because both are pretentious.
- In 2017 the Criminal Minds episode "False Flag" (S13: E9) was based around Catcher in the Rye, a book important to members of the Truther’s community in Roswell, New Mexico.
- Carrie (miniseries) features the book in its first episode being the first book Carrie reads in school. The themes of alienation in Catcher in the Rye are similar to the themes in the show.

== Books ==
The Catcher in the Rye has had significant cultural influence, and works inspired by the novel have been said to form their own genre. Sarah Graham assessed works influenced by The Catcher in the Rye to include the novels Less than Zero by Bret Easton Ellis, The Perks of Being a Wallflower by Stephen Chbosky, A Complicated Kindness by Miriam Toews, The Bell Jar by Sylvia Plath, Ordinary People by Judith Guest, and the film Igby Goes Down by Burr Steers.

- John Fowles's 1963 novel The Collector uses The Catcher in the Rye as "one of the most brilliant examples of adolescence" in popular culture, possibly under a moral light. In it, Miranda encourages her kidnapper Clegg to read Catcher, thinking he might relate to Holden's alienation. However, Clegg finds Holden's actions unrealistic given Holden's wealth and status, and "[doesn't] see much point in it." In the film adaptation of The Collector, this conversation and Clegg's attitude toward the novel and popular culture is subdued. The novel has itself been linked to several serial killers.
- Finnish author Anna-Leena Härkönen's debut novel How to Kill a Bull (Häräntappoase, 1984) is largely influenced by J. D. Salinger's work, also causing a lot of controversy with its bold content.
- Alberto Fuguet's first novel Mala onda (Bad Vibes, 1991), which is set in Santiago, Chile three months before the John Lennon assassination, references The Catcher in the Rye extensively. Like Holden, Matías Vicuña (the 17-year-old narrator and protagonist of the novel) is a cynical, alienated, upper-class teenager who feels fed-up with the blandness of his friends and family. After reading Salinger's book, Matías feels a special connection with Holden. He attempts to replicate Holden's self-inflicted isolation by fleeing home and locking himself up in a hotel room, and he even purchases a red hunting hat to complete the persona.
- Lawrence Block wrote a novel called Burglar in the Rye (1999) in his series on burglar Bernie Rhodenbarr. The plot focuses on an auction of a reclusive writer's letters, and Bernie works to track down the character based on J. D. Salinger.
- In Galt Niederhoffer's novel A Taxonomy of Barnacles (2005), Bridget and Billy think about Holden's question as to the whereabouts of ducks during winter.
- John David California wrote 60 Years Later: Coming Through the Rye (2009), an unauthorized sequel in which seventy-six-year-old Holden escapes a retirement home for a journey in New York.
- In Stephen King's novel Finders Keepers, a reclusive author is murdered by an obsessed fan who steals a trunkful of unpublished writings, reminiscent of the (unfounded) belief that Salinger had never stopped writing.

== Comic strips and magazines ==
- The Frazz character Caulfield is named after Holden.
- In issue #5 of the Marvel Comics character Daredevil's story arc Guardian Devil, Bullseye the villain quotes Catcher in the Rye during the fight with Daredevil.

== Music ==
- The Ataris' song "If You Really Want to Hear About It" from their album End is Forever takes its title from the novel's opening sentence. The final lines paraphrase those of the book with "Don't ever tell anyone anything or else you'll wind up missing everybody." Several other specific references are made within the lyrics.
- Billy Joel's "We Didn't Start the Fire" mentions the novel as a historic item of note during his lifetime.
- Green Day's "Who Wrote Holden Caulfield?" from their album Kerplunk (1991) is named after and is about the novel's main character, Holden Caulfield. Frontman Billie Joe Armstrong recalled being forced to read the novel in high school and despising it. He later reread it as an adult, because it was seen as "punk rock".
- Screeching Weasel's "I Wrote Holden Caulfield" from their album How to Make Enemies and Irritate People is named after the novel's main character, Holden Caulfield and written in response to Green Day's "Who Wrote Holden Caulfield?".
- Pencey Prep was a band from New Jersey formed by Frank Iero. The name of the band is a reference to the school Holden Caulfield goes to in the book, Pencey Prep.
- SLATE.’s song “catcher in the rye.” from his 2021 2-track single “STATIC chiffon.” deals with similar themes of loneliness and modern social isolation. It also takes its own spin on Holden’s dream of being the catcher in the rye by saving kids from jumping off the cliff to their death.
- Guns N' Roses' album Chinese Democracy contains a song titled "Catcher In The Rye".
- The original demo version of "Dead Mom" from Beetlejuice (musical) includes the line, "This carousel of painted ponies spins around filled up with phonies," a reference to the carousel in the penultimate chapter and Holden's disdain for phonies.
- In the music video for the 2018-song Play It Cool by Girli a guy can be seen reading the novel.
- Swedish group Ace of Base refer the book in two of their songs: “no catcher in the rye can help you from yourself” (“Life Is a Flower”) and “Like a catcher in the rye he nags till you die” (“No Good Lover”).
- Streetlight Manifesto's song "Here's to Life" mentions Holden Caulfield being the narrator's drinking buddy, and later on in the song Salinger is mentioned as well.

== Video games ==
- Life Is Strange – The main protagonist of the game, Max Caulfield, is named after Holden Caulfield. She also owns a poster resembling the original cover of The Catcher in the Rye, and she comments "Only a total phony would wear a hat like that" when inspecting a red hunting hat.
- Bully – The main protagonist of the game, Jimmy Hopkins, is sent to live at a disreputable boarding school while his mother and stepfather enjoy a yearlong cruise around the world. Jimmy's first words after being dropped off are "Mom, why did you have to marry that phony?", a term often associated with Catcher in the Rye. One of the in-game clothes shops also has a hunting cap akin to Holden Caulfield's available for purchase.
- Azur Lane – The character Z23 has a purchasable outfit called: "The Eyecatch in the Rye?" In the artwork that comes with the outfit, she is shown picking out books.
