= Teddy (story) =

Short story by J. D. Salinger

- Short story by J. D. Salinger
- Country: United States
- Language: English

Publication
- Published in: The New Yorker
- Publication type: Magazine
- Publication date: January 31, 1953

"Teddy" is a short story by J. D. Salinger, completed on November 22, 1952, and originally published in the January 31, 1953, issue of The New Yorker. Under the influence of The Gospel of Sri Ramakrishna, Salinger created an engaging child character, Teddy McArdle, to introduce to his readership some of the basic concepts of Zen enlightenment and Vedanta reincarnation – a task that Salinger recognized would require overcoming some 1950s American cultural chauvinism.

Salinger wrote "Teddy" while he was arranging publication for a number of his short stories and crafted the story to balance and contrast the collections' intended opening work "A Perfect Day for Bananafish".

In Salinger's novella, "Seymour: An Introduction", a meditation written by a member of the fictional Glass family, Buddy Glass about his brother, Seymour, Buddy claims authorship to "Teddy" as well as other pieces in Nine Stories.

== Summary ==
The story comprises several vignettes which take place aboard a luxury liner. The events occur roughly between 10:00 and 10:30 am on October 28, 1952.

Teddy is Theodore "Teddy" McArdle, a 10-year-old mystic-savant returning home to America with his entertainer-socialite parents and his younger sister. As part of their tour of Great Britain, Teddy has been interviewed as an academic curiosity by professors of religious and philosophical studies - the "Leidekker examining group" - from various European universities in order to test his claims of advanced spiritual enlightenment.

The first scene opens in the McArdles' stateroom. Teddy is standing on his father’s expensive suitcase, peering out of the porthole. Mr. McArdle, apparently hung-over, is attempting to verbally assert control over his son; Mrs. McArdle indulges the boy as a provocative counterpoint to her husband’s bullying: neither adult has any real effect on the child's behavior.

Responding to his parents' outbursts impassively, he contemplates the nature of existence and physical permanence while observing fragments of orange peel that have been discarded overboard. The concepts that the preternatural child ponders are evidently derived from Zen and Vedantic religious philosophy, and suggest that Teddy possesses advanced enlightenment or God-consciousness. When Teddy conveys his spiritual insights to his father and mother, they interpret them merely as the products of his precociousness, eliciting annoyance or indifference from the adults.

Teddy is ordered to retrieve his six-year-old sister, Booper, who has absconded to the sport deck with her father’s expensive camera, which Teddy - indifferent to its material value - has bestowed upon her as a plaything. As he departs, Teddy delivers a short, cryptic caveat to his parents, informing them that they may never see him again outside the realm of memory.

On the Main Deck, Teddy has a brief encounter with one of the ship's female officers, Ensign Mathewson. Forthright and exacting, the boy questions the officer and obtains information about a shipboard word game competition - and disabuses the bemused woman as to her misapprehensions regarding his advanced intellectual development.

Teddy proceeds to the Sport Deck and locates his little sister, Booper, at play with another young passenger. Booper is a domineering and hateful child, contrasting sharply with her older brother's equanimity. Teddy, with firmness, politely exhorts the girl to return with the camera to the cabin and report to their mother. Ignoring his sister’s verbal ripostes, he reminds her to meet him shortly for their swimming lesson at the swimming pool. She submits with bad grace as he departs.

The final scene takes place on the Sun Deck, where Teddy, reclining on one of his family's reserved deckchairs, reviews his recent diary entries. The document has been conscientiously edited and neatly written. It contains reminders to foster better relations with his father; commentary on a letter from a Professor of Literature; a list of vocabulary words to study and notes on his meditation schedule - all matters of self-improvement. While making his daily entry, he writes the following non sequitur: “It will either happen today or February 14, 1958 when I am sixteen. It is ridiculous to mention it even.”

Teddy is interrupted by a passenger named Bob Nicholson, a graduate of an unnamed university, who teaches curriculum and instruction. Nicholson is on a first name basis with the Leidekker group and has listened to a taped interview with Teddy, in which he shows a lurid interest. He peppers Teddy with questions on the boy’s commitment to the precepts of Vedantic reincarnation; Teddy remains composed in the face of the young man’s veiled hostility, and provides him with a brief sketch of his discovery of God, his relationships with his parents and his views on Zen philosophy. The boy offers Nicholson an extended metaphor on the nature of logic that challenges the young man’s rational and orthodox commitment to material reality. Teddy, in explaining his position on death and reincarnation gives a hypothetical example describing a series of events at his upcoming swimming lesson in which a fatality occurs: his own.

Teddy disengages from the interview and hurries to his lesson. Nicholson pursues him through the levels of the ship's decks, and as he begins to descend the stairs to the swimming pool, he hears the scream of "a small, female child" emanating from the enclosed walls of the indoor pool. The story ends on this ambiguous note.

== Analysis ==
=== The porthole and the orange peel ===
In the opening scene set in the Mr. and Mrs. McArdle's state room, Salinger presents two facets of Zen enlightenment: "God-consciousness", a profound awareness of "inner spirit", in contrast to material concerns, and secondly, "the notion of impermanence", based on "the Vedantic belief that separate existence is an illusion."

Teddy, perched on a piece of luggage, pokes his head through the open porthole, penetrating figuratively into a zone of enlightenment and sublimity; his body remains in the cabin, where his parents – “materialistic and self-centered” – engage in mildly abusive repartee, issuing petulant and ineffectual commands to their son, who endures them with tolerant detachment. Teddy’s astonishing self-possession is a product of his adherence to Vedantic “philosophy of non-attachment”, enabling him to distinguish between “the world of illusion” – the material world – and “the world of reality”, where “only unity of God is real.”

The boy focuses his attention on some discarded orange peel suspended momentarily on the ocean surface; as they sink out of sight, he engages in solipsistic contemplation. Teddy conveys his revelation to his parents: “After I go out this door, I may only exist in the minds of all my acquaintances…I may be an orange peel.” His mother and father, victims of their spiritual “immaturity”, are incapable of grasping his warning that they may never see him again. Salinger issues this Vedantic premonition to the reader as a clue to Teddy’s fate.

=== Booper ===
The same studied disengagement that characterizes Teddy’s relationship with his parents also informs the “amazing” toleration he exhibits toward his younger sister – a child that biographer Kenneth Slawenski describes as “a cruel little girl” and “perhaps the most vicious child ever discharged by Salinger’s imagination.”

When Booper announces that she “hates everybody in the ocean”, Salinger calls attention to the setting of his story: the sea, with its infinite horizons and indefinite boundaries where his characters drift – a seascape that reflects “the Zen and Vedantic concepts of existence.”

Teddy’s tolerance of his sister is due to his understanding that few reincarnations have contributed to the six-year old’s spiritual development. Booper’s misanthropic persona make plausible her role in the sinister and unsettling denouement at the swimming pool.

=== Bob Nicholson ===
The final vignette occurs on the Sun Deck. Bob Nicholson, a teacher at Trinity College, Dublin, is acquainted with some members of the Leidekker group who examined Teddy; he engages the boy in an ad hoc interview. This serves two purposes in Salinger’s story. First, he functions as a foil to Teddy, posing logical questions challenging the tenets of Vendantic and Zen philosophy. Salinger uses this device to respond to hostile skeptics among his readers. According to Slawenski, Nicholson “embodies the logic that poisons God-consciousness, and he represents the power of the intellect to blind individuals from spiritual truth.”

Nicholson additionally functions as a witness to Teddy’s final discourse on the nature of existence and death, in which the boy formulates the circumstances that might lead to his reincarnation. In a lull in their exchange, Teddy becomes momentarily distracted by an inner voice or vision, and spontaneously recites to Nicholson two haiku by the 17th Century poet Bashō: “Nothing in the voice of the cicada intimates how soon it will die” and “Along this road goes no one, this autumn eve.”

Nicholson, pursuing Teddy to the indoor swimming pool, hears, but does not see, the event that the boy prophesied, providing the reader with tantalizing evidence that leaves the boy's ultimate fate a mystery.

=== The "swimming pool ending" ===
The ending of Salinger’s “Teddy” has been described as “controversial” and “the most widely criticized ending of any story that he ever wrote.”

Salinger thrice provides the reader with intimations of Teddy’s demise: in statements to his parents, in his diary and to Nicholson. This has led readers to interpret the final passage as confirmation of the boy’s premonition i.e. Booper shoves her older brother into the empty concrete pool and screams when she sees the deadly consequences.

Slawenski reports two additional interpretations that might be derived from the final passage. One option is that Teddy “recognizing the threat his sister poses” evades her thrust and pushes her to her death, as act of premeditated murder. A third option is that both children plunge into the empty basin when Teddy carries Booper with him off the precipice – in order to advance her into her next reincarnation. "None of these" says Slawenski, "is very satisfying."

Critics of the story may have targeted the ending for disapproval, rather than engage in a culturally biased critique of Salinger’s foray into Zen philosophy.

Salinger himself regarded the work as “exceptionally Haunting [sic]” and “memorable” yet “unpleasantly controversial” and “thoroughly unsuccessful.”

== Sources ==
- Alexander, Paul. 1999. Salinger: A Biography. Renaissance Books. Los Angeles, CA. ISBN 1-58063-080-4
- Slawenski, Kenneth. 2010. J.D. Salinger: A Life. Random House. New York, NY. ISBN 978-1-4000-6951-4
- Wenke, J.P. 1991. J.D. Salinger: A Study of the Short Fiction. Twayne Publishers. Woodbridge, CT. ISBN 978-0-8057-8334-6
