= Glass family =

Fictional family created by J. D. Salinger

The Glass family is a fictional family appearing in several of J. D. Salinger's short fictions. All but one of the Glass family stories were first published in The New Yorker. They appear in the short story collections Nine Stories, Raise High the Roof Beam, Carpenters and Seymour: An Introduction and Franny and Zooey.

== Members ==
The Glass family, from eldest to youngest:

- Les and Bessie Glass (née Gallagher): Retired vaudeville performers. Les is Australian (mentioned in "Hapworth 16, 1924") and Jewish, and is in the entertainment business. He is not mentioned often in the stories, but is criticized by Seymour in "Hapworth 16, 1924." Bessie, the matriarch, is Irish, and is characterized as consistently worried about the fact that her children are talented and yet largely unable to assimilate into society. They are the parents of the seven children:
- Seymour Glass (February 1917 – March 19, 1948): The eldest, Seymour is featured in Raise High the Roof Beam, Carpenters and Seymour: An Introduction and Franny and Zooey. He is the author of the letter that comprises "Hapworth 16, 1924" and is the main character in "A Perfect Day for Bananafish." Seymour was a spiritual savant and brilliant intellectual, and became a professor at Columbia at 20. Along with his siblings he was a regular star on the radio program It's a Wise Child. He fought in the European Theatre of World War II, and was deeply scarred by the experience. In 1941 he attempts suicide by slitting his wrists, but fails, as described in Raise High the Roof Beam, Carpenters and Seymour: an Introduction. He elopes with Muriel Fedder on June 4, 1942. In "A Perfect Day for Bananafish," he commits suicide while the couple are on a second honeymoon in Florida. Muriel is asleep on the bed beside him at the time. However, in Seymour: An Introduction his younger brother Buddy (who claims authorship of the story) suggests the depiction of Seymour in "A Perfect Day for Bananafish" more closely resembles Buddy than Seymour.
- Webb Gallagher "Buddy" Glass (born 1919): The narrator of Zooey and protagonist in Raise High the Roof Beam, Carpenters and Seymour: An Introduction. It is revealed in the latter that he wrote at least three stories collected in Nine Stories: "A Perfect Day for Bananafish," "Down at the Dinghy" and "Teddy." He also claims credit for "Franny," and it is suggested in Seymour that he wrote The Catcher in the Rye. Buddy is often considered to be Salinger's alter ego. He lives in upstate New York and teaches English at a rural women's college. He also volunteers his time to instruct some of the faculty of his college in Mahayana Buddhism. Buddy and Seymour were born only two years apart, spent most of their youths living together, and were very close before Seymour's suicide in 1948.
- Beatrice "Boo Boo" Glass Tannenbaum (born 1920): Married, mother of three children, appears centrally in "Down at the Dinghy," is mentioned in "Hapworth 16, 1924," and is often referenced in Raise High the Roof Beam, Carpenters as the "seafaring" sibling currently occupying the New York apartment where much of the story's action takes place. She "modestly prefers to be referred to as a Tuckahoe homemaker."
- Walter F. "Walt" Glass (1921 – 1945): The twin brother of Waker Glass. He was an American soldier who died in Occupied Japan in late fall of 1945, at the age of 24, when a stove he was packaging exploded, an event that Buddy Glass refuses to address. Walt is described by his girlfriend in "Uncle Wiggily in Connecticut." He was also described in "Franny and Zooey" as being the only truly "lighthearted" son in the family.
- Waker Glass (born 1921): The twin brother, born twelve minutes after Walter. A Roman Catholic monk of the Carthusian order. Little is known about Waker, because, though he is mentioned in many of the stories, none have been written specifically about him. It is known that Waker took part in a "conscientious objectors' camp in Maryland".
- Zachary Martin "Zooey" Glass (born 1929): Title character of Zooey, in which he is 25 years old. He is an actor, and (according to himself) the most attractive of all the children. Zooey also says that he and Buddy were "too clever" for their own good. Boo Boo describes Zooey as "the blue-eyed Jewish-Irish Mohican scout who died in your arms at the roulette table at Monte Carlo." He is portrayed as being rather arrogant and particularly insensitive to his mother, Bessie, frequently swearing at her and calling her "fatty." He is misanthropic, which he attributes to Seymour and Buddy's imposition of their college-age infatuation with Eastern mysticism on him and Franny as children.
- Frances "Franny" Glass (born 1934): The title character of Franny, in which she is a 20-year-old college student and actress. In Franny and Zooey, she is depicted reading The Way of a Pilgrim, an anonymous Orthodox Christian classic, which contributes to her spiritual and emotional breakdown.

All the children are precocious, and appeared on fictional radio quiz show It's a Wise Child, which, according to the stories, sent all seven Glass children through college. At least one of the children appeared on the show from 1927 to 1943, beginning with Seymour and Buddy. "Raise High the Roof Beam, Carpenters" says that each child appeared on the show under a pseudonym as the Black children. Seymour was known as Billy Black, and Walt was Georgie Black.

The Glass family lives in New York City; the children spent most of their childhood in an apartment on the Upper East Side.

== Glass Family Appearances ==
- "A Perfect Day for Bananafish" (The New Yorker, January 22, 1948; reprinted in Nine Stories)
- "Uncle Wiggily in Connecticut" (The New Yorker, March 20, 1948; reprinted in Nine Stories)
- "Down at the Dinghy" (Harper's, April 1949; reprinted in Nine Stories)
- "Franny" (The New Yorker, January 29, 1955; reprinted in Franny and Zooey)
- "Raise High the Roof Beam, Carpenters" (The New Yorker, November 19, 1955; reprinted in Raise High the Roof Beam, Carpenters and Seymour: An Introduction)
- "Zooey" (The New Yorker, May 1, 1957; reprinted in Franny and Zooey)
- "Seymour: An Introduction" (The New Yorker, June 6, 1959; reprinted in Raise High the Roof Beam, Carpenters and Seymour: An Introduction)
- “Hapworth 16, 1924” (The New Yorker, June 19, 1965)
