= Just Before the War with the Eskimos =

Short story by J. D. Salinger

"Just Before the War with the Eskimos" is a short story by J. D. Salinger originally published in the June 5, 1948, issue of The New Yorker. It was anthologized in Salinger's 1953 collection Nine Stories, and reprinted for Bantam in Manhattan: Stories from the Heart of a Great City in 1954. It is a tale of adolescent alienation and redemption in a post-World War II setting. It focuses primarily on 15-year-old Ginnie Mannox's meeting with her classmate Selena Graff's older brother, Franklin.

Poet and New Yorker editor Dorothy Parker called the story "urbane, clever, and absolutely well-written". At the time of its publication, it confused but delighted its audience.

== Plot summary ==
This story begins with an argument between high school classmates Ginnie Mannox and Selena Graff, who both attend Miss Basehoar’s school in Manhattan. Ginnie confronts Selena about Selena’s habit of leaving Ginnie to pick up the cab fare after the two play tennis each Saturday. Selena tries to explain to Ginnie that her mother has pneumonia and that Selena would rather bring the money to class later, but Ginnie insists that Selena reimburse her immediately. This dispute takes the two girls to Selena’s apartment, where Selena goes inside to get money from her mother, leaving Ginnie in the living room alone.

Most of the narrative follows Ginnie’s conversation with Franklin, Selena’s irreverent older brother, whom Ginnie meets while Selena is inside. Ginnie appears repulsed by Franklin, who slinks into the room wearing pajamas, pressing his hand on a bleeding finger, which he accidentally cut in the bathroom. During their conversation, Franklin reveals that he once met Ginnie’s sister, Joan, and considers her the “Queen of the goddam snobs.” He also mentions that his unexplained heart troubles prohibited him from entering the Army, and that he has been working in an airplane factory for the past thirty-seven months. Because it is lunch time, Franklin offers Ginnie half of his chicken sandwich, and then goes inside to get ready for his friend Eric’s arrival. Eric and Franklin have plans to see Cocteau’s Beauty and the Beast, which Eric considers brilliant. While he is gone, Eric arrives and complains to Ginnie at length about his roommate, who is a writer.

When Selena comes back to the living room with the money, Ginnie insists that Selena keep it. Ginnie also says she may come over later that afternoon, despite previously suggesting that she already had plans for that evening. During her walk to a bus stop, Ginnie considers throwing away the chicken sandwich Franklin gave her, but ultimately decides not to, remembering how it once took her three days to throw away a dead Easter chick.

== Analysis ==
Many critics note the biblical symbolism that appears throughout this story. James E. Bryan argues that Franklin can be viewed as a Christ figure, in the same manner as the Fat Lady from Salinger’s Franny and Zooey, for Franklin is literally bleeding when Ginnie first meets him. Ginnie’s eventual acceptance of Franklin’s chicken sandwich, associated with her inability to discard a dead Easter chick, serves as her symbolic acceptance of Christ.
