= De Daumier-Smith's Blue Period =

Short story by J. D. Salinger

- Short story by J. D. Salinger
- Country: United Kingdom
- Language: English

Publication
- Published in: World Review (London)
- Publication type: Periodical
- Media type: Print (Magazine)
- Publication date: May 1952

"De Daumier-Smith's Blue Period" is a short story by J. D. Salinger, first published in the May 1952 edition of World Review (London). Declined by The New Yorker on November 14, 1951, as the piece was judged too short to adequately address the complex religious concepts that Salinger attempted to convey. It is known that Salinger struggled with writing it for over five months in 1951. While the New Yorker initially declined this story, Salinger still managed to publish Pretty Mouth and Green My Eyes in the July 1951 edition of The New Yorker.

"De Daumier-Smith's Blue Period" was the last Salinger story to have been published outside the pages of The New Yorker, it was later included in his 1953 collection Nine Stories.

== Summary ==
The point of view is that of first-person narrator John Smith who, as an adult, is reassessing an episode in his life when he was nineteen. He dedicates the story to his late (fictional) stepfather.

The events unfold shortly after the death of Smith's mother in 1939, when he and his stepfather return to Manhattan from Paris, where the family had spent the Great Depression years. As housemates, the "exceptionally unpleasant" Smith and his "live-and-let-live" widower stepfather are incompatible developing an Alphonse and Gaston relationship. Seeking escape, Smith applies for, and is accepted, as an instructor at a Montreal correspondence art academy, "Les Amis des Vieux Maîtres" ("Friends of the Old [Art] Masters") operated by Monsieur I. Yoshoto. Smith's résumé overstates his artistic credentials and, further, he falsely claims to be a descendant of Honoré Daumier and a confidant of Pablo Picasso. He adopts the inflated moniker "Jean de Daumier-Smith" and increasingly internalizes his own contrived persona.

"Les Amis des Vieux Maîtres" turns out to be Yoshoto's tiny apartment, located in Verdun, a rundown section of Montreal. Mr. Yoshoto, his wife and Smith are the only "instructors" at the correspondence art "academy". Mr. Yoshoto assigns his new employee the task of reviewing and correcting the work of three correspondence students, two of whose crude and inept artwork dismays Smith. The work of the third student, a nun, Sister Irma, intrigues and delights Smith. In his enthusiasm, he pens an officious and patronizing letter of encouragement to the woman. Smith's intervention on the sister's behalf leads to the convent banning further communications with Sister Irma, ending her enrollment at the academy.

This rebuff stuns the young man and deepens his egotistical isolation. He summarily dismisses his four remaining students from the school, disparaging their work. To Sister Irma he writes a letter warning that her artistic talent will never flourish without proper schooling but never sends it.

In this alienated state, Smith experiences a transcendental revelation while looking into a display window of an orthopedic appliances store. In an instant, he grasps the intrinsic beauty of the prosaic objects he beholds. Smith begins to emerge from his disturbed existence. He writes a note in his diary, ceding to Sister Irma the power to pursue her destiny. He declares that "'Everyone is a nun' (tout le monde est une nonne.)" He finally reinstates his four pupils, but the academy is soon after shut down for being unlicensed. However, he maintains a long term relationship with one of them.

== Analysis ==
"De Daumier-Smith's Blue Period" marks a shift in Salinger's fiction towards subjects that contrast religious or mystical experiences with the spiritual emptiness of American society. John Smith is described as an extremely lonely and alienated young man whose narcissism (he admits to painting seventeen self-portraits) and pretentiousness serve to insulate himself from his own suffering. The protagonist ultimately transcends his self-absorption and misanthropy through epiphanies that reveal to him the presence of God.

In his new job as instructor, Smith finds the artwork of two of his students, Bambi Kramer and R. Howard Ridgefield (each described with great humor by Salinger) demoralizing to the point of despondency. His third student, a devout nun from the order of the Sisters of St. Joseph, offers hope. She submits a painting depicting the burial of Christ. Astonished by her talent, Smith writes a gushing and intrusive letter to her that is as inept as the crude artistic offerings of his other pupils.

Commencing with this encounter between the nun and the young man, Salinger introduces the central theme in the story: intuitive understanding of life versus intellectual knowledge. This marks the beginning of the young man's advance towards self-enlightenment.

=== The Two Epiphanies ===
After posting his letter to Sister Irma, Smith undergoes the first of his two "near-mystical experiences". Biographer Kenneth Slawenski describes the first of these episodes:

The first is muted and is a chilling insight into his own alienation that brings him to the point of collapse. After taking a walk one night, he is drawn to the lighted display window of the orthopedic-appliance shop on the ground floor of the school building. As he gazes at the contents on exhibit – enamel bedpans and urinals overseen by a wooden dummy wearing a rupture truss – he experiences an abrupt stripping away of his ego that reveals his alienation [and] recognizes that he is spiritually unconscious, with no connection to the divine inspiration that true art requires or true living demands. His art is polluted by ego.

Smith reacts to this epiphany by indulging in adolescent romantic fantasies involving Sister Irma. He clings to the illusions of his superiority.

Smith's second epiphany occurs at the same display window, but Salinger presents a tableau that includes a young woman who is rearranging the objects on display. Absorbed in dressing the display mannequin, she becomes momentarily flustered when she notices Smith observing her intently, then slips and falls. She picks herself up and resumes her humble task with dignity. The girl corresponds to Sister Irma and her simple occupation is equated with the nun's genuine dedication to God. Salinger describes the moment of the narrator's epiphany:

Suddenly… the sun came up and sped toward the bridge of my nose at the rate of ninety-three million miles a second. Blinded and very frightened, I had to put my hand on the glass to keep my balance. When I got my sight back, the girl had gone from the window, leaving behind her a shimmering field of exquisite, twice-blessed, enamel flowers.

Slawenski regards this as the key passage in the story, revealing "the presence of God", and the emergence of Zen Buddhist topics in Salinger's writing.

== Notes ==
=== Sources ===
- Slawenski, Kenneth. J. D. Salinger: A Life. Random House, New York 2010. ISBN 978-1-4000-6951-4.
