= A Perfect Day for Bananafish =

Short story by J. D. Salinger

"A Perfect Day for Bananafish" is a short story by J. D. Salinger, originally published in the January 31, 1948, issue of The New Yorker. It was anthologized in 1949's 55 Short Stories from The New Yorker, as well as in Salinger's 1953 collection Nine Stories. The story is an enigmatic examination of a young married couple, Muriel and Seymour Glass, on vacation in Florida. It is the first of his stories to feature a member of the fictional Glass family.

When the 28-year-old Salinger submitted the manuscript to The New Yorker in January 1947, titled "The Bananafish", its arresting dialogue and precise style were read with interest by fiction editor William Maxwell and his staff, though the point of the story, in this original version, was considered incomprehensible.

At Maxwell's urging, Salinger embarked upon a major reworking of the piece, adding the opening section with Muriel's character, and crafting the material to provide insights into Seymour's tragic demise. In frequent consultation with editor Gus Lobrano, Salinger revised the story numerous times throughout 1947, renaming it "A Fine Day for Bananafish". The New Yorker published the final version as "A Perfect Day for Bananafish" one year after Salinger first submitted the manuscript.

The story met with immediate acclaim, and according to Salinger biographer Paul Alexander, was "the story that would permanently change his standing in the literary community." Salinger's decision to collaborate with Maxwell and The New Yorker staff in developing the story marked a major advance in his career and led to his entry into the echelon of elite writers at the journal. The story has been compared to F. Scott Fitzgerald's "May Day."

== Plot summary ==
The story is set at a large seaside resort in Florida. Muriel Glass, a wealthy and self-absorbed woman, phones her mother from her suite to discuss her husband Seymour, a World War II combat veteran recently discharged from an army hospital; it is implied that he was being evaluated for a psychiatric disorder. Muriel's mother is concerned by reports of her son-in-law's increasingly bizarre and anti-social actions, and warns her daughter that the doctor said he may "lose control of himself". Muriel dismisses her remarks as hyperbole, regarding her husband's idiosyncrasies as benign and manageable.

Meanwhile, at the resort's adjoining beach, a child named Sybil Carpenter has been left unsupervised by her mother so that she may drink at the hotel bar. Sybil wanders on the beach and finds Seymour, lying in solitude a quarter-mile from the hotel. Sybil reproaches Seymour for allowing another little girl, Sharon Lipschutz, to sit with him the previous night as he played the lounge piano for the hotel's guests. Seymour attempts to placate Sybil by suggesting they "catch a Bananafish", but Sybil insists that Seymour choose between her and Sharon Lipschutz. Seymour responds that he observed Sybil abusing a hotel patron's dog, and the girl falls silent.

Seymour places Sybil on a rubber raft and wades into the water, where he tells her the story of "the very tragic life" of the bananafish: they gorge themselves on bananas, become too large to escape their feeding holes, and die. Sybil is unfazed by the story, and claims that she sees a bananafish with six bananas in its mouth. Seymour affectionately kisses the arch of one of her feet, and returns her to shore, where she departs.

Once alone, and returning to the hotel, Seymour becomes less affable. He starts a baseless argument with a woman in an elevator, accusing her of staring at his feet and calling her a "god-damned sneak". He returns to his hotel room, where his wife is taking a nap. He retrieves a pistol from his luggage and shoots himself.

== Background on publication and style ==
Before publication of the story, Salinger had reworked the details in a meeting with Maxwell. Originally, the story consisted merely of Seymour's incident on the beach with Sybil Carpenter and the subsequent suicide. Maxwell argued that there was no clear explanation for Seymour's killing himself. After meeting with Maxwell, Salinger incorporated the portion of the story with Muriel talking to her mother on the phone. After the triumph of "A Perfect Day for Bananafish", Salinger allowed the New Yorker to have the first chance at printing all his subsequent writing by signing a contract with the magazine.

Despite some differing critical opinion, Salinger's Nine Stories, in which "A Perfect Day for Bananafish" appears, are not separate entities published together. Author Eberhard Alsen, in A Reader’s Guide to J.D Salinger, observes that the stories evolve chronologically. They change in a way that mirrors Salinger's personal life and his experiences with religion. Many scholars and critics have analyzed and reviewed the character of Seymour Glass in regard to his wartime experiences and suicide. Salinger's daughter, Margaret Salinger, recalls her father's stories from World War II and makes a connection between Salinger and Seymour. Author Ron Rosenbaum draws from Margaret Salinger's memories to elicit a connection between Salinger's progression from bleak to optimistic, and the spiritual writing style in Nine Stories.

Salinger was also greatly influenced by Ernest Hemingway's writing style and narration method. Hemingway writes in such a way that the reader has to interpret and draw his or her own conclusions when characters are speaking. The vague description common to Hemingway's narrative dialogue appears in several of Salinger's stories and novels.

== Reception and criticism ==
Though "Slight Rebellion off Madison" was published in the New Yorker and met with acclaim, Salinger continued to face rejection afterward. The New Yorker consistently dismissed further stories he submitted. Unfazed, Salinger continued to submit work to the New Yorker because he believed the magazine's editors would publish more of his stories. After sending the initial draft, "The Bananafish", to the New Yorker, Harold Ober, Salinger's agent, received a letter from William Maxwell, a fiction editor at the magazine. The letter, from January 22, 1947, stated: "We like parts of 'The Bananafish' by J.D. Salinger very much, but it seems to us to lack any discernible story or point. If Mr. Salinger is around town, perhaps he'd like to come in and talk to us about New Yorker stories."

When "A Perfect Day for Bananafish" was first published, its initial reception was favorable. Readers accepted Salinger's novel tone, and "A Perfect Day for Bananafish" popularized Salinger in the literary community.

Much of the criticism of the story involves the character of Seymour Glass, who appears in several other Salinger stories. Critics interpret evidence from the story to determine the cause of Seymour's suicide; conflicting reasons appear in other stories about the Glass family. Some believe the entire world drives Seymour to madness; others draw a connection to post-traumatic stress. According to critic Janet Malcolm, the world portrayed in the story is both tangled and simplified by Salinger. This "dualism" can be found in other works of Salinger, as he repeatedly depicts life "as a battleground between the normal and abnormal, the ordinary and the extraordinary, the talentless and the gifted, the well and the sick."

== Analysis ==
Like the eldest son of the Glass family, Salinger was deeply affected by his experiences as a combat soldier in WWII, and these informed his writing. Kenneth Slawenski reports that Salinger, in his Seymour – An Introduction (1959), confesses that the young man in Bananafish "was not Seymour at all but... myself." Traumatized by the Battle of the Bulge and the Nazi concentration camps, Salinger "found it impossible to fit into a society that ignored the truth that he now knew."

Children figure prominently in Salinger's works. Seymour's sympathetic, affectionate interaction with children is contrasted with the detached and phony behavior of adults. In the aftermath of his interlude with Sybil, Seymour "has drawn his own conclusions regarding the makeup of human beings and the world around him" and commits suicide.

=== T. S. Eliot's The Waste Land and Bananafish ===
Salinger quotes a verse from the poem The Waste Land by poet T. S. Eliot in the following exchange between Seymour and Sybil, regarding the little girl's young rival, Sharon Lipschutz:

"Ah, Sharon Lipschutz", said the young man. "How that name comes up. Mixing memory and desire." He suddenly got to his feet. He looked at the ocean. "Sybil," he said, "I'll tell you what we'll do. We'll see if we can catch a bananafish."

"A what?"

"A bananafish," he said... [emphasis added]

The stanza that contains the verse is from Section I of The Waste Land – "The Burial of the Dead":

April is the cruelest month, breeding
Lilacs out of the dead land, mixing
Memory and desire, stirring
Dull roots with spring rain. [emphasis added]

"The Burial of the Dead" begins with an excerpt from Petronius Arbiter's Satyricon, which reads: "For once I saw with my own eyes the Cumean Sibyl hanging in a jar, and when the boys asked her, 'Sibyl, what do you want?' she answered, 'I want to die.'"

Slawenski argues that Salinger's choice of the name Sybil for the little girl establishes an "unmistakable" correlation between Eliot's depiction of the Cumaean Sybil of Greek myth and Seymour's story of the bananafish. The bananafish are "doomed by greed" and thus share the fate of Eliot's Sybil, "cursed by relentless existence."

== See also ==
- Glass family
