= John David California =

Swedish book publisher

- Born: Fredrik Colting; Sweden
- Occupations: Book publisher, writer

John David California was the pseudonym used by Swedish book publisher Fredrik Colting when on 7 May 2009 he published 60 Years Later: Coming Through the Rye in the United Kingdom.

The book was presented as a sequel to The Catcher in the Rye by J. D. Salinger, with Salinger's antihero Holden Caulfield now a 76-year-old man on the run from a nursing home.

Salinger, who died in January 2010, was in the process of suing Colting for copyright infringement, and had succeeded in getting a court order which indefinitely bans the publication, advertising or distribution of the book in the United States.

Before and during the UK launch, Colting claimed that J. D. California was a "Swedish-American" author, and presented the book as a sequel. However, when his lawyers submitted a "defendants' memorandum" to a federal court in Manhattan on 15 June 2009, this memorandum claimed that the novel is a legally protected commentary and parody of The Catcher in the Rye, and not an unauthorized sequel. An 18 June article presented Colting's view that the book is a piece of literary criticism on Salinger and his Caulfield character.

In a review of the book, Richard Davies suggests that it "comes across as fan fiction", calling it "harmless nonsense" with "none of the edginess that still oozes from The Catcher in the Rye".
