= Holden Caulfield =

Character from The Catcher in the Rye

- An interpretation of Holden Caulfield on the cover of the 2012 book The Catcher in the Rye and Philosophy by Heather Salter and Keith Dromm.
- First appearance: "I'm Crazy" (1945)
- Last appearance: The Catcher in the Rye (1951)
- Created by: J. D. Salinger

In-universe information
- Gender: Male
- Family: D. B. Caulfield (brother); Phoebe Caulfield (sister); Allie Caulfield (deceased brother); Unnamed Parents
- Nationality: Irish-American

Holden Caulfield (identified as "Holden Morrisey Caulfield" in the story "Slight Rebellion Off Madison", and "Holden V. Caulfield" in The Catcher in the Rye) is a fictional character in the works of author J. D. Salinger. He is most famous for his appearance as the antihero protagonist and narrator of the 1951 novel The Catcher in the Rye. Since the book's publication, Holden has become an icon for teenage rebellion and angst, and is considered among the most important characters of 20th-century American literature. The name Holden Caulfield was initially used in an unpublished short story written in 1941 and first appeared in print in 1945.

Salinger's various stories (and one novel) featuring a character named Holden Caulfield do not share a cohesive timeline, and details about "Holden Caulfield" and his family are often inconsistent or completely contradictory from one story to another. Most notably, in some Salinger short stories "Holden Caulfield" is a soldier in World War II who was missing in action in 1944—something incompatible with the 16-year-old Holden Caulfield of The Catcher in the Rye, which is set in 1948 or 1949.

Salinger's first published Holden Caulfield story, "I'm Crazy", appeared in Collier's on December 22, 1945. It is sometimes mistakenly reported that the name "Holden Caulfield" was derived by Salinger from a marquee or poster for the film Dear Ruth, starring William Holden and Joan Caulfield, but Dear Ruth was released in 1947, more than a year-and-a-half after Holden Caulfield's first appearance in print, and more than six years after Salinger's first unpublished short story was written using this name for a character.

== In The Catcher in the Rye ==
Holden Caulfield is the narrator and main character of The Catcher in the Rye. The novel recounts Holden's week in New York City during Christmas break, circa 1948/1949, following his expulsion from Pencey Prep, a preparatory school in Pennsylvania based loosely on Salinger's alma mater Valley Forge Military Academy. Holden Caulfield tells his story with surprising honesty from a sanatorium in California in a cynical and jaded language.

== In other works ==
Several early pieces featuring Holden Caulfield formed the basis of parts of Catcher in the Rye, but were rewritten for the novel.

The character, as Holden Caulfield, appears in Salinger's "Slight Rebellion off Madison", published in the December 21, 1946, issue of The New Yorker. An earlier version of this story, titled "Are You Banging Your Head Against a Wall?" was accepted for publication by The New Yorker in October 1941, but was not published then because editors found the tone to be too desolate for its readership. An edited version of this short story later became the basis of several chapters in the middle-late section of The Catcher in the Rye dealing with Caulfield's date with Sally Hayes, during which he confesses his desire to run away with her, meets Carl Luce for drinks, and makes a drunken phone call to the Hayes' home. Unlike the similar sequence in the novel, Caulfield is on a Christmas break from school, and, in the story, the interlude with Sally is split into two occurrences. Also, the meeting with Carl Luce is considerably briefer in the story than in the novel.

Caulfield also figures as a character in the short story "I'm Crazy", published in Collier's (December 22, 1945), and other members of the Caulfield family are featured in "Last Day of the Last Furlough", published in The Saturday Evening Post (July 15, 1944) and the unpublished short stories "The Last and Best of the Peter Pans" (c. 1942) and "The Ocean Full of Bowling Balls" (c. 1945). "I'm Crazy" is closely related to the first chapter of The Catcher in the Rye. It begins with Caulfield standing on a hill at Pencey Prep watching a football game below, and develops as Holden visits his history teacher, Mr. Spencer, for a talk about his expulsion from school and his future. Several other details match those found in the first chapter of The Catcher in the Rye, including a reference to the mother of one of Caulfield's schoolmates and to his own mother sending him a gift of ice skates. Still, the story ends with his returning home instead of running away from school. Once home, he is not shown confronting his parents, who, according to the maid, are playing bridge. Instead, he goes to speak to Phoebe. Their dialogue is similar to that which appears in the later chapters of The Catcher in the Rye. The other notable feature of the story is that his sister Viola gets her first, and only, mention in the Caulfield saga.

"This Sandwich Has No Mayonnaise" (Esquire, 1945) has a mention of Holden missing in action during the war.

== Caulfield family, in other works ==
"Last Day of the Last Furlough" relates the final day of Babe Gladwaller before he leaves to fight in World War II. Gladwaller spends part of the day with his little sister before Vincent Caulfield arrives. At that point, Vincent is a fellow soldier about to leave for the war. Vincent announces that his brother, Holden, has been declared missing in action. There is some ambiguity here because Holden is both alive and a high school student in Catcher, which was written and published after the war, so he can't have been a soldier during the 1940s and a high school student in the early 50s.

It is unclear how many Caulfield children there are and who is who. For instance, many have speculated that Holden's brother, D.B., is actually Vincent. However, Salinger wrote that Vincent died in World War II, and The Catcher in the Rye was published in 1951. At that time, D.B. is alive and working as a writer in Hollywood. Gladwaller's relationship with his younger sister can be seen as a parallel to Caulfield's relationship with Phoebe.

"The Last and Best of the Peter Pans" relates the story of Vincent's draft questionnaire being hidden by his mother. The events occur just after the death of Kenneth (later renamed Allie) and reveal the anxiety of Mary Moriarity, an actress and Caulfield's mother. The story is notable for the appearance of Phoebe and Vincent's statements about a child crawling off a cliff.

In "The Ocean Full of Bowling Balls", Vincent (D.B.) recalls the day his brother Kenneth (Allie) died. The story is set at the Caulfield summer home on Cape Cod. Several details make their way from this story into Catcher, including the characterization of Allie; Allie's poetry-inscribed left-handed baseball mitt; Vincent's girlfriend, Helen, who keeps her kings in the back row (like Jane Gallagher); and Caulfield's critical view of others. While the cause of death in Catcher is leukemia, here it is due to an unspecified heart condition. Toward the end of the story, Kenneth and Vincent are on the beach. Kenneth decides to go swimming and is knocked out by a wave. Holden, just home from camp, is waiting on the porch with his suitcases as Vincent comes back with Kenneth's unconscious body. Kenneth dies later the same night. The story was reportedly sold to a magazine, only to be taken back by Salinger before publication.

Another short story of note with relationship to Caulfield is "The Boy in the People Shooting Hat", which was submitted to The New Yorker sometime between 1948 and 1949, but was never published. It focuses on a fight between two characters named Bobby and Stradlater, over Bobby's feelings about Jane Gallagher. This story appears to form the basis for several key scenes in the first several chapters of The Catcher in the Rye.

In Seymour: An Introduction, a Curtis Caulfield is mentioned in passing as "an exceptionally intelligent and likable boy" who appeared on the same radio show as Seymour and the other Glass children. He is reportedly "killed during one of the landings in the Pacific". It is possible that Vincent is renamed Curtis, as Seymour was published in 1959, and both Curtis and Vincent are killed in the Pacific during World War II. None of Salinger's works to date have clarified exactly how many Caulfield children there were or who (aside from the Kenneth/Allie character) might have been the same person, but simply renamed in a later work.

In "The Stranger", published in Collier's on December 1, 1945, Babe Gladwaller and his sister Mattie (a prototype for Phoebe) visit Vincent Caulfield's former girlfriend, now married, to tell her about his death and deliver a poem he wrote about her.

== Cultural impact ==
Holden Caulfield is one of the most enduring characters in 20th-century American fiction. It has been suggested that Salinger himself related so closely to Holden that he was protective of the character. This was the reason he was unwilling to allow filming of the book or use of the character by other writers.

John Lennon's assassin, Mark David Chapman, was reportedly inspired to commit the murder by Caulfield.

Green Day wrote a song titled "Who Wrote Holden Caulfield?" for their second studio album, Kerplunk (1991), after lead singer and guitarist Billie Joe Armstrong read The Catcher in the Rye. Initially, he gave up on reading it after dropping out of Pinole Valley High School when he was 18 years old.

== See also ==
- List of fictional atheists and agnostics
