= Slight Rebellion off Madison =

Short story by J. D. Salinger

"Slight Rebellion Off Madison"
- Short story by J. D. Salinger
- Country: United States
- Language: English

Publication
- Published in: The New Yorker
- Publication date: 21 December 1946

"Slight Rebellion off Madison" is an uncollected work of short fiction by J. D. Salinger which appeared in the 21 December 1946 issue of The New Yorker.

The story is the first of nine stories to feature Salinger's iconic protagonist Holden Morrisey Caulfield and the Caulfield family.

== Plot ==
The story is a told by an omniscient narrator from a third-person point-of-view.

Holden Caulfield is a prep school student who has arrived home during the Christmas break. He is disaffected and disgusted with campus life and with conventional life in general. He loathes the prospect of performing as a dutiful son to his father and working for the family business. Holden first meets up with Sally to go ice skating. After a bit of small talk with her, Holden reveals his true thoughts about his perceived pointlessness of preparatory school, telling her he's "in bad shape." Holden's rebellious behavior is limited to formulating a scenario by which he and Sally will escape to the country and live a simple life. Sally dismisses this as an absurd fantasy. She counsels Holden to first complete his college degree after which he can enjoy "oodles" of far-flung adventures. Holden calls her a "royal pain" and she departs.

Later, Holden and Carl Luce appear at the Wadsworth bar, where they drink scotch and sodas. Holden addresses Carl as an "intellectual guy" and asks him hypothetically what he would do if he hated school and wanted to "get the hell out of New York". Holden receives a response similar to Sally's, and is dismissed. Alone, Holden drunkenly calls Sally twice on a payphone. Then, after chatting with the piano player at the bar in the bathroom, Holden waits for a bus on the corner of Madison Avenue, with tears in his eyes.

== Publication history ==
"'Slight Rebellion' unlocked a path to creativity that would alter Salinger's life...supply[ing] the avenue along which his career would move until it culminated in The Catcher in the Rye."—Biographer Kenneth Slawenski in J. D. Salinger: A Life (2010)

"Slight Rebellion off Madison" was completed during a two-week sojourn at Beekman Tower hotel during August 1941. Originally titled "The Lovely Dead Girl at Table Number Six", Salinger had been working on the story for the past year. The story is notable for being the first work to present Salinger's iconic character Holden Morrisey Caulfield, the future protagonist of his 1951 novel The Catcher in the Rye. The public, however, first saw mentions of Holden as Vincent Caufield's missing-in-action brother in "This Sandwich Has No Mayonnaise", which was published in the October 1945 issue of Esquire magazine; and two months later, readers were given more insight into Holden's character in "I'm Crazy", published in the December 1945 issue of Collier's magazine.

The first of Salinger's many stories to be published by The New Yorker, the piece was withheld from the journal's December 1941 issue. Due to the gravity of Japan's attack at Pearl Harbor on December 7, 1941, and the immediate entry of the United States into World War II, Salinger's story of "dissatisfied upper-class youths" was deemed contrary to the country's wartime mood.

In the summer of 1943, The New Yorker indicated that "Slight Rebellion" would appear in its Christmas edition, but insisted that the story be shortened due to space considerations, to which Salinger consented. Despite the alteration, the story was ultimately cut from the issue.

This experience contributed to Salinger's sense of betrayal, and served to deepen his "suspicion of editorial methods and motives for the rest of his career." "Slight Rebellion off Madison" would not appear in the journal until after the end of the war, on December 21, 1946.

== Critical assessment ==
Biographer Kenneth Slawenki notes that Holden's denunciations of social conventions take the form of "a scotch-drenched litany" whose "vehemence and self-derision" exceeds the expressions of disaffection that appear in 'The Catcher in the Rye (1951). Literary critic John Wenke questions the scale of Holden's rhetoric with respect to the objects of his scorn:

"His repugnance is all-encompassing: it lacks antecedents and seems too excessive for the actual circumstances of this story."

Slawenski draws a distinction between the two Holdens:

Although "Slight Rebellion on Madison" contains characters and events familiar to readers of The Catcher in the Rye, its tone and feel are foreign to it. The Holden Caulfield of Catcher and the Holden Caulfield of "Slight Rebellion" are driven by different motivations, a difference that changes not only the story's characters but also its primary message."

Significantly, Holden's experiences in the short story are delivered in the third person, rather than the first-person narration in Catcher, leaving the protagonist "far removed from the reader."

== Theme ==
The Holden Caulfield of "Slight Rebellion" exposes the pathetic disorientation of "an individual trapped by the limitations of his own experience." The story, with its autobiographical elements, reveals the dichotomy that characterized Salinger's outlook before 1942. Indeed, "Salinger aligns himself so closely to Holden Caulfield as to cast his own spirit within the main character." Kenneth Slawenski writes:

Though Salinger may have devoted his writing to exposing and parodying the emptiness of upper-class Manhattan society, it was the only world he knew…While Holden Caulfield decries the falseness of trendy society, his creator was sitting in the Stork Club, entertaining a life of pretension and craving the very things he reviled in print.

Holden's desperate and absurd scheme is a "confession" of the professional and personal contradictions that plagued Salinger in his early 20s. Literary critic John Wenke writes:

His solution is to fashion an escape-to-nature fantasy that, ironically, would culminate in marriage to Sally…She wrestles Holden's absurd plan into a pragmatic and level-headed deferral…she replaces his escape wish with a guided tour. Holden's admission that '[i]t would be the same at all' reflects his inability to imagine himself taking part in the commonplace activities of life."

The "playacting" in which Holden indulges, including a mock electric-chair execution, prefigures similar enactments of death that appear in The Catcher in the Rye (1951).

== Sources ==
- Hamiton, Ian. 1988. In Search of J. D. Salinger. Random House, 1988. ISBN 978-0571269273
- Slawenski, Kenneth. 2010. J. D. Salinger: A Life. Random House, New York. ISBN 978-1-4000-6951-4
- Wenke, John. 1991. J. D. Salinger: A Study of the Short Fiction. Twaynes Studies in Short Fiction, Gordon Weaver, General Editor. Twayne Publishers, New York. ISBN 0-8057-8334-2
