= E. Michael Mitchell =

Canadian artist (1920–2009)

- Mitchell in an undated photograph
- Born: 1920; Toronto, Ontario, Canada
- Died: September 6, 2009 (aged 89)
- Education: OCAD University
- Known for: The Catcher in the Rye dust jacket design

E. Michael Mitchell (1920 – September 6, 2009) was a Canadian painter, illustrator, and instructor. He was a close associate of author J. D. Salinger and designed the original dust jacket illustration for Salinger's 1951 novel, The Catcher in the Rye.

== Biography ==
=== Early life ===
Mitchell was born in Toronto, Ontario. He initially intended to pursue professional ice hockey before committing to a career in visual arts, studying at OCAD University. During World War II, Mitchell enlisted in the Royal Air Force as a teenager and flew combat missions over the United Kingdom during the Blitz and over German-occupied Europe. Following his military service, for which he was decorated, Mitchell expressed a strong aversion to media publicity.

=== Career ===
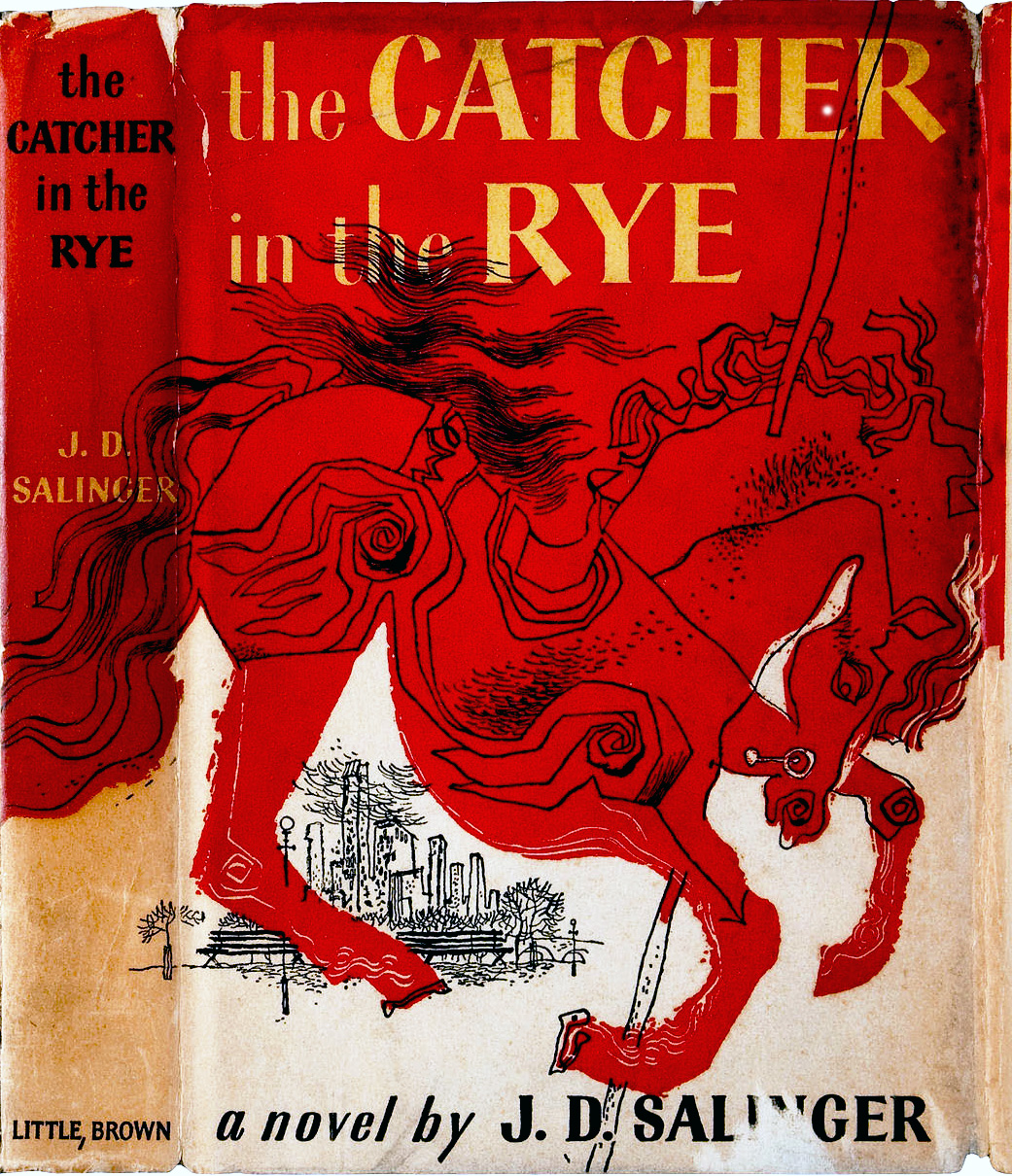
Mitchell worked with J.D. Salinger to create the dust jacket cover art of The Catcher in the Rye.

By the late 1940s, Mitchell had relocated from Toronto to the United States. He worked as a commercial illustrator, contributing artwork to major periodicals including Cosmopolitan, Collier's, Maclean's, and Woman's Day. His illustrations first appeared in Cosmopolitan in June 1948, coinciding with early publications of Salinger's short fiction in the same periodical.

In 1950, Mitchell lived in Westport, Connecticut, near Salinger. During this period, Salinger frequently visited the Mitchell household and read drafts of The Catcher in the Rye to Mitchell and his wife, Esther. Salinger selected Mitchell to design the red horse-and-carousel dust jacket for the book's initial 1951 publication. After Salinger relocated to New Hampshire, the two maintained a correspondence by letters, spanning from May 22, 1951, to December 22, 1990. Mitchell served as best man at Salinger's 1955 wedding to Claire Douglas.

Following a personal rift in the 1990s, Mitchell sold 14 letters written by Salinger to a manuscript dealer. The collection was acquired by the Morgan Library & Museum in New York City and placed on public display in 2010.

At some point in his career, Mitchell created concept art for Stanley Kubrick and Ray Bradbury.

=== Teaching and animation career ===
In the early 1970s, Mitchell's artwork appeared in Lithopinion, a journal published by the Amalgamated Lithographers of America. He taught illustration at the Parsons School of Design in 1973 before moving to Milan, Italy, in 1974 to serve as visual director for the live-action/animated film It's Our World, Too. His work in Europe influenced his later production design on the 1992 animated film FernGully: The Last Rainforest.

Mitchell moved to Southern California in the late 1970s, working as an animator and storyboard artist for Ruby-Spears Productions and Hanna-Barbera Productions. His animation credits across film and television include Flash Gordon, Fat Albert and the Cosby Kids, Thundarr the Barbarian, and Camp Candy. During his final decade, Mitchell taught figure drawing in the Character Animation program at the California Institute of the Arts (CalArts) in Valencia, California. He also briefly worked on the concept art of Mike Nguyen's film My Little World.

Mitchell died on September 6, 2009. CalArts president Steven Lavine issued a statement praising Mitchell's dedication to teaching and his contributions to the animation program.
