= Hapworth 16, 1924 =

Novella by Jerome David Salinger

- Short story by J. D. Salinger
- Country: United States
- Language: English

Publication
- Published in: The New Yorker
- Publication date: June 19, 1965

"Hapworth 16, 1924" is an uncollected work of short fiction by J. D. Salinger that appeared in the June 19, 1965, issue of The New Yorker.

The story is the last original work Salinger published during his lifetime, and filled almost the entire magazine. It is the "youngest" of his Glass family stories, in the sense that the narrated events happen chronologically before those in the rest of the series.

== Plot ==
46-year-old Buddy Glass reproduces the contents of a letter written by his older brother Seymour, who died by suicide 17 years earlier in 1948. Seymour wrote the letter to their parents while he and Buddy (two years his junior) were attending Camp Simon Hapworth, Maine, in 1924. The literary voice conveyed in the letter is that of a highly articulate and strikingly precocious boy of seven. The letter, written from his bunk in his cabin (Seymour has injured his leg) is a wide-ranging commentary on the camp personnel, the camp attendees, and his relationships with his family, humanity and God. Seymour and Buddy largely prefer to occupy themselves writing poems and short stories rather than participate in group activities. They therefore meet with some hostility.

Seymour devotes a large part of the letter to enumerating his reading list and requests for further reading material from his parents. He offers critical appraisals of a number of major literary figures. The letter closes with a lengthy discourse on the significance of God.

== Publishing history ==
The circumstances and considerations that led chief fiction editor William Shawn at The New Yorker to devote virtually the entire June 19, 1965, edition to "Hapworth 16, 1924" are obscure. Biographer Kenneth Slawenki writes, "the files of The New Yorker are unusually silent on the details of the novella's reception by the editorial staff and its eventual reception by William Shawn." The correspondence between Salinger and Shawn chronicling the decision may have been deliberately suppressed. Slawenski speculates that the appearance of Salinger's piece in the journal was "a fait accompli rather than a topic of debate".

After the story's appearance in The New Yorker, Salinger—who had already withdrawn to his New Hampshire home—stopped publishing altogether. Since the story never appeared in book form, readers had to seek out that issue or find it on microfilm. Finally, with the release of The Complete New Yorker on DVD in 2005, the story was once again widely available.

In 1996, Orchises Press, a small Virginia publishing house, started a process of publishing "Hapworth" in book form. Orchises Press owner Roger Lathbury has described the effort in The Washington Post and, three months after Salinger's death, in New York magazine. According to Lathbury, Salinger was deeply concerned with the proposed book's appearance, even visiting Washington to examine the cloth for the binding. Salinger also sent Lathbury numerous "infectious and delightful and loving" letters.

Following publishing norms, Lathbury applied for Library of Congress Cataloging in Publication data, unaware of how publicly available the information would be. A writer in Seattle, researching an article on Jeff Bezos, came across the "Hapworth" publication date, and told his sister, a journalist for the Washington Business Journal, who wrote an article about the upcoming book. This led to substantial coverage in the press. Shortly before the books were to be shipped, Salinger changed his mind, and Orchises withdrew the book. New publication dates were repeatedly announced, but it never appeared. Lathbury said, "I never reached back out. I thought about writing some letters, but it wouldn't have done any good."

== Reception and assessment ==
Crucial to any approach to the Glass family stories is a recognition of Salinger's refusal to recast standard literary forms, a tendency that becomes most manifest in the diffuse and digressive Seymour: An Introduction and the shapeless and interminable "Hapworth."—Literary critic John Wenke in J. D. Salinger: A Study of the Short Fiction (1991).

Both contemporary and later literary critics harshly panned "Hapworth 16, 1924"; writing in The New York Times, Michiko Kakutani called it "a sour, implausible and, sad to say, completely charmless story .... filled with digressions, narcissistic asides and ridiculous shaggy-dog circumlocutions."

Calling it "virtually unreadable" and "an enigma", critic John Wenke compares "Hapworth" to viewing a neighbor's unedited family home movies. He writes:

Possibly the least structured and most tedious piece of fiction ever produced by an important writer, "Hapworth" seems designed to bore, to tax patience, as if Salinger was trying to torment his readers.

Wenke adds that the story is a striking departure from the "urbane, pithy and wry" short fiction The New Yorker's editors and readership favored.

Biographer Kenneth Slawenski considers the piece "professionally, a disaster" and ponders what may have motivated Salinger to submit the work for publication:

Questions regarding "Hapworth" have plagued Salinger fans ever since. Did he intentionally write the story as his final publication? Why is "Hapworth" so unreadable? The story fostered a suspicion that...Salinger attempted to release himself from the affections of average readers by feeding them a work that was completely indigestible.

Biographer Ian Hamilton concurs that Salinger appears to abandon his loyal readership and retreat into the exclusive realm of his characters. He writes, "The Glass family has, in this last story, become Salinger's subject and his readership, his creatures and his companions. His life is finally made one with art."

Salinger is said to have considered the story a "high point of his writing" and made tentative steps to have it reprinted, though those came to nothing.

== Sources ==
- Hamiton, Ian. 1988. In Search of J. D. Salinger. Random House, 1988. ISBN 978-0571269273
- Slawenski, Kenneth. 2010. J. D. Salinger: A Life. Random House, New York. ISBN 978-1-4000-6951-4
- Wenke, John. 1991. J. D. Salinger: A Study of the Short Fiction. Twaynes Studies in Short Fiction, Gordon Weaver, General Editor. Twayne Publishers, New York. ISBN 0-8057-8334-2
- French, Warren (1988). J. D. Salinger, Revisited. Boston, Massachusetts: Twayne Publishers. ISBN 0-8057-7522-6.
- Lathbury, Roger "Betraying Salinger", New York, April 4, 2010. Retrieved on May 22, 2010.
- Lundegaard, Karen M. (2010) "J. D. Salinger resurfaces ... in Alexandria?", Washington Business Journal, November 15, 1996. Retrieved on August 13, 2008.
- Lundegaard, Erik (1996) Three Stories with J. D. Salinger
- Noah, Timothy. "Hapworth 16, 1924: A Chatterbox Investigation", Slate, September 11, 2000. Retrieved on August 10, 2008.
- Shapira, Ian (January 29, 2010). "Publisher Roger Lathbury recalls book deal with J. D. Salinger that went sour". Washington Post.
