= Franny and Zooey =

1961 novel by J. D. Salinger

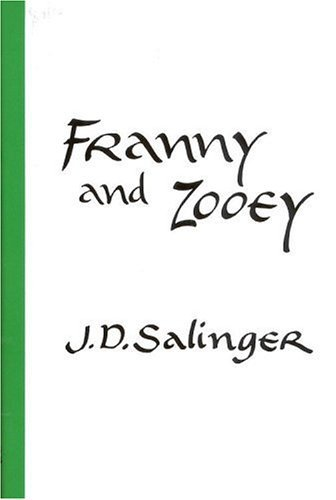
- 1961 hardcover
- Author: J. D. Salinger
- Language: English
- Published: 1961 Little, Brown
- Publication place: United States
- Media type: Print (hardback & paperback)
- Pages: 201
- ISBN: 0-316-76954-1 (hc)
- OCLC: 68569936
- Preceded by: Nine Stories
- Followed by: Raise High the Roof Beam, Carpenters and Seymour: An Introduction

Franny and Zooey is a book by American author J. D. Salinger which comprises his short story "Franny" and novella Zooey /ˈzuː.iː/. The two works were published together as a book in 1961, having originally appeared in The New Yorker in 1955 and 1957 respectively. The book focuses on siblings Franny and Zooey, the two youngest members of the Glass family, which was a frequent focus of Salinger's writings.

Franny tells the story of Franny Glass, Zooey's sister, a college student. The story takes place in an unnamed college town during Franny's weekend visit to her boyfriend Lane. Disenchanted with the selfishness and inauthenticity she perceives all around her, she aims to escape it through spiritual means.

Zooey is set shortly after the events of Franny in the Glass family apartment in New York City's Upper East Side. While actor Zooey's younger sister Franny suffers a spiritual and existential breakdown in their parents' Manhattan living room, leaving their mother Bessie deeply concerned, Zooey comes to Franny's aid, offering what he thinks is brotherly love, understanding, and words of sage advice.

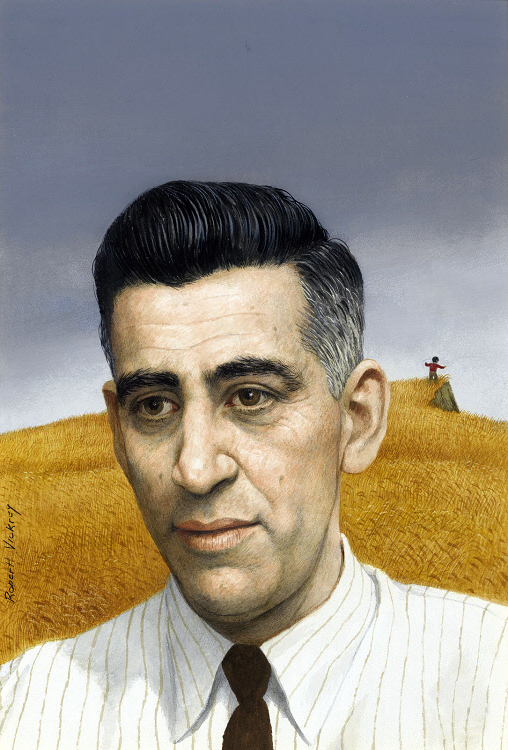
1961 illustration of J.D. Salinger from TIME magazine

== Plot summary ==
=== Franny ===
The short story concerns Franny's weekend date with her collegiate boyfriend, Lane Coutell. Lane takes her to a fashionable lunch room, where Franny quickly becomes exasperated when he appears interested only in conversing about the minutiae of his academic frustrations. Franny questions the importance of college education and the worth of Lane's friends. She eats nothing, feels faint, and becomes progressively more uncomfortable talking to Lane. Eventually, she excuses herself to visit the restroom, where, after a nervous breakdown, she regains her composure.

Franny returns to the table, where she expresses her feeling of being troubled with egotism and the need to be accomplished. Lane then spots the small book that Franny has been carrying and asks her about it. She explains that the book is titled The Way of a Pilgrim and tells the story of how a Russian wanderer learns the power of "praying without ceasing". The Jesus Prayer involves internalizing the prayer "Lord Jesus Christ, have mercy on me" to a point where, in a manner similar to a Zen koan, it becomes unconscious, almost like a heartbeat. Lane is less interested in the story than in keeping their timetable for the party and football game, though when Franny faints due to her mental state, he tends to her and postpones the weekend's activities. After she wakes, he goes to call a taxi to take her to her lodging and leaves Franny alone. The story concludes with Franny lying in the restaurant, her lips moving soundlessly, suggesting that she is practising the act of praying without ceasing.

=== Zooey ===
Zooey reads a four-year-old letter from his brother Buddy in the bath in his family's home. In the letter, Buddy discusses their eldest brother Seymour's suicide several years previously and encourages Zooey to pursue an acting career if he is drawn to it. Zooey's mother, Bessie, enters the bathroom, and the two have a long discussion, centering upon Bessie's worries about his sister, Franny, who is in a state of emotional collapse and is refusing food. During the conversation, Zooey verbally spars and banters with his mother and repeatedly requests that she leave. Bessie tolerates Zooey's behavior, and simply states that he's becoming more and more like his brother Buddy and wonders what has happened to her children who were once so "sweet and loving".

After Bessie leaves, Zooey gets dressed and goes to the living room, where he finds Franny on the sofa with their cat Bloomberg. He begins speaking with her and ends up upsetting Franny by claiming that her motives for reciting the "Jesus Prayer" are rooted in ego reinforcement. Zooey feels guilty and retreats into the former bedroom of Seymour and Buddy, and reads the back of their door, covered in philosophical and religious quotations. After contemplation, Zooey telephones Franny, pretending to be Buddy. Franny eventually discovers the ruse, but she and Zooey continue to talk. Zooey shares with her some words of wisdom that Seymour once gave him, suggesting that one should live with optimism and love because, even if nobody else does, Jesus notices. After Zooey hangs up, Franny lies in their parents' bed and smiles at the ceiling before eventually falling asleep.

== Major themes ==
The story reflects Salinger's known interest in Eastern religious philosophies such as Zen Buddhism and Hindu Advaita Vedanta, as well as Eastern Orthodox Christian spirituality. There is also a discussion of whether the book is a "mystical story" or a "love story" in the introduction to the second section, as speculated by the book's narrator, Buddy Glass (who decides it's the latter). Gerald Rosen, in his 1977 book Zen in the Art of J. D. Salinger, observes that Franny and Zooey could be interpreted as a modern Zen tale, with the main character Franny progressing throughout the short story and novella from a state of ignorance to the deep wisdom of enlightenment. Jennifer Dunn, in an essay, mentioned that the “disparity between bright busy surfaces and inner emptiness” found in Franny and Zooey can be read as a metaphor for modern society. Carl Bode, in a University of Wisconsin journal, suggested that Salinger, while writing in Franny and Zooey that “the phoney and the genuine equally deserve our love,” found this as an answer to some of his own emotional problems.

== Original publication ==
The book is a reworking from "Ivanoff, the Terrible" (1956).

"Franny" and Zooey were originally published separately in The New Yorker magazine. "Franny" appeared in the magazine in the January 29, 1955 issue, and Zooey in the May 4, 1957 issue. Salinger published "Franny" and “Zooey” together as a book in July 1961, through Little, Brown and Company, and dedicated the book to New Yorker editor William Shawn.

Since the misconception that Franny was pregnant was nearly universal at the time of original publication (the New Yorker's editors themselves believed Franny was pregnant), Salinger first edited the text before reconsidering, torn between his annoyance at the notion readers might interpret the story through the lens of a pregnant Franny on one hand, and his reluctance of delivering clear-cut messages on the other. In the end, he made only a single change; having Lane Coutell say "Too goddam long between drinks. To put it crassly," in the hope this was seen as a reference to sex rather than menstruation. According to the Salinger scholar Warren French, the change was insufficient.

== Reception ==
The book was very popular with the reading public, spending 26 weeks at the top of The New York Times Fiction Best Sellers list in 1961 and 1962, but critics gave it mixed reviews. John Updike felt that Salinger's work was more than adequate. He praised Salinger's characterizations, writing that they "melt indistinguishably together in an impossible radiance of personal beauty and intelligence". He also pointed out that Salinger has a "correctly unctuous and apprehensive tone". However, a few critics thought that Salinger had shamed himself with this particular piece of work. Janet Malcolm quotes Maxwell Geismar who called it an "appallingly bad story", and George Steiner called it "a piece of shapeless self indulgence". In 2011, Jay McInerney criticized the creation of the "self satisfied Glass family", but also stated that the story showed Salinger's "evolving beliefs".

== Adaptations and legacy ==
The 1995 Iranian film Pari is a loose adaptation of the book.

The book's characters inspired much of the child prodigy material present in Wes Anderson's 2001 movie The Royal Tenenbaums.

The book plays a central role in the 2016 film Carrie Pilby, as well as in the romance of the protagonists in the 2020 Netflix series Dash & Lily.

== Release details ==
- 1961, United States, Little, Brown and Company. ISBN 0-316-76954-1, Hardback
- 1991, United States & Canada, Little, Brown and Company. ISBN 0-316-76949-5, Soft cover, Reprint

== Bibliography ==
- Salinger, J.D. (1961). Franny and Zooey. Little, Brown. p. 201. ISBN 0-316-76954-1.
