= The Catcher in the Rye =

1951 American novel by J. D. Salinger

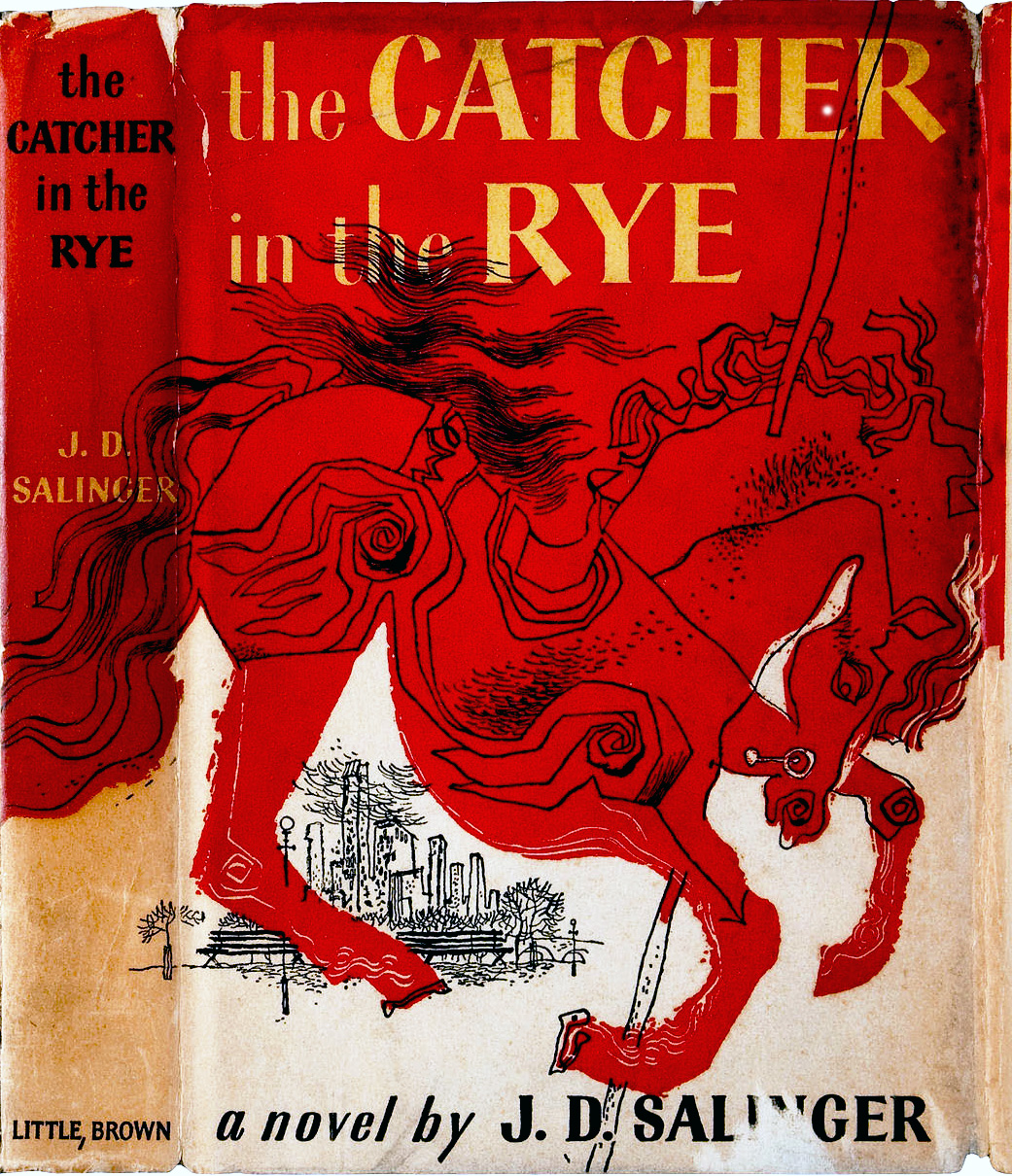
- First edition cover
- Author: J. D. Salinger
- Cover artist: E. Michael Mitchell
- Language: English
- Genre: Realistic fiction, Coming-of-age fiction
- Published: July 16, 1951
- Publisher: Little, Brown and Company
- Publication place: United States
- Media type: Print
- Pages: 234 (may vary)
- OCLC: 287628
- Dewey Decimal: 813.54

The Catcher in the Rye is a 1951 American coming-of-age novel by American author J. D. Salinger. It was partially published in serial form in 1945–1946 before being novelized in 1951.

Originally intended for adults, it is often read by adolescents for its themes of angst and alienation, and as a critique of superficiality in society. The novel also deals with themes of innocence, identity, belonging, loss, connection, sex, and depression. The main character, Holden Caulfield, has become an icon for teenage rebellion. Caulfield, nearly of age, gives his opinion on a wide variety of topics as he narrates his recent life events.

The Catcher in the Rye has been translated widely. About one million copies are sold each year, with total sales of more than 65 million books. The novel was included on Time's 2005 list of the 100 best English-language novels written since 1923, and it was named by Modern Library and its readers as one of the 100 best English-language novels of the 20th century. In 2003, it was listed at number 15 on the BBC's survey "The Big Read".

== Plot ==
Holden Caulfield recalls the events of a long weekend, shortly before the previous year's Christmas. Holden has been expelled from the elite boarding school Pencey Preparatory Academy after failing all his classes except English. On the night of his departure, he meets with a teacher and agrees to write an essay for his roommate Ward Stradlater. Stradlater is heading out on a date with Jane Gallagher, Holden's childhood friend and crush. Holden recounts Jane’s habits to Stradlater, and is upset when Stradlater is only amused at the mention of Jane’s stepfather being sexually inappropriate with her. Holden writes an essay about his late brother Allie, who died of leukemia at thirteen. Stradlater is angry at the essay, and refuses to say whether he had sex with Jane and they fight. After losing, Holden decides to catch a train to New York City and stay away from his home until Wednesday.

Holden stays at a hotel, where he drinks and dances with adults at a club. He hires an underage prostitute named Sunny, then refuses to have sex with her. Her pimp, Maurice, arrives to beat and rob him. The next day, Holden donates his money to two nuns, goes on a date with a girl he used to see and meets with an older ex-classmate at a club to pester him with questions about sex.

After running out of money, Holden sneaks into his family’s apartment while his parents are out, to see his younger sister, Phoebe. She chastises him for getting expelled and asks if he cares about anything. Holden is distracted by thinking of a former classmate who was assaulted by bullies and threw himself out of the window to escape, committing suicide. He then shares a fantasy (based on a mishearing of Robert Burns' "Comin' Thro' the Rye"), in which he imagines himself saving children running through a field of rye by catching them before they fall off a nearby cliff. Phoebe points out that the actual poem says, "when a body meet a body, comin' through the rye." Holden breaks down in tears, and Phoebe tries to console him.

Holden leaves to visit his former English teacher, Mr. Antolini, whom he admires for having been the first one to retrieve his dead ex-classmate's body. Mr. Antolini gives him advice and a place to sleep. Holden goes to bed in his underwear, and is awoken by Mr. Antolini stroking his head. Fearing sexual intent, alluding to prior abuse, Holden gets dressed and flees. Disillusioned, he spends the night at Grand Central Terminal and decides he wants to run away.

Holden leaves a note at Phoebe's school explaining his plan. They meet at the Metropolitan Museum of Art to say goodbye, but she instead asks to join him. Holden refuses, which upsets Phoebe. He tries to cheer her up by taking her to the Central Park Zoo and buying her a ticket to the carousel. It starts to rain, but the sight of her riding the carousel makes him happy. The novel ends with Holden alluding to meeting his parents, getting sick, being sent to a sanatorium in California near his older brother, D. B, and saying he hopes to go back to school next September.

== History ==
Various older stories by Salinger contain characters similar to those in The Catcher in the Rye. While at Columbia University, Salinger wrote a short story called "The Young Folks" in Whit Burnett's class; one character from this story has been described as a "thinly penciled prototype of Sally Hayes". In November 1941 he sold the story "Slight Rebellion off Madison", which featured Holden Caulfield, to The New Yorker, but it was not published until December 21, 1946, due to World War II.

The story "I'm Crazy", which was published in the December 22, 1945 issue of Collier's, contained material that was later used in The Catcher in the Rye. In 1946, The New Yorker accepted a 90-page manuscript about Holden Caulfield for publication, but Salinger later withdrew it. The school Holden attends is Pencey Preparatory Academy, a boarding school in Pennsylvania that Salinger may have based on the Valley Forge Military Academy and College.

The novel was scheduled for publication in the Spring of 1951 but the date was then set at July 16 after the Book-of-the-Month Club made its midsummer selection.

Peter Beidler in his A Reader's Companion to J. D. Salinger's "The Catcher in the Rye" identified the movie that the prostitute "Sunny" refers to. In chapter 13 she says that in the movie a boy who looked like Holden fell off a boat, and from this detail, Beidler deduced that the movie was Captains Courageous (1937), with the boy played by child-actor Freddie Bartholomew.

== Writing style ==
The Catcher in the Rye is narrated in a subjective style from the point of view of Holden Caulfield, following his exact thought processes. There is flow in the seemingly disjointed ideas and episodes; for example, as Holden sits in a chair in his dorm, minor events, such as picking up a book or looking at a table, unfold into discussions about experiences.

Critical reviews affirm that the novel accurately reflected the teenage colloquial speech of the time. Words and phrases that appear frequently include:

- "Flitty" – homosexual
- "Give her the time" – sexual intercourse
- "Killed" – gave a humorous impression
- "Necking" – kissing, hugging, and caressing passionately
- "Phony" – people who are dishonest or fake about who they really are
- "Prince" – a fine, generous, helpful fellow (often used in sarcastic fashion)
- "Rubbernecks" – people who turn their heads to gaze in curiosity
- "To shoot the bull" – To make small talk to pass the time
- "Snowing" – deceiving, misleading, or winning over by glib talk, flattery, etc.

== Interpretations ==
=== As a coming-of-age story ===
Bruce Brooks held that Holden's attitude remains unchanged at story's end, implying no maturation, thus differentiating the novel from young adult fiction. In contrast, Louis Menand thought that teachers assign the novel because of the optimistic ending, to teach adolescent readers that "alienation is just a phase." While Brooks maintained that Holden acts his age, Menand claimed that Holden thinks as an adult, given his ability to accurately perceive people and their motives. Others highlight the dilemma of Holden's state, in between adolescence and adulthood. Holden is quick to become emotional. "I felt sorry as hell for..." is a phrase he often uses. It is often said that Holden changes at the end, when he watches Phoebe on the carousel, and he talks about the golden ring and how it's good for kids to try to grab it.

Each Caulfield child has literary talent. D. B. writes screenplays in Hollywood; Holden also reveres D. B. for his writing skill (Holden's own best subject), but he also despises Hollywood industry-based movies, considering them the ultimate in "phony" as the writer has no space for his own imagination and describes D. B.'s move to Hollywood to write for films as "prostituting himself"; Allie wrote poetry on his baseball glove; and Phoebe is a diarist. This "catcher in the rye" is an analogy for Holden, who admires in children attributes that he often struggles to find in adults, like innocence, kindness, spontaneity, and generosity. Falling off the cliff could be a progression into the adult world that surrounds him and that he strongly criticizes. Later, Phoebe and Holden exchange roles as the "catcher" and the "fallen"; he gives her his hunting hat, the catcher's symbol, and becomes the fallen as Phoebe becomes the catcher.

=== Sexuality, rape and innocence ===
Critics like Grossman have argued that Holden's own difficulties with sex stem from the sexually violent upper-class culture he grew up in. At one point, Holden confesses he's a virgin because he stops when a girl says "no," unlike Stradlater, and wonders whether or not he's supposed to. Similarly throughout the novel, Holden is preoccupied by his failure to have and discomfort with sex, mirroring his overall discomfort with growing up and fixation on innocence.

During the first part of the book at Pencey, Holden shares how Stradlater often had sex with girls who actively refused on double dates, an act that would fall under the modern definition of rape, while Holden was in the same car. Afraid Stradlater would do the same to Jane, he attempts to humanize her by sharing her quirks, like lining up her kings in the backrow during checkers, and then more desperately, her "lousy childhood," where her alcoholic stepfather would expose himself to her. When Stradlater refuses to answer whether or not he had sex with her, an act that is equivalent to assault for Holden, they get into a fight.

Strauch writes that Jane's kings in the back row symbolically represent defense against a sexual attack, and that Holden's moral rejection of the sexually violent culture of his peers is one reason for his dislike of and alienation from them. Further, he writes that Jane is part of Holden's "private world of innocence... which embraces a secret goldfish, Holden’s dead brother Allie, his sister Phoebe (all children, in fact), Jane Gallegher, nuns, and animals…" Stradlater's possible assault becomes a symbol for his fear of society's corruption of what he holds to be dear and innocent, a fear that runs throughout the novel.

There is disagreement among critics whether Mr. Antolini carressing Holden's head while Holden was asleep and undressed constitutes a sexual advance. Nevertheless, several interpretations characterize Holden's strong reaction to Mr. Antolini's actions and Holden's own confession that similarly "perverty" things had happened several times to him, as evidence Holden was molested as a child, and a possible source for his trouble with sexuality.

=== As a reflection of war and national identity ===
In their biography of Salinger, David Shields and Shane Salerno argue that: "The Catcher in the Rye can best be understood as a disguised war novel." Salinger witnessed the horrors of World War II, but rather than writing a combat novel, Salinger, according to Shields and Salerno, "took the trauma of war and embedded it within what looked to the naked eye like a coming-of-age novel."

In his book Rebels: Youth and the Cold War Origins of Identity, Professor Leerom Medovoi posits that The Catcher in the Rye is "centered on identity", and that Holden Caulfield "epitomizes the triumph of the young rebel as a requisite figure for representing the national identity of America". Medovoi says that in contrast to the oppressive governance of the 1950s Soviet Union, America thought itself a plucky and rebellious player on the world stage, similar to how Holden felt in contrast with the phony adult world.

== Reception ==
The Catcher in the Rye has been consistently listed as one of the best novels of the twentieth century. Shortly after its publication, in an article for The New York Times, Nash K. Burger called it "an unusually brilliant novel", while James Stern wrote an admiring review of the book in a voice imitating Holden's. George H. W. Bush called it a "marvelous book", listing it among the books that inspired him. In June 2009, the BBC's Finlo Rohrer wrote that, 58 years since publication, the book is still regarded "as the defining work on what it is like to be a teenager." Out of all teen demographics over the years, troubled and depressed teens seem to have a greater tendency to relate with Holden.

In a 1975 interview with Robert Coles, renowned child psychoanalyst Anne Freud shares her experience treating teens who read The Catcher in the Rye for school. "I got to know this Holden Caulfield by hearsay before I met him as a reader. My analytic patients spoke of him sometimes as if they'd actually met him; they used his words, his way of speaking. ... I began to realize that they had taken him into their minds, and hugged him – they spoke, now, not only his words in the book (quotations from it) but his words become their own words." Adam Gopnik considers it one of the "three perfect books" in American literature, along with Adventures of Huckleberry Finn and The Great Gatsby, and believes that "no book has ever captured a city better than Catcher in the Rye captured New York in the fifties."

In an appraisal of The Catcher in the Rye written after the death of J. D. Salinger, Jeff Pruchnic says the novel has retained its appeal for many generations. Pruchnic describes Holden as a "teenage protagonist frozen midcentury but destined to be discovered by those of a similar age in every generation to come."

Not all reception has been positive. Book critic Jonathan Yardley, in 2004, wrote that the experience of rereading the novel after several decades proved to be "a painful experience: The combination of Salinger's execrable prose and Caulfield's jejune narcissism produced effects comparable to mainlining castor oil." Yardley described the novel as among the worst popular books in the annals of American literature. "Why", Yardley asked, "do English teachers, whose responsibility is to teach good writing, repeatedly and reflexively require students to read a book as badly written as this one?" In 2009, Rohrer, wrote that many contemporary readers "just cannot understand what the fuss is about.... many of these readers are disappointed that the novel fails to meet the expectations generated by the mystique it is shrouded in. J. D. Salinger has done his part to enhance this mystique. That is to say, he has done nothing." Rohrer assessed the reasons behind both the popularity and criticism of the book, saying that it "captures existential teenage angst" and has a "complex central character" and "accessible conversational style"; while at the same time some readers may dislike the "use of 1940s New York vernacular" and the excessive "whining" of the "self-obsessed character".

== Censorship in the United States ==
In 1960, a teacher in Tulsa, Oklahoma, was fired for assigning the novel in class. She was later reinstated. Between 1961 and 1982, The Catcher in the Rye was the most censored book in high schools and libraries in the United States. The book was briefly banned in Issaquah, Washington high schools in 1978 when three members of the School Board alleged the book was part of an "overall communist plot". This ban did not last long, and the offending board members were immediately recalled and removed in a special election. In 1981, it was both the most censored book and the second most taught book in public schools in the United States. According to the American Library Association, The Catcher in the Rye was the 10th most frequently challenged book from 1990 to 1999. It was one of the ten most challenged books of 2005, and although it had been off the list for three years, it reappeared in the list of most challenged books of 2009.

The challenges generally begin with Holden's frequent use of vulgar language; other reasons include sexual references, blasphemy, undermining of family values and moral codes, encouragement of rebellion, and promotion of drinking, smoking, lying, promiscuity, and sexual abuse. The book was written for an adult audience, which often forms the foundation of many challengers' arguments against it. Often the challengers have been unfamiliar with the plot itself. Shelley Keller-Gage, a high school teacher who faced objections after assigning the novel in her class, noted that "the challengers are being just like Holden. ... They are trying to be catchers in the rye." Censorship of the book often causes a Streisand effect, as such incidents cause many to put themselves on the waiting list to borrow the novel, where there was no waiting list before.

== Violent reactions ==
Several shootings have been associated with Salinger's novel, including Robert John Bardo's murder of Rebecca Schaeffer and John Hinckley Jr.'s assassination attempt on Ronald Reagan. Additionally, after fatally shooting John Lennon, Mark David Chapman was arrested with a copy of the book that he had purchased that same day, inside of which he had written: "To Holden Caulfield, From Holden Caulfield, This is my statement."

Commenting on the fascination of Hinckley and Chapman, Harvey Solomon-Brady wrote:

Compared to books lauded by other killers – George Orwell's 1984 by John F. Kennedy's assassin Lee Harvey Oswald, C.S. Lewis's meditations on Christianity by Gianni Versace's murderer Andrew Cunanan and Joseph Conrad's The Secret Agent by Unabomber Ted Kaczynski – The Catcher in the Rye stands out in its devastating ability to influence without explicit instruction.

== Attempted adaptations ==
=== In film ===
Early in his career, Salinger expressed a willingness to have his work adapted for the screen. In 1949, a critically panned film version of his short story "Uncle Wiggily in Connecticut" was released; renamed My Foolish Heart, the film took great liberties with Salinger's plot and is widely considered to be among the reasons that Salinger refused to allow any subsequent film adaptations of his work. The enduring success of The Catcher in the Rye, however, has resulted in repeated attempts to secure the novel's screen rights.

When The Catcher in the Rye was first released, many offers were made to adapt it for the screen, including one from Samuel Goldwyn, producer of My Foolish Heart. In a letter written in the early 1950s, Salinger spoke of mounting a play in which he would play the role of Holden Caulfield opposite Margaret O'Brien, and, if he couldn't play the part himself, to "forget about it." Almost 50 years later, the writer Joyce Maynard definitively concluded, "The only person who might ever have played Holden Caulfield would have been J. D. Salinger."

Salinger told Maynard in the 1970s that Jerry Lewis "tried for years to get his hands on the part of Holden," the protagonist in the novel which Lewis had not read until he was in his thirties. Film industry figures including Marlon Brando, Jack Nicholson, Ralph Bakshi, Tobey Maguire and Leonardo DiCaprio have tried to make a film adaptation. In an interview with Premiere, John Cusack commented that his one regret about turning 21 was that he had become too old to play Holden Caulfield. Writer-director Billy Wilder recounted his abortive attempts to snare the novel's rights:

Of course I read The Catcher in the Rye... Wonderful book. I loved it. I pursued it. I wanted to make a picture out of it. And then one day a young man came to the office of Leland Hayward, my agent, in New York, and said, "Please tell Mr. Leland Hayward to lay off. He's very, very insensitive." And he walked out. That was the entire speech. I never saw him. That was J. D. Salinger and that was Catcher in the Rye.

In 1961, Salinger denied Elia Kazan permission to direct a stage adaptation of Catcher for Broadway. Later, Salinger's agents received bids for the Catcher film rights from Harvey Weinstein and Steven Spielberg, neither of which was even passed on to Salinger for consideration.

In 2003, the BBC television program The Big Read featured The Catcher in the Rye, interspersing discussions of the novel with "a series of short films that featured an actor playing J. D. Salinger's adolescent antihero, Holden Caulfield." The show defended its unlicensed adaptation of the novel by claiming to be a "literary review", and no major charges were filed.

In 2008, the rights of Salinger's works were placed in the JD Salinger Literary Trust where Salinger was the sole trustee. Phyllis Westberg, who was Salinger's agent at Harold Ober Associates in New York, declined to say who the trustees are now that the author is dead. After Salinger died in 2010, Westberg stated that nothing had changed in terms of licensing film, television, or stage rights of his works. A letter written by Salinger in 1957 revealed that he was open to an adaptation of The Catcher in the Rye released after his death. He wrote: "Firstly, it is possible that one day the rights will be sold. Since there's an ever-looming possibility that I won't die rich, I toy very seriously with the idea of leaving the unsold rights to my wife and daughter as a kind of insurance policy. It pleasures me no end, though, I might quickly add, to know that I won't have to see the results of the transaction." Salinger also wrote that he believed his novel was not suitable for film treatment, and that translating Holden Caulfield's first-person narrative into voice-over and dialogue would be contrived.

In 2020, Don Hahn revealed that The Walt Disney Company had almost made an animated film titled Dufus which would have been an adaptation of The Catcher in the Rye "with German shepherds", most likely akin to Oliver & Company. The idea came from then CEO Michael Eisner who loved the book and wanted to do an adaptation. After being told that J. D. Salinger would not agree to sell the film rights, Eisner stated, "Well, let's just do that kind of story, that kind of growing up, coming of age story."

=== Banned fan sequel ===
In 2009, the year before he died, Salinger successfully sued to stop the U.S. publication of a novel that presents Holden Caulfield as an old man. The novel's author, Fredrik Colting, commented: "Call me an ignorant Swede, but the last thing I thought possible in the U.S. was that you banned books". The issue is complicated by the nature of Colting's book, 60 Years Later: Coming Through the Rye, which has been compared to fan fiction.

== See also ==
- Book censorship in the United States
- Le Monde's 100 Books of the Century
