= I'm Crazy =

1945 short story by J. D. Salinger

"I'm Crazy" is a short story written by J. D. Salinger for the December 22, 1945 issue of Collier's magazine. Despite the story's underlying melancholy, the magazine described it as "the heart-warming story of a kid whose only fault lay in understanding people so well that most of them were baffled by him and only a very few would believe in him".

The story is told in first-person narrative mode by Holden Caulfield. Salinger later reworked the story to incorporate it into his novel The Catcher in the Rye.

== Synopsis ==
Boarding school dropout Holden Caulfield watches a basketball game from a nearby hill. He then visits his elderly history teacher Mr. Spencer, who lectures him about his academic failure. Holden tells Mr. Spencer about meeting the mother of a "lousy" fellow student on the train and lying to her about how wonderful her son was, which Holden thought would make her feel better. He regrets withdrawing from school mainly because his mother had just sent him ski boots, albeit the wrong kind.

Holden likes Mr. Spencer but realizes that he will receive no sympathy or understanding from him, so he leaves abruptly. He boards a train to New York City and sneaks into his family's apartment, where he talks to his younger sisters Phoebe and Viola. Even Phoebe admonishes him for his academic failure. Holden finally owns up to his parents in a scene that is only described very briefly and indirectly ("When they were all done with me ..."). He concludes that he will not be returned to school but forced into an unpleasant office job.
