= Pretty Mouth and Green My Eyes =

Short story by J. D. Salinger

- Short story by J. D. Salinger
- Country: United States
- Language: English
- Genre: Short story

Publication
- Published in: The New Yorker
- Publisher: Little, Brown and Company

"Pretty Mouth and Green My Eyes" is a short story by J.D. Salinger, initially published in the July 14, 1951 issue of The New Yorker, and later within the larger collection of Salinger's short works, Nine Stories (April, 1953). Over the span of a few telephone conversations, the story surrounds three adult characters and the remainder of their evening after leaving a party.

== Plot summary ==
The story opens with a phone ringing in Lee's apartment somewhere in New York. Sitting beside Lee is a young, blue-eyed woman. The two of them had been sitting and smoking together when Arthur calls, a colleague of Lee's, drunkenly concerned with the location of his wife. (Arthur later refers to his wife by her name, Joanie.) All of them had attended a party just hours before the phone call occurs.

Arthur goes through a scatter of out-loud thoughts and questions addressed to Lee, accompanied by a roller-coaster of emotions. Arthur's main concern is the whereabouts of his wife, even though he appears to regret his marriage to her. He later expresses concern about his job at the law firm.

Lee attempts to talk some sense into Arthur throughout the conversation, while Arthur continuously interrupts him. All the while Lee is on the phone, the girl with him is smoking and exchanging looks with him. Lee tries to reassure Arthur that his wife will probably arrive at any minute and that he should try to pull himself together before she walks in. Although neither the narrator nor the three characters explicitly confirm this, the girl Lee is with is implied to be Arthur's wife, Joanie. This connection isn't drawn until Arthur refers to Joanie's eyes as seashells. The phone call eventually tails off, with Lee convincing Arthur to get some rest.

The young woman and Lee exchange a few words and continue to smoke when they're interrupted by another phone call. It's Arthur again, letting Lee know that Joanie just walked in and that everything's all right, though both the reader and Lee know this not to be the case. Arthur talks a little while longer, explaining how he'd like to move to Connecticut with Joanie, contradicting everything he had said in the previous phone call.

Lee interrupts Arthur and explains that he has to go due to a headache with unexplained origins. Lee hangs up and the conversation ends abruptly, and in this way so does the story.

== Themes ==
An overarching theme that is frequently discussed is infidelity. Although not completely explicit, the reader is left to infer that Joanie is the young girl with Lee as well as Arthur's spouse who is being searched for. This theme is even stretched to Salinger's own personal life, English Professor Dr. Brett Weaver argues, "Joanie is based on Salinger's one-time girlfriend Oona O'Neill who threw him over for Charlie Chaplin, and that 'Pretty' is Salinger's revenge for his broken heart."

== Reception and interpretation ==
At its time of publication, "Pretty Mouth and Green My Eyes" received less critical reception than many of Salinger’s other stories. In 1966, author John V. Hagopian acknowledged that the most commentary made on the story was "three paragraphs by David L. Stevenson, [comparing] the story...with Hemingway's 'The Short, Happy Life of Francis Macomber.'" Hagopian professes "Pretty Mouth" as "lucid, controlled, and beautifully-formed." The story received more mention through inclusions in anthologies of Salinger's work, or other similar anthologies like Famous American Stories by Angus Burrell, which includes a short synopsis. Other acknowledgements of the story were interpretive. Author James Lundquist states "Pretty Mouth" is, "a story that disintegrates into pathos and, uncharacteristically, is without any healing sympathy." French author and artist Camille Bourniquel explains the story to be "an urbanized tale of the managerial set [consisting] of two telephone conversations."

== In popular culture ==
- In 1967, while a student of VGIK, Nikita Mikhalkov directed a short film And these lips, and eyes green… («И эти губы, и глаза зелёные…») based on the story, with Lev Durov in the lead role.
- In PJ Harvey's song "Angelene", the eponymous protagonist is a prostitute who longs for romance and alludes to Salinger's story, including by directly quoting Arthur's poem dedicated to his wife: "Rose is my color, and white / Pretty mouth and green my eyes."
