= Nine Stories (Salinger) =

Short story collection by J. D. Salinger

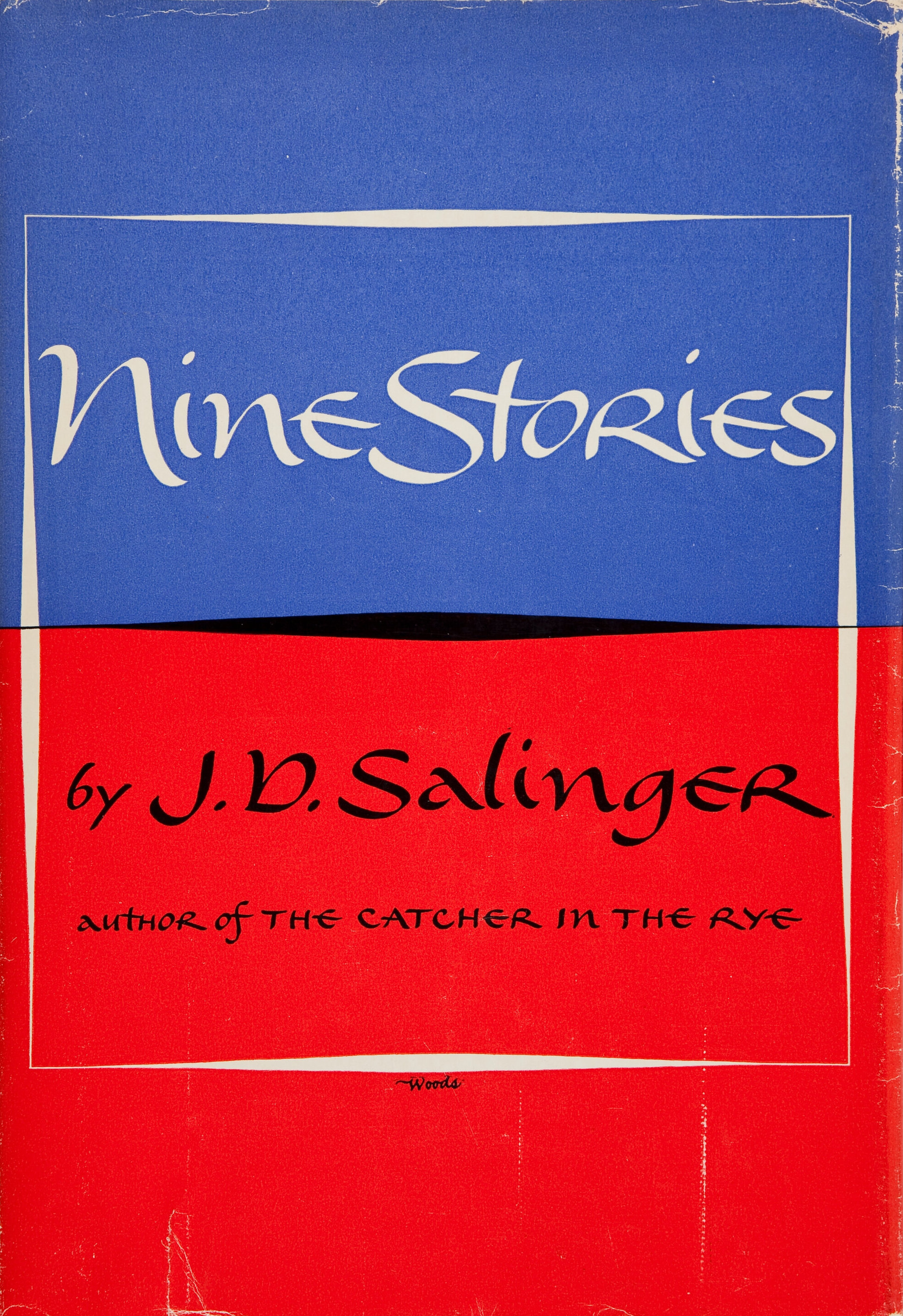
- First edition cover
- Author: J. D. Salinger
- Language: English
- Genre: Short stories
- Publisher: Little, Brown and Company
- Publication date: April 6, 1953
- Publication place: United States
- Media type: Print (hardback & paperback)
- OCLC: 45800520

Nine Stories is a collection of short stories by American fiction writer J. D. Salinger published in April 1953. It includes two of his most notable short stories, "A Perfect Day for Bananafish" and "For Esmé – with Love and Squalor". (Nine Stories is the U.S. title; the book is published in many other countries as For Esmé - with Love and Squalor, and Other Stories).

The stories are:

- "A Perfect Day for Bananafish"
- "Uncle Wiggily in Connecticut"
- "Just Before the War with the Eskimos"
- "The Laughing Man"
- "Down at the Dinghy"
- "For Esmé—with Love and Squalor"
- "Pretty Mouth and Green My Eyes"
- "De Daumier-Smith's Blue Period"
- "Teddy"
