= Raise High the Roof Beam, Carpenters and Seymour: An Introduction =

Book by J.D. Salinger

- First edition
- Author: J. D. Salinger
- Language: English
- Publisher: Little, Brown
- Publication date: 1963
- Publication place: United States
- Media type: Print (hardback & paperback)
- Pages: 248 pp
- Preceded by: Franny and Zooey
- Followed by: "Hapworth 16, 1924"

Raise High the Roof Beam, Carpenters and Seymour: An Introduction is a single volume featuring two novellas by J. D. Salinger, which were previously published in The New Yorker: Raise High the Roof Beam, Carpenters (1955) and Seymour: An Introduction (1959). Little, Brown republished them in this anthology in 1963. It was the first time the novellas had appeared in book form. The book was the third best-selling novel in the United States in 1963, according to Publishers Weekly.

== Raise High the Roof Beam, Carpenters ==
The story was originally published in the November 19, 1955, issue of The New Yorker.

Like many of the other Glass family stories, Raise High is narrated by Buddy Glass, the second of the Glass brothers. It describes Buddy's visit on Army leave (during World War II, in 1942) to attend the wedding of his brother Seymour to Muriel and tells of the aftermath when Seymour fails to show. The events set the stage for Seymour's suicide in 1948. Seymour is described through the eyes of Buddy and through those of the would-be wedding's attendants. Included is the Matron of Honor, a loud and burly woman whom Buddy meets in a car leaving the site of the wedding. The other passengers (who include the Matron of Honor's husband Robert; Muriel's father's deaf-mute uncle; and a middle-aged woman named Helen Silsburn) spend most of the car ride unaware of Buddy's family relation to the missing groom.

Throughout the story, the Matron of Honor criticizes Seymour, and describes how smart Muriel's mother Rhea is and her theories on Seymour's behavior. The conversations and Buddy's subsequent retort illustrates Buddy's annoyance with judgmental and insensitive people, and also reveals his closeness to Seymour. At one point in the story, Buddy finds Seymour's diary and rescues it before anyone can see it. He brings it in the bathroom and reads the only direct, unfiltered dialogue from Seymour. In the later story "Hapworth 16, 1924", Buddy asserts the letter is reproduced "word for word", as if to assure the reader these are Seymour's thoughts and not his.

The title is the first line of a message left for Seymour by his sister Boo Boo on the bathroom mirror of the family's apartment, which Buddy discovers towards the end of the story. The message itself begins with a line taken from Sappho's fragment LP 111:

Raise high the roof beam, carpenters. Like Ares comes the bridegroom, taller far than a tall man.

== Seymour: An Introduction ==
Seymour: An Introduction was also originally published in The New Yorker in 1959, four years after Raise High the Roof Beam, Carpenters.

As the title suggests, the story represents an attempt by Buddy Glass to introduce the reader to his brother Seymour, who had committed suicide in 1948. The story is told in a stream of consciousness narrative as Buddy reminisces in his secluded home.

This story, like others concerning the Glass family, touches upon Zen Buddhism, haiku, and the Hindu philosophy of Vedanta.
