= List of child prodigies =

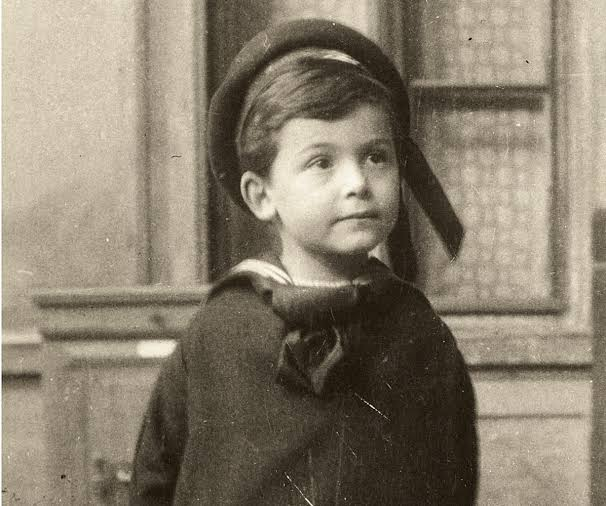
John von Neumann as a child

In psychology research literature, the term child prodigy is defined as a person under the age of ten who produces meaningful output in some domain to the level of an adult expert professional.

== Mathematics and science ==
- Blaise Pascal (1623–1662) was a French mathematician, physicist, and religious philosopher who wrote a treatise on vibrating bodies at the age of nine; he wrote his first proof, on a wall with a piece of coal, at the age of 11 years, and a theorem by the age of 16 years. He is famous for Pascal's theorem in geometry, Pascal's law in fluid mechanics, among other contributions.
- Alexis Clairaut (1713–1765) was a French mathematician, physicist and astronomer. He mastered Euclidean geometry and algebra at nine, and conics sections and calculus at ten. At twelve, he published a paper on the three-dimensional analytic geometry of space curves and was appointed to the French Academy of Sciences at eighteen. He is now best remembered for Clairaut's theorem, his research on the figure of the Earth, and his contributions to celestial mechanics.
- John Stuart Mill (1806–1873) was a British philosopher and economist. At the age of eight, Mill began studying Latin, the works of Euclid, and algebra. At about the age of twelve, Mill began a thorough study of the scholastic logic. In the following year he was introduced to Adam Smith and David Ricardo and studied political economy.
- Norbert Wiener (1894–1964) was an American philosopher and mathematician. He graduated from Ayer High School in Massachusetts at 11 years of age. He was awarded a BA in mathematics in 1909 from Tufts University at the age of 14. He earned his PhD in mathematics at Harvard University four years later. He subsequently joined the department of mathematics at the Massachusetts Institute of Technology (MIT), where he made valuable contributions to the studies of stochastic processes, statistics, cybernetics, and signal processing.
- William James Sidis (1898–1944) was a mathematics and language prodigy. Sidis was able to read The New York Times as an 18-month-old. He taught himself eight languages by age eight and invented his own. He was admitted into Harvard University at age 11, and in the same year attracted national attention for lecturing on 4-dimensional bodies to the Harvard Mathematical Club.
- John von Neumann (1903–1957) was a "mental calculator" by the age of six years, and could tell jokes in classical Greek. At eight, he mastered calculus and at twelve could comprehend a text written for professional mathematicians. He made his first original contribution to mathematics at age 20 with a rigorous definition of ordinal numbers. He earned his diploma in chemical engineering and his doctoral degree in mathematics three years later, writing his dissertation on axiomatic set theory. Von Neumann went on to make numerous contributions to mathematics, economics, physics, and computer science. (Note: Several mathematicians were mental calculators when they were still children. Mental calculation is not to be confused with mathematics.)
- Lev Landau (1908–1968) was a Soviet physicist who mastered calculus by age 13. He graduated from the Baku Gymnasium aged only 13 in the same year. He wrote his first scientific paper at age 18 on molecular physics. Landau is today best known for his work on quantum mechanics, diamagnetism, thermodynamics, plasma physics, superfluidity, superconductivity. He won the Nobel Prize in Physics in 1962 for his contributions to condensed-matter physics. He also co-authored a series of textbooks with one of his students, Evgeny Lifshitz.
- Charles Fefferman (1949–) began university at 14 years of age and obtained his PhD in mathematics at 20. He was appointed a professor at the University of Chicago two years later and, at age 25, became a full professor at Princeton University. He is well-known for his work in modern mathematical analysis. He earned the Fields Medal in 1978.
- Noam David Elkies (1966–) graduated from the Stuyvesant High School in New York City at age 15. He then attended Columbia University, where he won the gold medal at the William Lowell Putnam Mathematical Competition at 16 and graduated at the top of his class in three years. At age 26, he became the youngest person ever to be granted tenure at Harvard University. He is an expert on elliptic curves. In addition, he is also a musician, playing at Harvard, and was a competitive chess player with the United States Chess Federation. He has a talent for composing and solving chess puzzles.
- Terence Tao (1975–) took high-school-level mathematics at age seven and matriculated at university two years later. At ten, he won a medal at the International Mathematical Olympiad, becoming one of the youngest individuals in history to have done so. He is one of only three children in the history of the Johns Hopkins Study of Exceptional Talent program to have achieved a score of 700 or greater on the SAT math section while just eight years old; Tao scored a 760. Julian Stanley, Director of the Study of Mathematically Precocious Youth, stated that Tao had the greatest mathematical reasoning ability he had found in years of intensive searching. Tao has since earned a MacArthur grant and a Fields Medal. He is an expert in multiple branches of mathematics, including harmonic analysis (with applications in data compression), partial differential equations, number theory, and combinatorics. One of his most famous results is the Green-Tao theorem (proven in collaboration with Ben Green), which pertains to the twin prime conjecture.
- Erik Demaine (1981–) was identified as a prodigy at the age of 7 and earned his PhD in computer science at 20. He is now a computer scientist at MIT. He is also an expert in the mathematics of origami.

== Medicine ==
- Balamurali Ambati is an American physician. He became a doctor at age 17.
- Sho Yano (1990–) is an American physician. He entered Loyola University at age 9 and graduated summa cum laude just three years later. At 13, he went on to the University of Chicago's Pritzker School of Medicine. He received a Ph.D. in molecular genetics and cell biology at 18 and also earned his MD from the University of Chicago at the age of 21.

== Humanities ==
=== Scholarship ===
- Jean-Philippe Baratier (1721–1740) by the age of nine knew French, German, Latin, Greek, and Hebrew and at the age of eleven published a scholarly translation of a medieval work. He was admitted as a foreign member of the Prussian Academy of Sciences and received a master of arts degree at the age of 14. He submitted two proposals for calculating longitude at the same age. By the time of his death at the age of 19, he was said to have touched upon nearly every scholarly field of the time.
- Christian Heinrich Heineken (1721–1725), known as the "infant scholar of Lübeck", was able to read the Pentateuch at the age of one, and read the Old and New Testaments in Latin between the ages of two and three. He recited the history of Denmark in front of the Danish king in Copenhagen at the age of three. He died at the age of four.
- Karl Witte (1800–1883) at the age of nine knew—in addition to his native German—French, Italian, Latin, English, and Greek, and read classic works in those languages. In the same year, he was matriculated at the University of Leipzig. He earned a doctorate at age 13 and became a Doctor of Laws at the age of 16, when he joined the teaching staff of the University of Berlin. He later became a notable scholar of Dante.

== The arts ==
=== Literature ===
- William Cullen Bryant (1794–1878) published his first poem at the age of 10; at the age of 13 years, he published a book of political satire poems.
- Daisy Ashford (1881–1972) at age nine wrote a novel titled The Young Visiters. She continued writing until she was 13.
- Winifred Sackville Stoner Jr. (1902–1983) learned to speak Esperanto as a five-year-old and since the age of six had written and submitted rhymes to newspapers and magazines. By the age of nine she had three books published: one in verse, one in prose, and one in Esperanto, and wrote another two. At the same age she was said to be knowledgeable in "history, Latin, literature, geography, physiology, and rhetoric" and was an adept chess player. Her mother claimed when she was 12 that she could "express her thoughts in six tongues and read or write in eight" and had written ten books.
- Minou Drouet (b. 1947) caught the notice of French critics at the age of eight, leading to speculation that her mother was the true author of her poetry. She later proved herself to be the author.
- Nika Turbina (1974–2002) recited her poetry publicly to a national audience as an eight-year-old. She had a cycle of her poetry published in the same year, and a collection of her poems published when she was 10.

=== Visual arts ===
- Edmund Thomas Clint (1976–1983) was an Indian child prodigy. He is known for having drawn over 25,000 paintings, though he lived to be just six years and 11 months old.
- Wang Yani (b. 1975) began painting at two, and her work was exhibited at the age of 4. She became the youngest artist to have a solo exhibition in the Smithsonian at the age of 14. By the time she was 16, she painted upwards of 10,000 paintings in a Chinese watercolor style.

== Games ==
=== Chess ===
A chess prodigy is a young child who possesses an aptitude for chess that far exceeds what might be expected at their age. Their prodigious talent will often enable them to defeat experienced adult players and even titled chess masters. Some chess prodigies have progressed to become grandmasters or even World Chess Champions.

In 1950, FIDE introduced the titles of international master (IM) and grandmaster (GM). One measure of chess prodigies is the age at which they earn each of these titles. In the below tables, the ages listed are the ages at which a player qualified for a title. This is not equal to the age at which they officially earned the title, because GM and IM titles can only be awarded at FIDE congresses. The country listed indicates the federation the player was affiliated with at the time of gaining the title, not their current or later affiliation.

=== Go ===
- Sumire Nakamura (b. 2009) was competing in national Go tournaments in Japan by the time she was seven, and became the youngest professional go player at age 10 in 2019.

== Other ==
Some children become famous and are called a prodigy although it is questionable whether they have produced meaningful output to the level of an adult expert professional.

- Arden Hayes (born 2008) who as a five-year old appeared in newspapers and television shows because of his ability to memorize information about certain topics.
- 2nd Karmapa, Karma Pakshi child prodigy of Tibetan Buddhist religion who already acquired a broad understanding of Dharma philosophy and meditation by the age of 10.

== See also ==
- List of fictional child prodigies
- Lists of child actors
- List of child sportspeople
