= List of fictional child prodigies =

Child prodigies, and children who have exceptional talents, are frequently featured in entertainment media. This article indicates some examples of characters cited as child prodigies in such media.

== In anime and manga ==
- Radical Edward, an eccentric teenage hacker girl from the Cowboy Bebop animated series.

== In comics ==
- Adhemar, son of Nero in the eponymous Belgian comic strip series The Adventures of Nero is a five year old who is so intelligent that he teaches at both the University of Oxford and University of Cambridge. He has his own laboratory in Kobbegem and invents numerous new inventions, including rockets, medicines, robots, and atomic formulae.
- Dilton Doiley from the Archie comic book series is the smartest teenager in Riverdale and is an amateur inventor.
- Génial Olivier, the main protagonist of the eponymous Belgian comic strip series by Jacques Devos is a boy genius whose inventions drive the plot of many of his stories.
- Kakashi Hatake, introduced as the trainer of Naruto, Sakura, and Sasuke, was a child prodigy who graduated the ninja academy at age 5, becoming a full-fledged ninja at age 12.
- In the manga and anime Fullmetal Alchemist, both Edward Elric and Winry Rockbell are noted as being child prodigies, Edward for performing advanced alchemy at age 11, and Winry for becoming a skilled automail (cybernetic prosthetics) mechanic at the same age. Edward's brother Alphonse also performed the same alchemy with Ed at age 10, but most people who do not know him well do not realize that he is a child.
- Edison Lee, a boy genius in The Brilliant Mind of Edison Lee by John Hambrock.

== In literature ==
- In the 1935 science-fiction novel Odd John by Olaf Stapledon, John Wainwright is a superintelligent child whose exceptionality leads to conflict with the surrounding society.
- In the 1988 novel Matilda by Roald Dahl, the eponymous Matilda Wormwood, is, according to BBC News, "a child prodigy who [is] unloved by her parents."
- In Evil Genius, Genius Squad, and Genius Wars by Catherine Jinks, Cadel Piggot is a child genius who enrolls in a "University of Evil".
- In the 1985 novel Ender's Game, Andrew "Ender" Wiggin, Bean, Petra Arkanian, and a group of also exceptionally talented child geniuses known as "Ender's jeesh" are recruited by an organization known as the International Fleet in order to unknowingly command fleets against an alien species to save the Earth.
- In the series Artemis Fowl of books by Eoin Colfer, Artemis Fowl II starts as a 12-year-old child prodigy and ages throughout the series.
- In the works of J. D. Salinger (Nine Stories, Franny and Zooey, Raise High the Roof Beam, Carpenters and Seymour: An Introduction), the children in the Glass family are considered to be child prodigies. All seven children appeared on the radio quiz show "It's a Wise Child."
- In Harry Potter, Severus Snape is described as a former child prodigy who, as a bullied teenager, briefly sides with series antagonist Voldemort.
- Lord Voldemort, the most powerful sorcerer in the Harry Potter universe, second to Albus Dumbledore. He was the most brilliant student who ever went to Hogwarts.
- In the Legend trilogy written by Marie Lu, June Iparis is described as a child prodigy, having scored full on her Republic's Trial.
- In Genius: The Game, Rex, a genius programmer and hacker, Tunde, engineer who created his small Nigerian village's solar power tower, and Cai, a blogger who is a master of disguise, set to expose underhand Chinese government deals, are all kids under eighteen invited to participate in 'THE GAME', where 200 of the world's brightest minds will face challenges set by Kiran Biswes, the young CEO of a company named "OndScan".
- In the series The Mysterious Benedict Society, the main characters Reynie Muldoon, George "Sticky" Washington, Kate Wetherall, and Constance Contraire have been described as child prodigies.
- In The School for Gifted Potentials series, Everett is identified as highly gifted despite purposely scoring low on the entrance test. Students either enroll in the school from birth by gifted parents or are invited by “Observers”.
- High School Prodigies Have It Easy Even In Another World is light novel also developed into a manga and an anime, about seven child prodigies sent to a fantasy world.
- In the 1983 novel The Queen's Gambit, Beth Harmon is a chess prodigy who also excels at school.

== In films ==
- Billy Elliot (played by Jamie Bell) in Billy Elliot (2000), a dance prodigy.
- Anakin Skywalker, in The Phantom Menace (1999), is a 9-year-old boy who is a brilliant pilot, technician, mechanic and engineer.
- Harold Wormser, Revenge of the Nerds (1984). A twelve-year-old child prodigy in the first film, reluctantly went into college by his parents at first, but was accepted among his fellow misfits and was helpful in many of their capers against the rival campus jocks that bullied them in the film series.
- Dade Murphy, Hackers (1995). He hacked and crashed exactly 1,507 systems of the New York Stock Exchange at the age of 11.
- Tony Stark, Iron Man (2008). He built his first circuit board at age 6, his first engine (a V8) at 8 and graduated summa cum laude from the Massachusetts Institute of Technology (MIT) at 17.
- Fred Tate, Little Man Tate (1991). A particularly clever young boy suffers from burnout.
- Stanley Spector, Magnolia (1999). The character is an eminent contestant on the quiz show What Do Kids Know? His greedy father capitalizes off of his son's success and constantly pressures him to win. The emotional distress that this pressure, along with alienation from society caused by being perceived as an amusing object, eventually becomes evident.
- The Royal Tenenbaums (2001) concerns "a family composed of three child prodigies".
- Jamal Wallace, Finding Forrester (2000), is a genius teenager.
- August (played by Freddie Highmore) in August Rush (2007) possesses a deep understanding of the concept of music and a musical talent far exceeding his adult peers, including his parents. In the film, he is capable of creating, mastering, and performing his own symphony in front of thousands.
- Gil Yepes (voiced by Ben Whishaw) in The Prodigies (2011) is a 13 year old abused and bullied child living in New Mexico with the ability to control people's minds who is picked up by Jimbo after winning and finishing a test on the Killian Network's online game "The Game", Gil then participates in a game show called "American Genius" organized by the Killian Network, but after the sexual assault inflicted to one of his friends, Liza, he grows into an aggressive and power-hungry villain with justifiable motives towards the people who hurt or failed on them and tries to get his revenge on Jimbo Farrar after being betrayed by him by almost brutally killing his wife Ann and their pregnant baby. He also serves as the main antagonist of the film.
- Nathan in A Brilliant Young Mind (2014) is a mathematical prodigy. Comprehending to love as imaginary, he ignores initially his mother's caring behaviour. When he falls in love, he understands that love is not bound to any formula.
- Hiro Hamada (voiced by Ryan Potter) in Big Hero 6 (2014) is a robotics genius that graduated from high school early, and was admitted to university at the San Fransokyo Institute of Technology at the age of 14.
- Mary Adler (played by Mckenna Grace) in Gifted (2017) is a mathematical prodigy whose late mother was a mathematician. She expressed an interest in solving the Navier-Stokes existence and smoothness problem which her mother was working on.
- Sammy Fabelman (played by Gabriel LaBelle) in The Fabelmans (2022), a young aspiring teenage filmmaker. He is loosely based on Steven Spielberg, the film's director.

== In television ==
- In Family Matters, the family's neighbor is child genius, ne'er-do-well nerd, and breakout star Steve Urkel.
- In The Sarah Jane Adventures, Sarah Jane's adopted son Luke is a child prodigy with the ability to remember numbers with over 20 digits after only a glance beforehand.
- In Code Lyoko, Jeremy Belpois is a child genius and an expert in quantum physics and science. At 11, he builds a time machine and could create a materialization program that teleports humans into a virtual plane. It is also shown that he can easily create a clone of himself and his friends, and knows Morse code. Aelita, who was believed to be a humanoid virtual being, is exceptionally gifted due to being the daughter of computer scientist Franz Hopper, the creator of the quantum supercomputer, the virtual world Lyoko, and X.A.N.A. himself.
- In Code Lyoko: Evolution, Jeremie Belpois seems to have met his match with the appearance of girl-genius Laura Gauthier.
- In Family Guy, Stewie Griffin is portrayed as a child prodigy already as a baby.
- In Smart Guy, T.J Henderson (played by Tahj Mowry) skips 6 grades and goes straight from 4th grade to 10th grade. T.J deals with the trial and tribulations of a kid in high school. He joins his 16-year-old brother Marcus (played by Jason Weaver) and his friend Mo (played by Omar Gooding).
- In Young Sheldon, (prequel of The Big Bang Theory) Sheldon Cooper (played by Iain Armitage in Young Sheldon and Jim Parsons in The Big Bang Theory) has an IQ of 187 and an eidetic memory. He went to college when he was 11, started post graduate study at 14 at the California Institute of Technology (CalTech), and received his Ph.D. when he was 16. When he was 14, Sheldon tested out lasers and the college teacher who saw was shushed by the government. During his time at College, Sheldon was introduced to Paige Swanson (played by Mckenna Grace), a fellow child prodigy who was taking the same class as Sheldon. Paige's trajectory in academia took a downhill after "preteen rebellion" as her result of her parents divorce in which she was made to attend a Bible Camp to refined herself. Paige eventually returned to academia, eclipsing work done by Sheldon. Thought unlikely Sheldon, she struggled with being the youngest on their respective teams by a number of years. In Sheldon's adult life, in the episode "The Jerusalem Duality", Dennis Kim, a 15-year-old physics child prodigy tours CalTech and clashes with Sheldon when the former excels the latter in every way.
- In CSI, there are two episodes (The Unusual Suspect and Goodbye and Good Luck) where the character of Hannah West, a 12-year-old child prodigy, appears. In the first episode, she was in senior year in high school, and in the second (two years later), she was already a teacher's assistant in college.
- In Breakout Kings, Lloyd Lowery (Jimmi Simpson) is a former child prodigy who graduated high school at 12, college at 16, and medical school at 20. He has an IQ of 210.
- In Doogie Howser, M.D., the title character is a child prodigy who has graduated from medical school and practices medicine.
- In the television show Firefly, the character of River Tam (played by Summer Glau) is shown as a prodigy throughout the show, having started to correct her elder brother's spelling at an early age, as well as seeing flaws and "fallacious conclusions" in one of his textbooks. She is also able of feats such as calculating in her head a course for the show's spaceship destination.
- In the television show Heroes, Micah Sanders is a computer hacker who is a child prodigy.
- In the television show Criminal Minds, one of the main characters, the socially awkward Spencer Reid (played by Matthew Gray Gubler) is a former child prodigy who has an IQ of 187, an eidetic memory, and can read 20,000 words per minute. He graduated from high school at the age of 12, and between the ages of 16 and 21, he received three doctorates (mathematics, chemistry, and engineering), and two bachelor's degrees (psychology, and sociology). He joined the BAU at 22, and currently works on a team who catch criminals through behavioral profiling. He has shown hints of schizophrenia, and is speculated of having Autism Spectrum Disorder.
- In the television show </Scorpion>, Ralph Dineen (played by Riley Smith), is a child prodigy with autism and son of Paige Dineen, a woman employed to the "</Scorpion>" branch of homeland security, a branch dedicated to solving global problems. Paige, a woman of average intelligence in a team of otherwise geniuses was employed to help the rest of the team better connected to the general public, and due to a lack of child care often bring her son to the office where his genius is discovered by the </Scorpion> after helping out on a number of cases. The leader of </Scorpion>, Walter O'Brien (played by Elyes Gabel; and inspired by a real life genius of the same name), appears numerous times in the show as his young self (played by Daniel Zolghadri during flashbacks.
- In the TV show Numb3rs, one of the main characters, Charlie Eppes (played by David Krumholtz), is a child prodigy. At the age of three he was multiplying four digit numbers in his head. At age 13 he started attending Princeton University and graduated at age 16. He now helps his brother Don solve cases for the FBI.
- In the TV series The Pretender (1996–2000), the main character, Jarod, is a former child prodigy who, as an adult, is capable of emulating any person within various fields of work or situations with only a minimal amount of research.
- In Star Trek: The Next Generation, Wesley Crusher was a child prodigy who was not well received by fans of the show.
- In the TV series Buck Rogers in the 25th Century, the 11-year-old Gary Coleman of Diff'rent Strokes plays genius Hieronymus Fox.
- In the TV series 227, Countess Vaughn plays the Jenkins' houseguest Alexanderia Dewitt, an 11-year-old child prodigy with an I.Q. of 195 and a college freshman.
- In seaQuest DSV, Lucas Wolenczak is a child prodigy who graduated from Stanford magna cum laude with a degree in Applied Principles of Artificial Intelligence. He left Stanford in the middle of his Ph.D. to become a member of the science crew aboard seaQuest at 16. His GPA record was never broken, even after 15-plus years.
- In The Adventures of Jimmy Neutron: Boy Genius, the titular character is a fifth grader whose IQ is off the charts, and, in one episode, went to college at age ten.
- In Max Headroom, Bryce Lynch is the 16-year-old techno-wiz who runs the Research and Development department at Network 23. Not only did he create Max himself out the mind of reporter Edison Carter, but he is credited in the film book of the original movie as being the one responsible for Network 23's rise to power.
- In The Loud House, Lisa Loud is the four-year-old child prodigy of the Loud family who speaks in scientific terms.
- In Mr. Young, Adam Young is a 14-year-old high school science teacher who attended college at age 9.
- In The Simpsons, Lisa Simpson is an 8-year-old girl who excels at academics, and music, particularly jazz.
- In The Simpsons, Martin Prince is an 10-year-old boy in Bart's school classes who excels at math and science and is often bullied for his genius. He is reported to have an IQ of 216.
- In Dexter's Laboratory, Dexter is a boy genius with a secret laboratory who went to college at 10 years of age.
- In Johnny Test, identical redheaded twins Susan and Mary Test are 13-year-old girl geniuses.
- In Your Lie in April Kousei Arima performs as a piano player with an orchestra when 8 years old
- In Peppa Pig, Edmond Elephant, the younger brother of Emily Elephant, is a child genius, (called a "clever clog" in the series) at just 2 years old.
- In Power Rangers: Turbo, Justin Stewart (played by Blake Foster) is the Blue Turbo Ranger and the youngest human Power Ranger in the franchise, debuting at 12 years old. He is a child prodigy with an intellect far surpassing his peers, which allowed him to skip ahead to the ninth grade at Angel Grove High School
- In My Little Pony: Friendship is Magic, Twilight Sparkle is Princess Celestia’s pupil at the School for Gifted Unicorns, having an exceptional talent in magic.
- In Avatar: The Last Airbender, Azula (voiced by Grey DeLisle) is the daughter of fire lord Ozai. She is an exceptionally skilled firebender and excels at school.
- In Avatar: The Last Airbender, Toph Beifong (voiced originally by Michaela Jill Murphy, in the movie by Kate Higgins and in The Legend of Korra by Philece Sampler), is a teacher of the protagonist and member of a wealthy elite family. As a young child she temporarily escaped from her house to learn earthbending from the original source, badgermoles. After that she got lots of fighting experience secretly and was able to defeat the most skilled benders by the age of twelve. She also has an ability called seismic sense which allows her to see better than others with her feet. Her strong areas in earthbending are impressively diverse and in addition to that she invented a completely new style which was previously thought of as impossible.
- In Avatar: The Last Airbender the protagonist Aang (voiced originally by Zach Tyler Eisen, in the movie by Eric Nam and in The Legend Of Korra by D.B. Sweeney) is able to defeat trained adults in combat at the age of twelve. He also mastered airbending very young, invented a new technique and had natural talent with other elements.
- In The Legend of Korra, Aang's granddaughter Jinora (voiced by Kiernan Shipka) has the strongest spiritual powers in the entire franchise. She also mastered airbending young.

== In video games ==
- Bowser Jr. (Super Mario series) — Despite being a child, he is incredibly strong and agile as well as very intelligent, able to build machines and hack computer systems. Additionally, he is a prince with exceptional leadership skills.
- Ciel (Mega Man Zero series) - A biology engineering prodigious scientist with a very high IQ who built the "fake" X and founder of Neo Arcadia at age five-six.

== See also ==
- List of child prodigies
- List of films about mathematicians
