= William James Sidis =

American child prodigy (1898–1944)

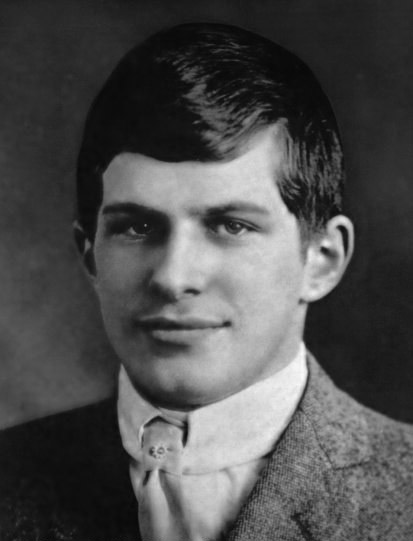
- Sidis at his Harvard graduation (1914)
- Born: April 1, 1898; Boston, Massachusetts, U.S.
- Died: July 17, 1944 (aged 46); Boston, Massachusetts, U.S.
- Other names: John W. Shattuck; Frank Folupa; Parker Greene; Jacob Marmor
- Education: Harvard University (BA, 1914)
- Employer: Rice Institute
- Notable work: The Animate and the Inanimate (1925); The Tribes and the States (c. 1935)

William James Sidis (/ˈsaɪdɪs/; April 1, 1898 – July 17, 1944) was an American child prodigy with mathematical and linguistic skills. He was active as a mathematician, linguist, historian, and author. He wrote the book The Animate and the Inanimate, published in 1925, in which he speculated about the origin of life in the context of thermodynamics. His works were published under various pseudonyms, as he never used his real name as an author.

His father, the psychologist Boris Sidis, raised his son according to certain principles with the desire for his son to be gifted. Sidis became famous first for his precocity and later for his eccentricity and withdrawal from public life. Eventually, he avoided mathematics altogether, writing on other subjects under a number of pseudonyms. He entered Harvard University at age 11 and, as an adult, was claimed by family members to have an IQ between 250 and 300, and to be conversant in about 25 languages and dialects. These statements have not been verified, but many of his contemporaries, including Norbert Wiener and Daniel Frost Comstock, agreed that he was extremely intelligent. He retreated from public life after being arrested and tried for his presence at a socialist parade and died young from a brain hemorrhage.

== Biography ==
=== Parents and upbringing (1898–1908) ===
Sidis was born to Jewish emigrants from the Russian Empire (now Ukraine), on April 1, 1898, in Boston, Massachusetts. His father, Boris Sidis, had emigrated in 1887 to escape political and antisemitic persecution. His mother, Sarah (Mandelbaum) Sidis, and her family had fled the pogroms in the late 1880s. She attended Boston University and graduated from its School of Medicine in 1897. William was named after his godfather, Boris's friend and colleague, the American philosopher William James. Boris was a psychiatrist and published many books and articles, performing pioneering work in abnormal psychology. Boris was also a polyglot.

Sidis' parents believed in nurturing a precocious and fearless love of knowledge, although their methods of parenting were criticized in the media and retrospectively. Sidis could read the New York Times at 18 months. By age eight, he had reportedly taught himself eight languages (Latin, Greek, French, Russian, German, Hebrew, Turkish, and Armenian) and invented another, which he called "Vendergood".

=== Harvard University (1909–1914) ===
Although the university had previously refused to let his father enroll him at age 9 because he was still a child, in 1909, at age 11, Sidis set a record by becoming the youngest person to enroll at Harvard University. In early 1910, Sidis' mastery of higher mathematics was such that he lectured the Harvard Mathematical Club on four-dimensional bodies, attracting nationwide attention. Notable child prodigy and cybernetics pioneer Norbert Wiener, who attended Harvard at the time and knew Sidis, wrote in his book Ex-Prodigy: "The talk would have done credit to a first or second-year graduate student of any age...talk represented the triumph of the unaided efforts of a very brilliant child." MIT physics professor Daniel F. Comstock was full of praises: "Karl Friedrich Gauss is the only example in history, of all prodigies, whom Sidis resembles. I predict that young Sidis will be a great astronomical mathematician. He will evolve new theories and invent new ways of calculating astronomical phenomena. I believe he will be a great mathematician, the leader in that science in the future." Sidis began taking a full-time course load in 1910 and earned his Bachelor of Arts degree, cum laude, on June 18, 1914, at age 16, earning a mixture of A, B and C grades.

Shortly after graduation, Sidis told reporters: "I want to live the perfect life. The only way to live the perfect life is to live it in seclusion". He granted an interview to a reporter from the Boston Herald. The paper reported Sidis' vows to remain celibate and never to marry, as he said women did not appeal to him. Later he developed a strong affection for Martha Foley, and enrolled at Harvard Graduate School of Arts and Sciences.

=== Teaching at Rice University and Harvard Law School (1915–1919) ===
After a group of Harvard students physically threatened Sidis, his parents secured him a job at the William Marsh Rice Institute for the Advancement of Letters, Science, and Art (now Rice University) in Houston, Texas, as a mathematics teaching assistant. He arrived at Rice in December 1915 at age 17. He was a graduate fellow working toward his doctorate.

Sidis taught three classes: Euclidean geometry, non-Euclidean geometry, and freshman math (he wrote a textbook for the Euclidean geometry course in Greek). After less than a year, frustrated with the department, his teaching requirements, and his treatment by students older than himself, he left his position and returned to New England. When a friend later asked him why he had left, he replied, "I never knew why they gave me the job in the first place—I'm not much of a teacher. I didn't leave: I was asked to go." Sidis abandoned his pursuit of a graduate degree in mathematics and enrolled at Harvard Law School in September 1916, but withdrew in good standing in his final year in March 1919.

=== Politics and arrest (1919–1921) ===
In 1919, shortly after his withdrawal from law school, Sidis was arrested for participating in a socialist May Day parade in Boston that turned violent. He was sentenced to 18 months in prison under the Sedition Act of 1918 by Roxbury Municipal Court Judge Albert F. Hayden. Sidis' arrest was featured prominently in newspapers, as his early graduation from Harvard had garnered considerable local celebrity status. During the trial, Sidis said he had been a conscientious objector to the World War I draft, was a socialist, and did not believe in a god like the "big boss of the Christians", but rather in something that is in a way apart from a human being. He later developed his own libertarian philosophy based on individual rights and "the American social continuity". His father arranged with the district attorney to keep Sidis out of prison before his appeal came to trial; instead, his parents held him in their sanatorium in New Hampshire for a year. They took him to California, where he spent another year. At the sanatorium, his parents set about "reforming" him and threatened him with transfer to an insane asylum.

=== Later life (1921–1944) ===
After returning to the East Coast in 1921, Sidis was determined to live an independent and private life. He only took work running adding machines or other fairly menial tasks. He worked in New York City and became estranged from his parents. It took years before he was legally cleared to return to Massachusetts, and he was concerned for years about his risk of arrest. He obsessively collected streetcar transfers, wrote self-published periodicals, and taught small circles of interested friends his version of American history. In 1933, Sidis passed a Civil Service exam in New York, but scored a low ranking of 254. In a private letter, Sidis wrote that this was "not so encouraging". In 1935, he wrote an unpublished manuscript, The Tribes and the States, which traces Native American contributions to American democracy.

In 1937, in an article in The New Yorker titled "Where Are They Now?", James Thurber pseudonymously described Sidis' life as lonely, in a "hall bedroom in Boston's shabby South End". In response, Sidis sued, alleging it contained many false statements. Lower courts had dismissed Sidis as a public figure with no right to challenge personal publicity. He lost an appeal on the invasion of privacy lawsuit at the United States Court of Appeals for the Second Circuit in 1940. Judge Charles Edward Clark expressed sympathy for Sidis, who claimed that the publication had exposed him to "public scorn, ridicule, and contempt" and caused him "grievous mental anguish [and] humiliation", but found that the court was not disposed to "afford to all the intimate details of private life an absolute immunity from the prying of the press".

The libel portion of the lawsuit however was allowed to continue, and Sidis eventually settled with The New Yorker for $3,000.

Sidis died of a cerebral hemorrhage in 1944 in Boston at age 46.

== Writing and research ==
Sidis's writing covered a broad range of subjects. He wrote about cosmology, Native American history, and rail transportation, and invented a language called Vendergood. In The Animate and the Inanimate (1925), Sidis predicted the existence of regions of space where the second law of thermodynamics operates in the reverse temporal direction of our local area. The Tribes and the States (c. 1935) purports to give a history of the settlement of the Americas from prehistoric times to 1828.

Sidis was a "peridromophile", a term he coined for people fascinated with transportation research and streetcar systems. He wrote a treatise on streetcar transfers, Notes on the Collection of Transfers, that identified means of increasing public transport usage. In 1930, Sidis received a patent for a rotary perpetual calendar that took into account leap years.

For this work, he was invited to speak at the inaugural "genius meeting" in 1926, hosted by Winifred Sackville Stoner's League for Fostering Genius in Tuckahoe, New York.

=== The Animate and the Inanimate ===
Sidis wrote The Animate and the Inanimate to elaborate his thoughts on the origin of life, cosmology, and the potential reversibility of the second law of thermodynamics through Maxwell's demon, among other things. It was published in 1925, but it has been suggested that Sidis was working on the theory as early as 1916. One motivation for the theory appears to be to explain psychologist and philosopher William James's "reserve energy" theory, which proposed that people subjected to extreme conditions could use "reserve energy". Sidis' own "forced prodigy" upbringing was a result of testing the theory. The work is one of the few that Sidis did not write under a pseudonym.

In The Animate and the Inanimate, Sidis writes that the universe is infinite and contains sections of "negative tendencies" where the laws of physics are reversed, juxtaposed with "positive tendencies", which swap over epochs of time. He writes that there was no "origin of life": life has always existed and has only changed through evolution. Sidis adopted Eduard Pflüger's cyanogen-based life theory, and cites "organic" things such as almonds that have cyanogen that does not kill. Because cyanogen is normally highly toxic, almonds are a strange anomaly. Sidis describes his theory as a fusion of the mechanistic model of life and the vitalist model, as well as entertaining the notion that life came to Earth from asteroids (as advanced by Lord Kelvin and Hermann von Helmholtz). Sidis also writes that functionally speaking, stars are "alive" and undergo an eternally repeating light-dark cycle, reversing the second law in the dark portion of the cycle.

Sidis' theory was ignored upon release, only to be found in an attic in 1979. Upon this discovery, Buckminster Fuller (who was a classmate of Sidis) wrote in a letter to Gerard Piel:

Imagine my excitement and joy on being handed this xerox of Sidis' 1925 book, in which he clearly predicts the black hole. In fact, I find his whole book The Animate and the Inanimate to be a fine cosmological piece. I find him focusing on the same subjects that fascinate me, and coming to about the same conclusions as those I have published in SYNERGETICS, and will be publishing in SYNERGETICS Volume II, which has already gone to the press. As a Harvard man of a generation later, I hope you will become as excited as I am at this discovery that Sidis did go on after college to do the most magnificent thinking and writing.

=== The Tribes and the States ===
The Tribes and the States was written around 1935 but never completed, and remained unpublished at the time of Sidis' death. It is Sidis' history of Native Americans, focusing on the Northeastern tribes and continuing to the mid-19th century. He wrote it under the pseudonym "John W. Shattuck". Much of the history was taken from wampum belts; Sidis explained, "The weaving of wampum belts is a sort of writing by means of belts of colored beads, in which the various designs of beads denoted different ideas according to a definitely accepted system, which could be read by anyone acquainted with wampum language, irrespective of what the spoken language is. Records and treaties are kept in this manner, and individuals could write letters to one another in this way." Much of the book is centered on Native Americans' influence on migrating Europeans and the formation of the United States. It describes the origin of the federations that were important to the Founding Fathers. Sidis suggests that "there were red men at one time in Europe as well as in America".

=== Vendergood language ===
Sidis created a constructed language called Vendergood in his second book, the Book of Vendergood, which he wrote at age 7. While biographer Amy Wallace briefly described the language and manuscript, the whole work is not publicly available. The language was mostly based on Latin and Greek, but also drew on German and French and other Romance languages. It distinguished between eight moods: indicative, potential, imperative absolute, subjunctive, imperative, infinitive, optative, and Sidis' own "strongeable". One of its chapters is titled "Imperfect and Future Indicative Active". Other parts explain the origin of Roman numerals. It uses base 12 instead of base 10:

- eis – 'one'
- duet – 'two'
- tre – 'three'
- guar – 'four'
- quin – 'five'
- sex – 'six'
- sep – 'seven'
- oo (oe?) – 'eight'
- non – 'nine'
- ecem – 'ten'
- elevenos – 'eleven'
- dec – 'twelve'
- eidec (eis, dec) – 'thirteen'

Most of the examples are presented in the form of tests:

1. 'The bowman obscures.' = The toxoteis obscurit.
2. 'I am learning Vendergood.' = (Euni) disceuo Vendergood.
3. 'What do you learn?' (sing.). = Quen diseois-nar?
4. 'I obscure ten farmers.' = Obscureuo ecem agrieolai.

== Legacy ==
After his death, Sidis' sister Helena said that he had an IQ "the very highest that had ever been obtained", as reported in Abraham Sperling's 1946 book Psychology for the Millions. Sperling wrote:

Helena Sidis told me that a few years before his death, her brother Bill took an intelligence test with a psychologist. His score was the very highest that had ever been obtained. In terms of I. Q., the psychologist related that the figure would be between 250 and 300. Late in life William Sidis took general intelligence tests for Civil Service positions in New York and Boston. His phenomenal ratings are a matter of record.

It has been acknowledged that Helena and William's mother Sarah had a reputation for exaggerated statements about her family. Helena may have falsely stated that the Civil Service exam William took in 1933 was an IQ test and that his ranking of 254 was an IQ score of 254. It is speculated that the number "254" was actually William's placement on the list after he passed the Civil Service exam, as he wrote in a letter to his family. Helena also said: "Billy knew all the languages in the world, while my father only knew twenty-seven. I wonder if there were any Billy didn't know." This statement was not backed by any source outside the Sidis family, and Sarah Sidis also made the improbable statement in her 1950 book The Sidis Story that William could learn a language in just one day.

Sidis' life and work, particularly his ideas about Native Americans, are extensively discussed in Robert M. Pirsig's book Lila: An Inquiry into Morals (1991). Sidis is also discussed in Wiener's autobiography, Ex-Prodigy.

In fiction, the Danish author Morten Brask's novel The Perfect Life of William Sidis (2011) is based on Sidis' life. Another novel based on Sidis' life was written by the German author Klaus Caesar Zehrer in 2017.

=== In education discussions ===
Sidis' upbringing emphasized intellectual pursuits at the expense of other qualities. In 1909, The New York Times derisively portrayed Sidis as "a wonderfully successful result of a scientific forcing experiment".

Criticism of his father's child-rearing methods occurred within a larger discourse about the best way to educate children. Most educators of the day believed that schools should expose children to common experiences to create good citizens. Most psychologists thought intelligence was hereditary, a position that precluded early childhood education at home.

The difficulties Sidis encountered in dealing with the social structure of a collegiate setting may have shaped opinion against allowing such children to rapidly advance through higher education in his day. Research indicates that a challenging curriculum can relieve social and emotional difficulties gifted children commonly experience.

== Bibliography ==
- Passaconaway in the White Mountains (1916) writing as Charles Edward Beals, Jr.
- The Animate and the Inanimate (1925)
- Notes on the Collection of Transfers (1926) writing as Frank Folupa
- The Tribes and the States (c. 1935) (PDF file) writing as John W. Shattuck
