= Winifred Sackville Stoner =

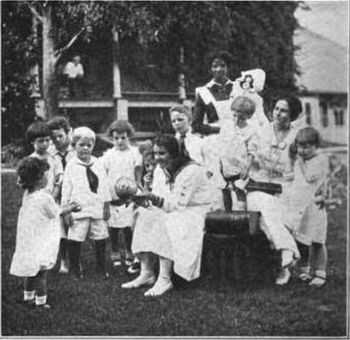
Winifred Sackville Stoner and her pupils (1916)

Winifred Sackville Stoner (1883–1931) was an educator, the founder of three schools of "Natural Education". She was the mother of Winifred Sackville Stoner Jr. (1902–1983), a child prodigy.

== Biography ==
Although the year of her birth has not been confirmed, what is known is that Winifred Sackville was married, in Buffalo, New York, on February 3, 1900, to James Buchanan Stoner. Their daughter, Winifred Sackville Stoner Jr., was born in 1902, perhaps in Evansville, Indiana. The younger Stoner's intelligence was recognized at an early age. She could use a typewriter by age six, and could speak between six and 13 languages by age ten. She passed the Stanford University and University of Wisconsin–Madison entrance exams, at age nine. She learned to play the violin and piano at a young age, and won several chess tournaments, as well.

Mother Stoner believed that learning should be fun and exciting and should appeal to all of the senses. She encouraged the use of toys and typewriters, which she thought "liberating" for young children. At this time, Mrs. Stoner was publishing books of verse and local histories. She was an advocate of Esperanto, the universal language that had been developed in 1897; in 1910, at the age of eight, the daughter produced a translation of Mother Goose in Esperanto. In 1916, the Bobbs-Merrill Company in Indianapolis published the elder Stoner's Manual of Natural Education.

By the mid-1920s, the Stoners had relocated to New York City, where, according to The New York Times, they lived at 418 Central Park West, in a building named "The Braender", after the builder, German-born Philip Braender. Mother and daughter continued to publish works during the 1920s, including a monthly pamphlet, "Mother Stoner's Bulletin", which discussed the Stoner philosophy of education. In 1925, Mrs. Stoner founded the League for Fostering Genius).

Mother Stoner filed for at least two patents. She sold her 1920 patent for a candy wrapper to the Newark Paraffine & Parchement Paper Co. In 1923, she received patent no. 184693 for a powder for cleansing and softening the skin.

In 1927, mother and daughter set out on a trip through the United States and Western Europe, called a “genius hunt” by The New York Times. She sought to identify other gifted children for further study. According to The New York Times, Mrs. Stoner devised six classes of people. In ascending order of value, they were idiots; destructionists; morons; hypermorons (in which class she put most people); geniuses (who were creative); and progressionists (who could get things done in business and related fields). The last two, she thought, were the only ones "worth preserving," The Times reported.

Winifred Sackville Stoner died on November 23, 1931, at age 49, according to Woodlawn Cemetery (and according to Time Magazine), or at age 58, according to Heritage Quest Online. The cause was chronic nephritis (inflammation of the kidney).

== Selected works ==
- 1916, Manual of Natural Education
- "Mother Stoner's Bulletin"
