= Winifred Sackville Stoner Jr. =

American poet

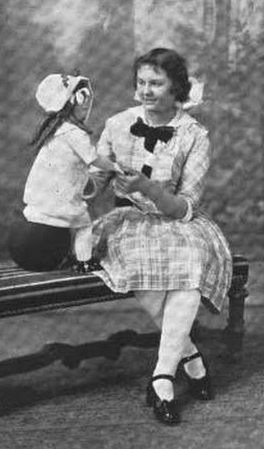
Winifred Sackville Stoner Jr., from a 1915 publication.

Winifred Sackville Stoner Jr. (1902–1983) was a prodigious American poet and child prodigy. Her development was heavily influenced by her mother and collaborator Winifred Sackville Stoner.

== Childhood ==
Winifred Sackville Stoner Jr. was born in Evansville, Indiana, the daughter of Winifred Sackville Stoner Sr. (ca. 1870–1931). "Mother Stoner", founder of the Natural Education movement, was an innovative educator who promoted the importance of fun in learning.

Mother Stoner's own child proved a successful learner in her own right. By age three, the younger Stoner could read and write capably; by six, she could use a typewriter and had had an illustrated book of her poems published; by eight, she spoke at least five languages and had translated Mother Goose into Esperanto ("Patrino Anserino"). At nine, she passed the entrance exams for Stanford University and the University of Wisconsin–Madison.

The two collaborated through the 1920s on a monthly promotional publication entitled "Mother Stoner's Bulletin".

== Mnemonic rhymes ==
Winifred Sackville Stoner Jr. is especially known for poems, rhymes and mnemonic jingles that aid in the recollection of information. One of her best known poems is entitled, The History of The U.S, which begins with the existing mnemonic of "In fourteen hundred ninety-two, Columbus sailed the ocean blue", which was known at least a decade before her birth, but extends it into a full poem which begins:

In fourteen hundred ninety-two, Columbus sailed the ocean blue
And found this land, land of the Free, beloved by you, beloved by me.

Stoner sought to popularize these informative poems against the "'unquestionably' evil influence exerted by popular nursery jingles upon infant minds." "Simple Simon", she said, encouraged stupidity, while "Jack Be Nimble" "puts ideas into children's heads" that could lead to injuring themselves. She hoped that her rhymes would replace those of Mother Goose.

== Personal life ==
Stoner's personal life did not see the same success as her intellectual life. In 1921, at age 19, she married a 35-year-old French count, Charles de Bruche, who was supposedly killed in a car accident in Mexico City in 1922. She then married Louis Hyman, but that marriage fell apart and ended in divorce in 1927.

However, de Bruche reappeared in 1930, and Stoner appealed for an annulment of the marriage. She apparently already knew before the faked death that her husband's actual name was Charles Clinton Philip Bruch, a penniless imposter with a criminal record who was a known con man and wiretapper, who also went by the name "Count Helmholtz". Reports surfaced of an engagement to Bainbridge Colby, a former US Secretary of State under President Woodrow Wilson, who was then 58 years old to her 24. She later described him as "my mental mate".

In 1931, she wed E. W. Harrison, but they divorced in 1933 amid Stoner's plans to wed for a fourth time.

Between the 1930s and her death in 1983, she rarely stepped into the spotlight.

== Sources ==
- "Winifred Sackville Stoner & Winifred Sackville Stoner Jr.: A Selected Bibliography" (PDF). Indiana Historical Society. 1994. Archived from the original (PDF) on September 24, 2015.
- McCutchan, Kenneth. "The Amazing Little Winifred".
- "Milestones: Aug. 1, 1927". Time. August 1, 1927. p. 1. Archived from the original on November 25, 2010.
- "Prodigy". 1928.
- "Chenophobes". 1925.
- "Winifred Sackville Stoner Jr". Archived from the original on June 6, 2011.
