= John Hambrock =

American cartoonist

- Born: John Hambrock; 1963 (age 62–63) Ft. Wayne, Indiana
- Areas: artist, writer
- Notable works: The Brilliant Mind of Edison Lee

John Hambrock is the creator of the comic strip The Brilliant Mind of Edison Lee. It first appeared in newspapers on November 12, 2006, and is syndicated worldwide by King Features Syndicate.

== Biography ==
John Hambrock was born and raised in Fort Wayne, Indiana. The youngest of 3 boys from a working class household, he would call Ft. Wayne his home until leaving for college at the age of 18. Hambrock did not have a career as a cartoonist in mind, initially during his early years it was marine biology. While he was interested in science, it was the arts in which he finally majored.

== Education ==
Hambrock was voted the most artistic male in his senior class in High School. He then attended Indiana University. He has a degree in Graphic Design, from the Ringling School of Art and Design in Sarasota, Florida.

== Recognition ==
While in college, John and a team of four other student team members won first place in the Philip Morris National Marketing Competition for college students. His creative team was honored at the headquarters of Philip Morris in New York City. He also received numerous industry awards during his years as a Graphic Designer, both in Chicago and in Wisconsin.

== Career ==
In 1985, soon after finishing college, he was recruited by James Courtenay James, Inc., a small design agency in Chattanooga, Tennessee. In 1986 he moved to Chicago and went to work for The Hirsch Design Group, a mid-sized loop design firm.

John left Hirsch after 10 years to start his agency, In-House Communications. His company specializes in industrial advertising, packaging and print design, with a client list that includes major industrial and retail manufacturers, as well as one of the country's leading law firms.

== Family ==
In 1986, Hambrock married Anne, whom he had known since high school. Anne became the driving force in helping him achieve success in his cartooning career. Anne colors the Edison Lee comic strips. They have two sons and a daughter, and continue to draw inspiration from their family interactions.

== The Brilliant Mind of Edison Lee ==
While at The Hirsch Design Group, John had the opportunity to work on the Keebler cookie and cracker account. It was here that he was introduced to the Keebler Elves. Drawing Ernie the Elf opened his eyes to the passion of cartooning. It was this passion, combined with a love of science, an interest in politics, and a flair for writing that eventually led to the creation of The Brilliant Mind of Edison Lee. Launched by King Features Syndicate on November 12, 2006, the comic strip has continued publication in newspapers worldwide.
