= List of child sportspeople =

Children who are or have been notable in sport.

- Fu Mingxia (伏明霞) is a diver became one of the youngest world champions ever in any sport at age 12, and was an Olympic gold medalist at the age of 13 years.
- Jet Li (Chinese name: Li Lianjie (李连杰)) is a Chinese martial artist, who has won several gold medals in wushu at the All China Games at the age of 12.
- Sachin Tendulkar – Batsman (cricket). Made his international debut at the age of 16 and subsequently represented India for 24 years. Played over 600 international matches, scoring 100 international centuries, and was the first batsman to reach 200 runs in a One Day International.
- Michelle Wie qualified for the USGA Women's Amateur Public Links (golf) at the age of 10 years and won the same event at the age of 13 years, making her the youngest person both to qualify for and win a USGA adult national championship.
- Wayne Gretzky was skating with 10-year-olds at the age of 6 years. By the age of 10 years, he scored 378 goals and 139 assists, in just 85 games, with the Nadrofsky Steelers.
- Tiger Woods was a child prodigy, introduced to golf before the age of 2, by his athletic father Earl. In 1984 at the age of 8, he won the 9–10 boys' event, the youngest age group available, at the Junior World Golf Championships. He first broke 80 at age 8. He went on to win the Junior World Championships six times, including four consecutive wins from 1988 to 1991.
- Nadia Comăneci won 3 gold medals at the 1976 Olympics and was the first female to achieve a perfect score of 10 in gymnastics at the age of 14.
- Ricky Rubio started his basketball career with DKV Joventut at the age of 14, becoming the youngest player to ever play in the Spanish ACB League, and played in the 2008 Summer Olympics at the age of 17 with eventual silver-medalists Spain, becoming the youngest ever to reach an Olympic basketball final.
- Guan Tianlang won the 2012 Asia-Pacific Amateur Championship in golf shortly after his 14th birthday. The following April, while still 14, he made the cut at the 2013 Masters Tournament, becoming the youngest male player ever to do so at a major championship.
- Yulia Lipnitskaya won the gold medal in the team figure skating event at the 2014 Winter Olympics at the age of 15. She also won the 2014 European Championships, becoming the youngest skater in ladies' singles in history to win that title.
- Lydia Ko, who went on to become a multiple major golf champion and world#1 player while still a teenager, first competed in the New Zealand national women's amateur championship for adults in March 2005, shortly before her eighth birthday. The tournament field also featured a 10-year-old, an 11-year-old, and three 13-year-olds. Four years later, shortly after turning 12, Ko lost in the final of the same event to a 14-year-old.
- Ashima Shiraishi climbed a boulder problem Crown of Aragorn, graded V13, at age of 10, becoming the youngest person (male or female) to climb this grade. At 14, she climbed Horizon, the first female to climb a boulder problem graded V15.
- Max Verstappen was a child racing prodigy who started racing karts at the age of 4. At the age of 9, he won the Belgian championship. Started Karting internationally at the age of 13 and in 2013 -at the age of 15- won the championship in Karting Highest category, Kz1. After moving through lower levels of formula racing, he ended up being picked up by Scuderia Toro Rosso in 2014 and started driving for the team in the 2015 season. His 2015 Australian GP start at the age of 17 years and 166 days saw him recognized with the record for the youngest driver to start F1, also managing to become the youngest F1 driver to score World Championship points at 17 years 180 days.
- Armand Duplantis was a huge Pole vault prodigy since early age, starting at age 4 in his backyard, and still holding all (unofficial) world records for pole vault at age seven, eight, nine, ten, eleven and twelve years.
- Alina Zagitova won the gold medal in the ladies figure skating singles at the 2018 Winter Olympics at the age of 15. She is also the youngest female skater to achieve the Super Slam, after Yuna Kim.
- Alexandra Trusova landed the first quad toeloop, quad flip and quad lutz in women's figure skating. She landed her first quad internationally at age 13. By the age of 7, she had all her triples, and at 12, she jumped quads.
- Sky Brown is a British-Japanese skateboarder and surfer. At age 13, she won the bronze at the 2020 Summer Olympics
- Vaibhav Suryavanshi is a 15-year-old teenage batting prodigy from Bihar who plays for the Rajasthan Royals in the IPL. He is the youngest cricketer to score a century in men's T20 cricket achieveing the feat at just 14 year of age. He broke Chris Gayle's record for the most sixes hit in a single IPL season, blasting well over 60 sixes in his campaign.
