= The Brilliant Mind of Edison Lee =

American comic strip by John Hambrock

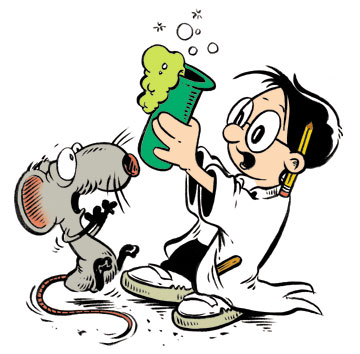
- Edison Lee and his assistant Joules
- Author: John Hambrock
- Website: The Brilliant Mind of Edison Lee
- Current status/schedule: Running
- Launch date: 2006-11-12
- Syndicate(s): King Features Syndicate

The Brilliant Mind of Edison Lee is a comic strip created by John Hambrock and distributed by King Features Syndicate. It debuted November 12, 2006. While this strip is about a ten-year-old boy genius, Edison Lee, it also has aspects of an editorial cartoon since Edison discusses the U.S. political and economic situation. In March 2010, the strip was nominated for the National Cartoonists Society's division award in the category Newspaper Comic Strip, along with Zits and Non Sequitur.

== Characters and story ==
The strip stars Edison Lee, his family and his friend and assistant, a talking rat. Recurring characters include Edison's cousin and classmates, and a U.S. Senator in political strips. Other secondary characters occur at such places as the fast-food restaurant, the supermarket, and the hospital.

=== Edison Lee ===
Edison Lee is an extremely smart ten-year-old who is obsessed with US politics. He creates inventions which directly relate to the current state of affairs in the US.

=== Don Lee ===
Don is Edison’s father. While flummoxed at times about Edison's musings, he does react firmly when Edison makes unlikely demands.

=== Carol Lee ===
Carol is Edison's mother. She is an educator and is the stable member of the family.

=== Orville Lee ===
Orville, Edison’s paternal grandfather, is retired. He loves to eat junk food and watch TV. Any mention of healthy food and good health in general falls on deaf ears.

=== Joules ===
Joules is Edison’s lab assistant, a talking rat. He only appears when Edison is conjuring up a new invention, board game or scheme in his laboratory.

Edison Lee [bottom left first panel] with his parents and grandfather

=== Harley Webster ===
Haarley is Edison’s younger cousin. While less intellectually curious that Edison, he is, in some ways, more street-smart and able to see the flaws in Edison’s schemes, to Edison’s great frustration. Raised in a single-parent household, Harley enjoys spending time with Edison but has learned from past experiences to be cautions when agreeing to participate in his cousin’s outlandish experiments.

=== Katie Franklin ===
Katie is Edison’s classmate and friend. Her even-keeled approach to life stands in stark contrast to Edison’s free-spirited sensibilities. The two of them are highly competitive, yet they respect each other’s intelligence and unique abilities.

=== Myron Bohr ===
Myron is one of Edison’s best friends. He is extremely shy, yet he has a sharp sense of humor that emerges when its least expected. He is a gifted young man who is full of surprises.

=== Senator Otto Ottoman ===
Senator Ottoman and Edison can often be found sitting together in the local diner sparring over current issues, with the Senator offering up his usual ambiguous answers to Edison’s unrelenting questioning.

== Style ==
The daily strip usually runs to four panels, with three panels appearing on some occasions. The Sunday strip is in a two-tiered format with a large throwaway logo panel appearing on the left. It is drawn in great detail and appears in color (online and in newspapers that carry daily color strips). Objects like computers, cars and other props required in a cartoon strip are presented as close to reality as possible. While much of the characters' lives takes place inside their house, they are frequently shown outside, gazing at the heavens or traveling into the woods. They are also shown shopping at a mall, buying medicines at a pharmacy and visiting the doctor.

There is very little serialization as in strips like Retail or Sherman's Lagoon where the story usually runs for a week or more. In The Brilliant Mind of Edison Lee the story generally runs on a day-to-day basis with some exceptions.
