= Child prodigy =

Exceptionally precocious child

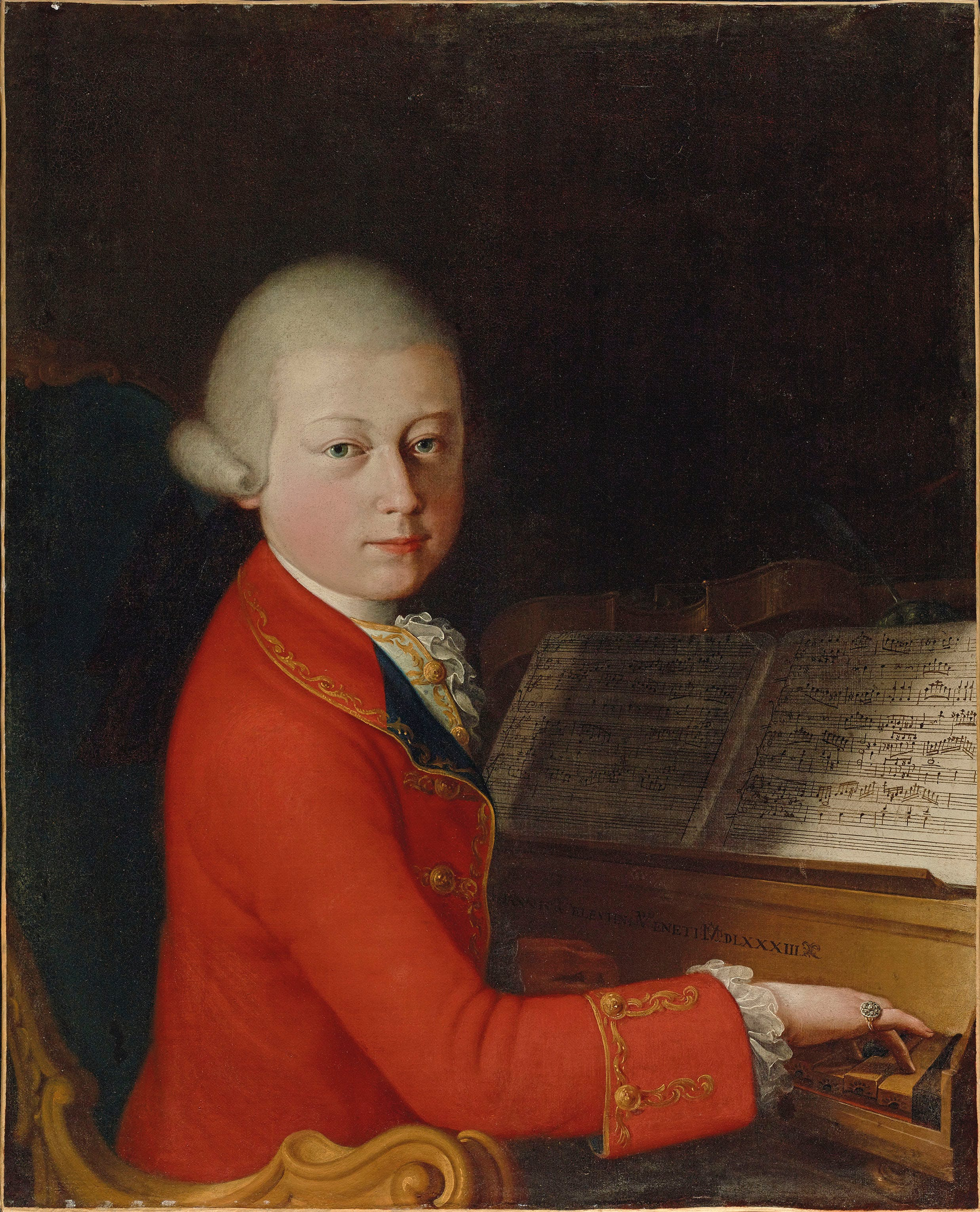
Wolfgang Amadeus Mozart, a well-known child prodigy, started composing at the age of five.

A child prodigy is, technically, a child under the age of 10 who produces meaningful work in some domain at the level of an adult expert. The term is also applied more broadly to describe young people who are extraordinarily talented in some field.

The term wunderkind (from German Wunderkind 'wonder child') is sometimes used as a synonym for child prodigy, particularly in media accounts. Wunderkind also is used to recognise those who achieve success and acclaim early in their adult careers.

Generally, prodigies in all domains are suggested to have relatively elevated IQ, extraordinary memory, and exceptional attention to detail. Significantly, while math and physics prodigies may have higher IQs, this may be an impediment to art prodigies.

Top performing youths rarely transition into becoming top performing adults. An examination of the backgrounds of top performing adults indicates that they tend to do early training in multiple disciplines, whereas top performing youths tend to train exclusively in one discipline.

== Examples ==
=== Chess prodigies ===
==== Deliberate practice ====
K. Anders Ericsson emphasised the contribution of deliberate practice over their innate talent to prodigies' exceptional performance in chess. The deliberate practice is energy-consuming and requires attention to correct mistakes. As prodigies start formal chess training early with intense dedication to deliberate practice, they may accumulate enough deliberate practice for their exceptional performance. Therefore, this framework provide an arguably reasonable justification for chess prodigies. However, similar amounts of practice also make children differ in their achievements because of other factors such as the quality of deliberate practice, and their interests in chess.

==== Intelligence and chess performance ====
Chess prodigies may have higher IQs than normal children. This positive link between chess skills of prodigies and intelligence is particularly significant on the "performance intelligence", regarding fluid reasoning, spatial processing, attentiveness to details, and visual-motor integration, while least significant on the "verbal intelligence", regarding the ability to understand and reason using concepts framed in words. However, this positive link is absent among adult experts. Remarkably, in the sample of chess prodigies, the more intelligent children played chess worse. This is considered as the result of less practice time of more intelligent chess skills.

==== Practice-plasticity-processes model ====
Practice-plasticity-processes (PPP) model was proposed to explain the existence of chess prodigies by integrating the practice extreme and innate talent extreme theories. Besides deliberate practice, neuroplasticity is identified as another critical component for developing chess heuristics (e.g., simple search techniques and abstract rules like "occupy the centre"), chunks (e.g., group of pieces locating in specific squares), and templates (e.g., familiarised complex patterns of chunks), which are essential for chess skills. The more plastic the brain is, the easier it is for them to acquire chunks, templates, and heuristics for better performance. On the other hand, inherited individual differences in the brain are circumscribed children to learn these skills.

=== Music prodigies ===
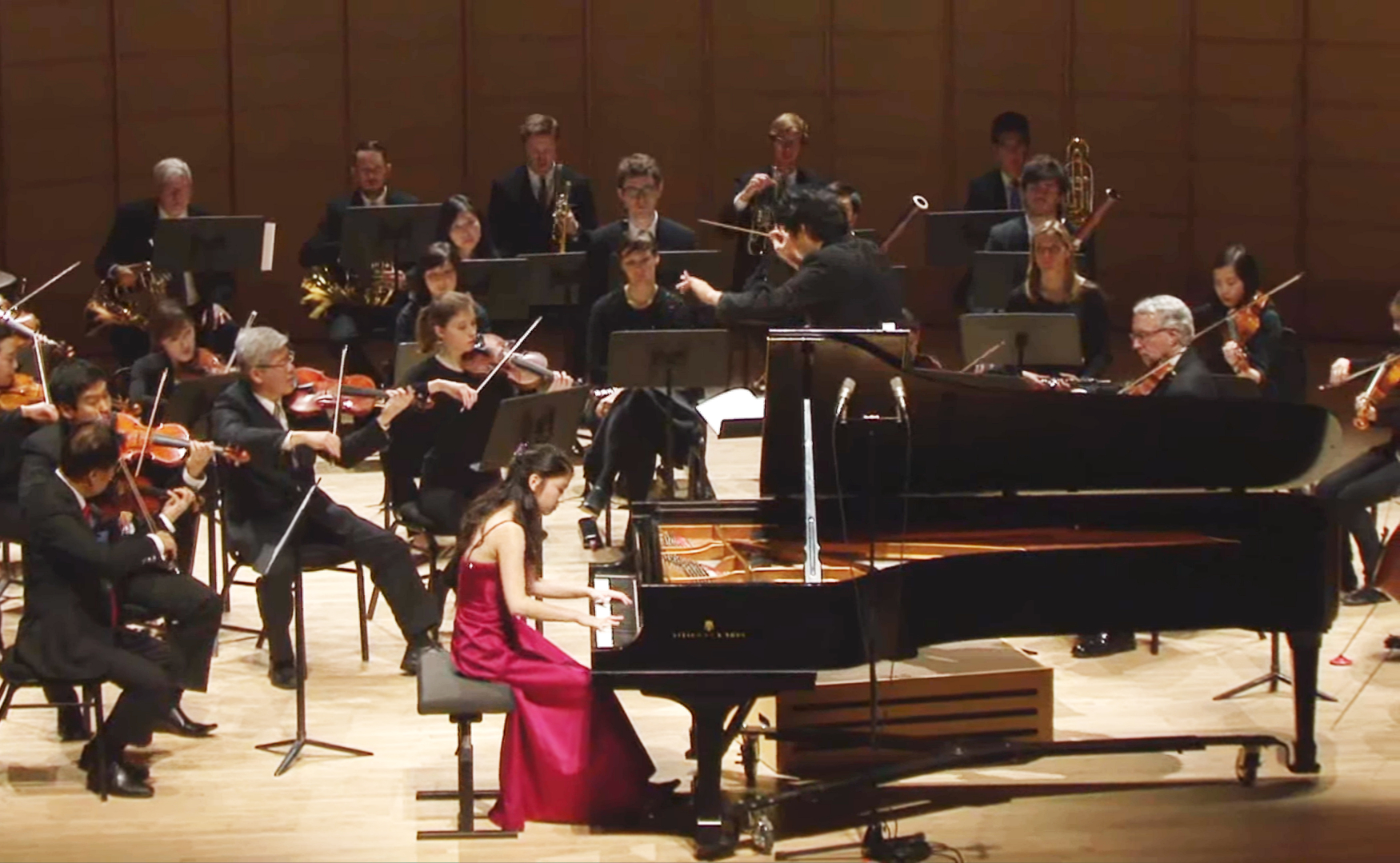
A 16-year-old Canadian music prodigy performs as a soloist with the Vancouver Metropolitan Orchestra.

Music prodigies usually express their talents in exceptional performance or composition.

The Multifactorial Gene-Environment Interaction Model incorporates the roles of adequate practice, certain personality traits, elevated IQ, and exceptional working memory in the explanation of music prodigies. A study comparing current and former prodigies with normal people and musicians who showed their talents or were trained later in life to test this model. It found prodigies neither have exceptional performance in terms of IQ, working memory, nor specific personality. This study also emphasises the significance of frequent practice early in life, when the brain is more plastic. Besides the quality of practice, and the parental investment, the experience of flow during the practice is important for efficient and adequate practice for music prodigies. Practice demands high levels of concentration, which is hard for children in general, but flow can provide inherent pleasures of the practice to ensure this focused work.

== Memory capacity of prodigies ==
PET scans performed on several mathematics prodigies have suggested that they think in terms of long-term working memory (LTWM). This memory, specific to a field of expertise, is capable of holding relevant information for extended periods, usually hours. For example, experienced waiters have been found to hold the orders of up to twenty customers in their heads while they serve them, but perform only as well as an average person in number-sequence recognition. The PET scans also answer questions about which specific areas of the brain associate themselves with manipulating numbers.

One subject never excelled as a child in mathematics, but he taught himself algorithms and tricks for calculatory speed, becoming capable of extremely complex mental math. His brain, compared to six other controls, was studied using the PET scan, revealing separate areas of his brain that he manipulated to solve complex problems. Some of the areas that he and presumably prodigies use are brain sectors dealing in visual and spatial memory, as well as visual mental imagery. Other areas of the brain showed use by the subject, including a sector of the brain generally related to childlike "finger counting", probably used in his mind to relate numbers to the visual cortex.

This finding is consistent with the introspective report of this calculating prodigy, which states that he used visual images to encode and retrieve numerical information in LTWM. Compared to short-term memory strategies, used by normal people on complex mathematical problems, encoding and retrieval episodic memory strategies would be more efficient. The prodigy may switch between these two strategies, which reduce the storage retrieval times of long-term memory and circumvent the limited capacities of short-term memory. In turn, they can encode and retrieve specific information (e.g., the intermediate answers during the calculation) in the long-term working memory more accurately and effectively.

Similar strategies were found among prodigies mastering mental abacus calculation. The positions of beads on the physical abacus act as visual proxies of each digit for prodigies to solve complex computations. This one-to-one corresponding structure allows them to rapidly encode and retrieve digits in the long-term working memory during the calculation. The fMRI scans showed stronger activation of brain areas related to visual processing for Chinese children being trained with abacus mental compared to control groups. This may indicate a greater demand for visuospatial information processing and visual-motor imagination in abacus mental calculation. Additionally, the right middle frontal gyrus activation is suggested to be the neuroanatomical link between prodigies' abacus mental calculation and the visuospatial working memory. This activation serves a mediation effect on the correlation between abacus-based mental calculation and visuospatial working memory. A training-induced neuroplasticity regarding working memory performance for children is proposed. A study examining German calculating prodigies also proposed a similar reason for exceptional calculation abilities. Excellent working memory capacities and neuroplastic changes brought by extensive practice would be essential to enhance this domain-specific skill.

== Working memory/cerebellum theory ==
"My mother said that I should finish high school and go to college first."

— Saul Kripke in response to an invitation to apply for a teaching position at Harvard

Noting that the cerebellum acts to streamline the speed and efficiency of all thought processes, Vandervert explained the abilities of prodigies in terms of the collaboration of working memory and the cognitive functions of the cerebellum. Citing extensive imaging evidence, Vandervert first proposed this approach in two publications which appeared in 2003. In addition to imaging evidence, Vandervert's approach is supported by the substantial award-winning studies of the cerebellum by Masao Ito.

Vandervert provided extensive argument that, in the prodigy, the transition from visual-spatial working memory to other forms of thought (language, art, mathematics) is accelerated by the unique emotional disposition of the prodigy and the cognitive functions of the cerebellum. According to Vandervert, in the emotion-driven prodigy (commonly observed as a "rage to master") the cerebellum accelerates the streamlining of the efficiencies of working memory in its manipulation and decomposition/re-composition of visual-spatial content into language acquisition and into linguistic, mathematical, and artistic precocity.

Essentially, Vandervert has argued that when a child is confronted with a challenging new situation, visual-spatial working memory and speech-related and other notational system-related working memory are decomposed and re-composed (fractionated) by the cerebellum and then blended in the cerebral cortex in an attempt to deal with the new situation. In child prodigies, Vandervert believes this blending process is accelerated due to their unique emotional sensitivities which result in high levels of repetitious focus on, in most cases, particular rule-governed knowledge domains. He has also argued that child prodigies first began to appear about 10,000 years ago when rule-governed knowledge had accumulated to a significant point, perhaps at the agricultural-religious settlements of Göbekli Tepe or Cyprus.

== Development ==
=== Nature versus nurture ===
Some researchers believe that prodigious talents tend to arise as a result of the innate talent of the child, and the energetic and emotional investment that the child ventures. Others believe that the environment plays the dominant role, many times in obvious ways. For example, László Polgár set out to raise his children to be chess players, and all three of his daughters went on to become world-class players (two of whom are grandmasters), emphasising the potency a child's environment can have in determining the pursuits toward which a child's energy will be directed, and showing that an incredible amount of skill can be developed through suitable training.

=== Co-incidence theory ===
Co-incidence theory explains the development of prodigies with a continuum of the discussion of nature and nurture. This theory states that the integration of various factors plays a role in the development and expression of human potential, including:

- Biological qualities (e.g., physical distinctions and limitations which entail talents, such as the absolute pitch of music prodigies)
- Individual psychological qualities (e.g., perseverance, patience, attention to detail)
- Intermediate context (e.g., family structure and its traditions)
- Cultural effect (e.g., an increasing number of chess prodigies may be due to the professionalization of chess, or the emergence of computers as a study tool)
- Historical and political context (e.g., girls in certain religious backgrounds may not receive training in music or any other art)
- Domain and the surrounding field (e.g., whether children with exceptional skills were born in an environment with flourishment in this field)

=== Late development ===
Prodigiousness in childhood is not always maintained into adulthood. Some researchers have found that gifted children fall behind due to lack of effort. Jim Taylor, professor at the University of San Francisco, theorizes that this is because gifted children experience success at an early age with little to no effort and may not develop a sense of ownership of success. Therefore, these children might not develop a connection between effort and outcome. Some children might also believe that they can succeed without effort in the future as well. Dr. Anders Ericcson, professor at Florida State University, researches expert performance in sports, music, mathematics, and other activities. His findings demonstrate that prodigiousness in childhood is not a strong indicator of later success. Rather, the number of hours devoted to the activity was a better indicator.

Rosemary Callard-Szulgit and other educators have written extensively about the problem of perfectionism in bright children, calling it their "number one social-emotional trait". Gifted children often associate even slight imperfection with failure, so that they become fearful of effort, even in their personal lives, and in extreme cases end up virtually immobilized.

A 2025 analysis in Science found that top performing youths rarely transition into becoming top performing adults across varied domains (e.g. sports, music, academia). The analysis indicated that top performing youths tended to engage in discipline-specific training early on, while top performing adults tended to engage in multi-discipline training early on.

== Link with autism ==
Prodigies have been found with the over-representation of relatives with autism on their family pedigrees. Autism traits on the autism-spectrum quotient (AQ) were reported in both first-degree relatives of child prodigies and of autism, which was higher than normal prevalence.

Some autistic traits can be found among prodigies. Firstly, the social function of arithmetic prodigies may be weaker because of larger activation in certain brain areas enhancing their arithmetic performance, which is also essential for social and emotional functions (i.e., precuneus, lingual and fusiform gyrus). These neuroplastic changes in neural networks may modulate their social performances in terms of emotional face processing and emotional evaluation of complex social interactions. Nevertheless, this emotional or social modulation must not score at psychopathological levels. Additionally, the attentiveness to details, a typical characteristic of AQ, is enhanced among prodigies compared to normal people, even those with Asperger syndrome.

== See also ==
- Chess prodigy
- Genius
- Gifted education
- Hothousing
- Intellectual giftedness
- Late bloomer
- List of child music prodigies
- List of child prodigies
- List of fictional child prodigies
- Malleability of intelligence
- Polymath
- Savant syndrome
- Mozart myths
